= Deal Pier =

Leisure pier in Kent, England

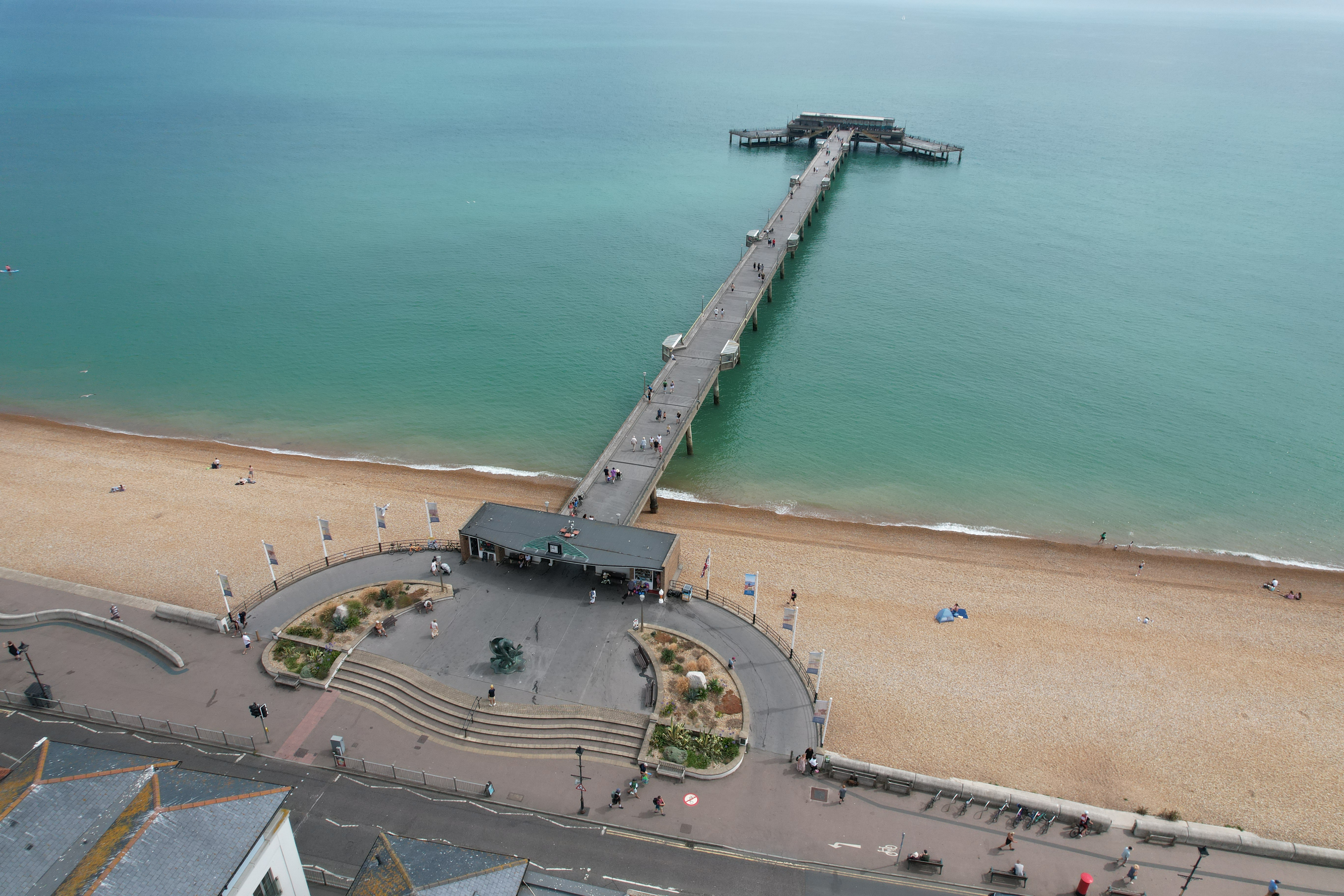
- The 1957 Deal Pier as of 2026
- Type: Pleasure
- Carries: Pedestrians
- Location: Deal, Kent
- Coordinates: 51°13′26″N 1°24′26″E
- Owner: Dover District Council

Characteristics
- Total length: 1,026 feet (313 m)

History
- Opening date: 19 November 1957; 68 years ago

Deal Pier is the last remaining fully intact leisure pier in Kent. It is the third pier to exist in Deal and was opened in November 1957 by the Duke of Edinburgh. Its structure was extensively refurbished and repaired in 1997, with work including the replacement of much of the concrete cladding on the pier's main piles. Work began in April 2008 to construct a new pier-head with a modern restaurant which opened the same year.

== History ==
=== Early piers ===
Deal Pier Act 1838
- Act of Parliament
- Parliament of the United Kingdom
- Long title: An Act for making and maintaining a Pier or Jetty and other Works at the Town and Borough of Deal in the Parish of Deal in the County of Kent.
- Citation: 1 & 2 Vict. c. xxviii

Dates
- Royal assent: 11 June 1838

Text of statute as originally enacted

The seafront at Deal has been adorned with three separate piers in the town's history. The first, authorised by the Deal Pier Act 1838 (1 & 2 Vict. c. xxviii), was designed by Sir John Rennie, although its wooden structure was destroyed during a storm in 1857. Originally intended to be 445 feet (136 m) in length, financial problems meant just 250 feet (76 m) was completed, which when opened, was just the sixth pier in the country.

In 1864, a second 1,100 feet (340 m) long pier designed by Eugenius Birch opened, with extensions in 1870 adding a reading room and a pavilion in 1886. It sustained impact damage several times during the 1870s and was acquired by Deal Council under the Deal Pier Order 1920. A popular pleasure pier, it survived until the Second World War, when it was struck and severely damaged by a mined Dutch ship, the Nora, in January 1940. Permission to demolish the pier was authorised by Winston Churchill, which left just the shore-side toll house, itself later demolished in 1954.

In December 1950, the Deal Corporation received a grant of £750 (equivalent to £29,800 in 2024) to compensate for damage sustained during the war.

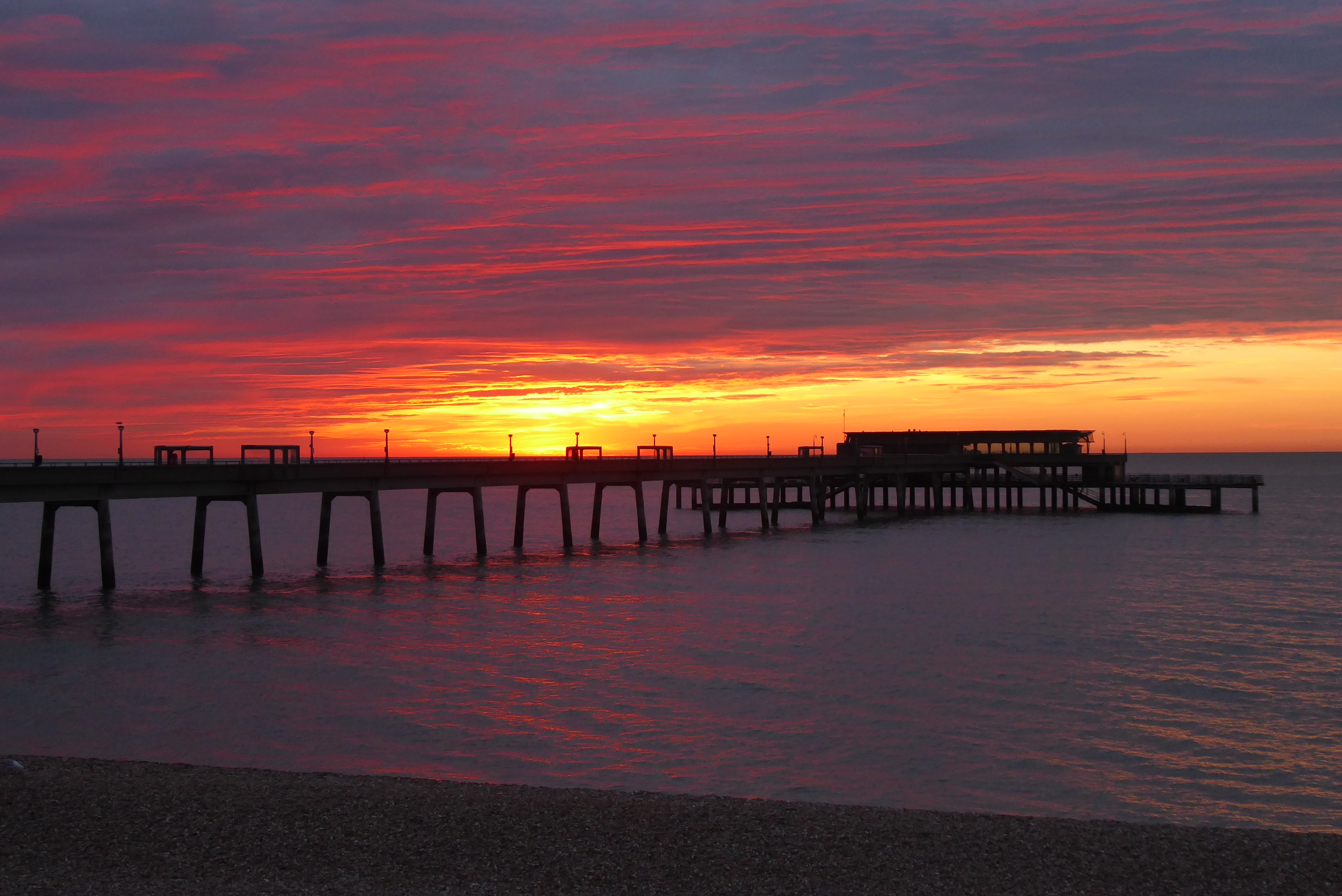
The pier from the south

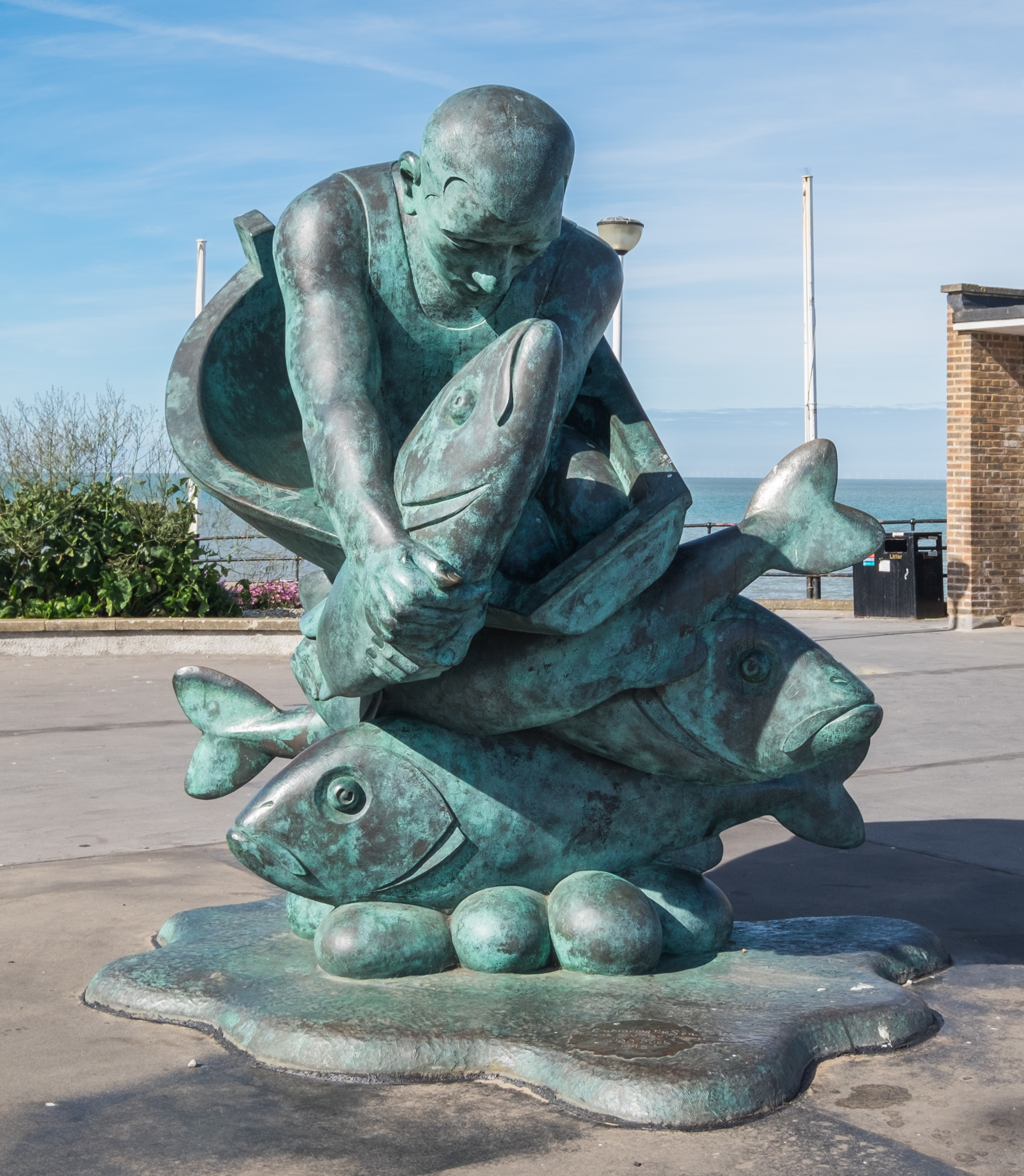
Embracing the Sea (1998) by Jon Buck at the entrance to the pier

=== Third pier ===
The present pier, designed by Sir W. Halcrow & Partners, was opened on 19 November 1957 by the Duke of Edinburgh. Constructed predominantly from concrete-clad steel, it is 1,026 feet (313 m) in length and ends in a three-tiered pier-head, featuring a cafe, bar, lounge, and fishing decks. The lowest of the three tiers is almost permanently underwater except for the lowest tide and has become disused. A notice announces that it is the same length as the RMS Titanic, but that ship was over 100 feet (30 m) shorter. The pier is a popular sport fishing venue.

In 2018, the pier underwent restoration at a cost of £500,000, in addition to installing more than 300 metres (980 ft) of gas mains supply, as the pier's own gas supply had developed problems. Refurbishment works included resurfacing, replacement and repainting of railings and an upgrade to the drainage system. The works coincided with the 60 year anniversary of the pier's official opening.

Awards and achievements
Preceded by Southend Pier	National Piers Society; Pier of the Year; 2008	Succeeded by Saltburn Pier
