= Cromer Pier =

Grade II listed Pier in Cromer, Norfolk, England

Coordinates: 52.934278°N 1.301622°E

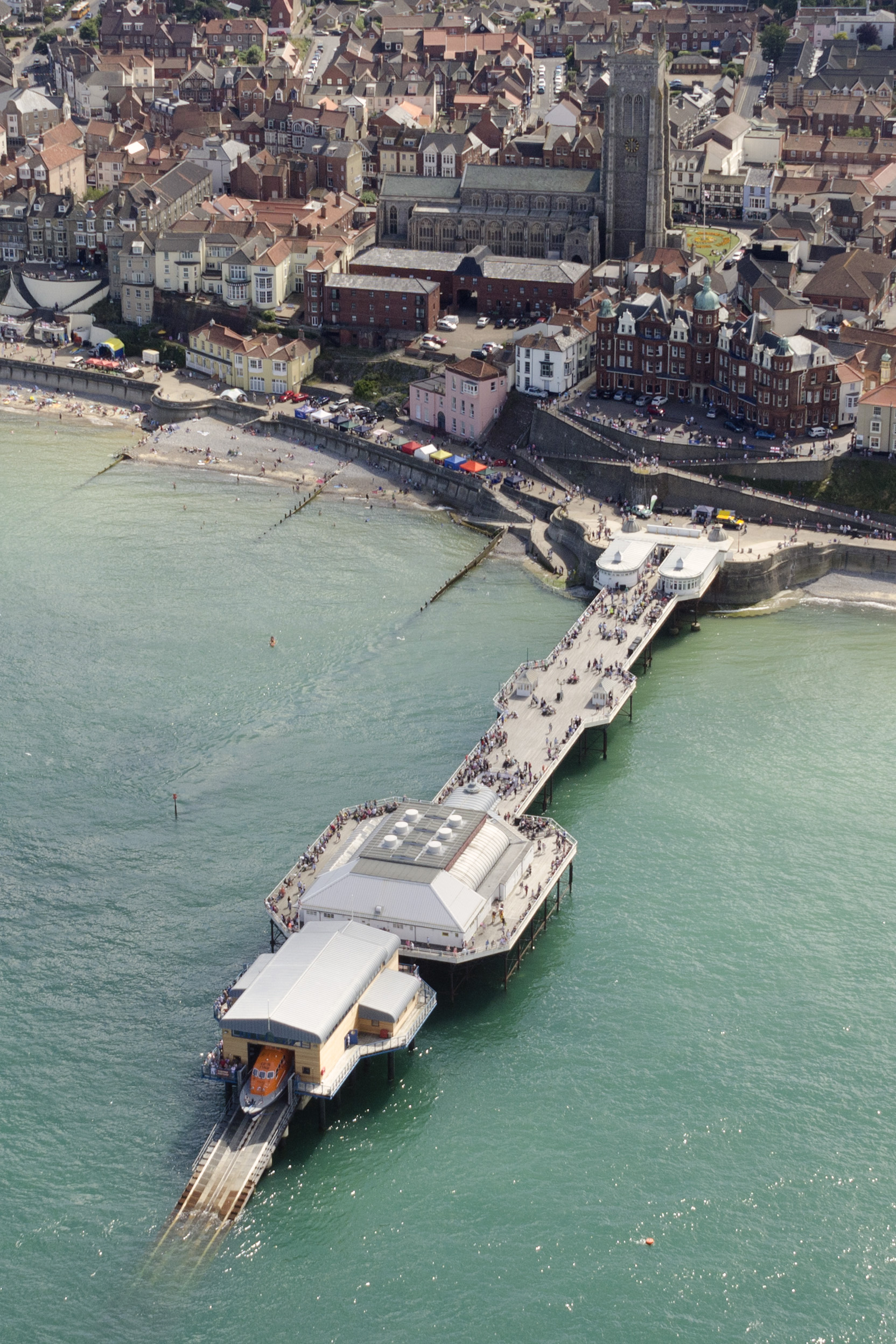
- Aerial view of Cromer pier in 2015
- Type: Pleasure Pier
- Official name: Cromer Pier
- Owner: North Norfolk District Council

Characteristics
- Total length: 495 feet (151 m)

History
- Constructor: Alfred Thorne
- Designer: Douglass and Arnott
- Opening date: 8 June 1901

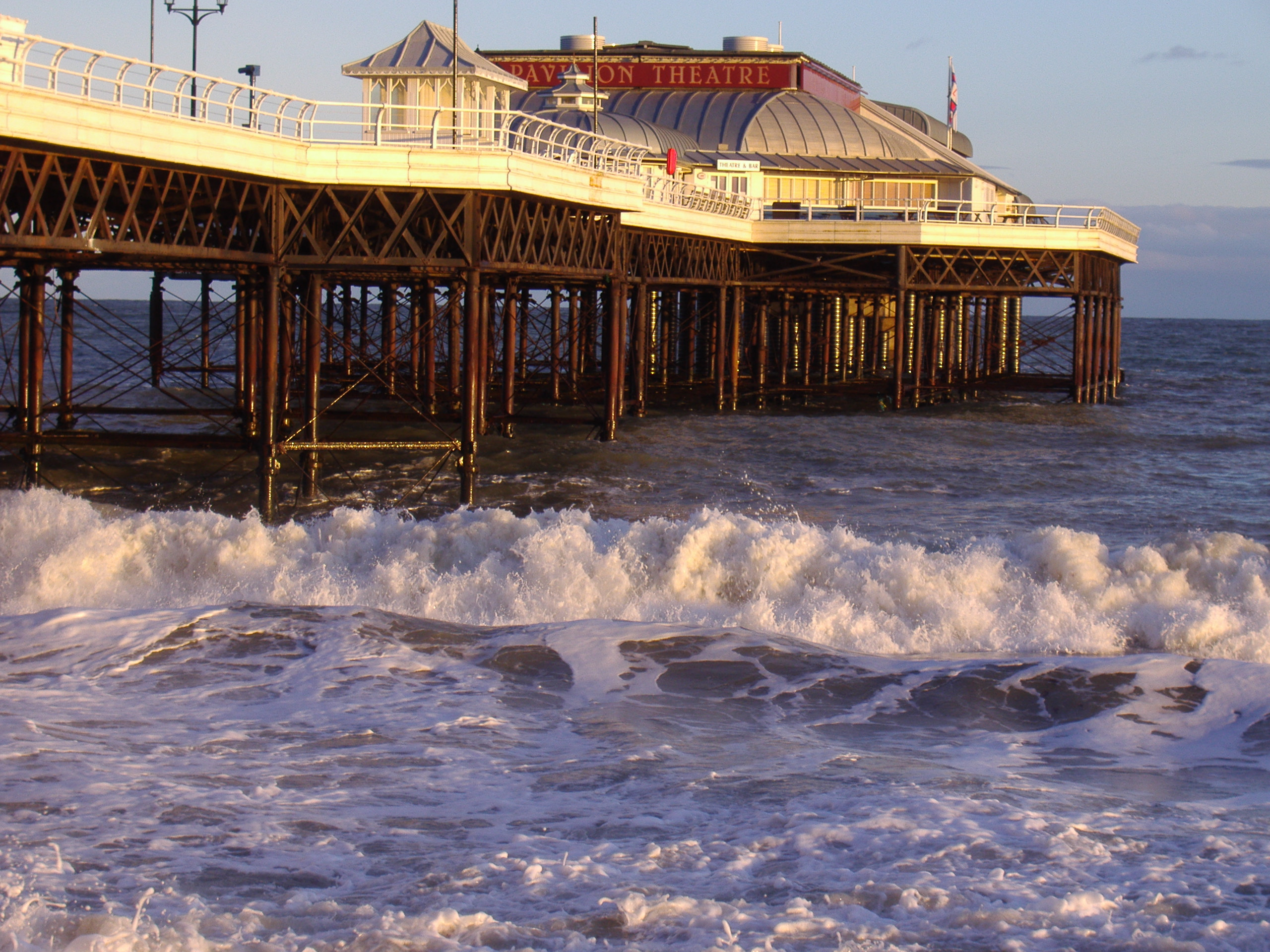
Pavilion Theatre on the end of Cromer Pier

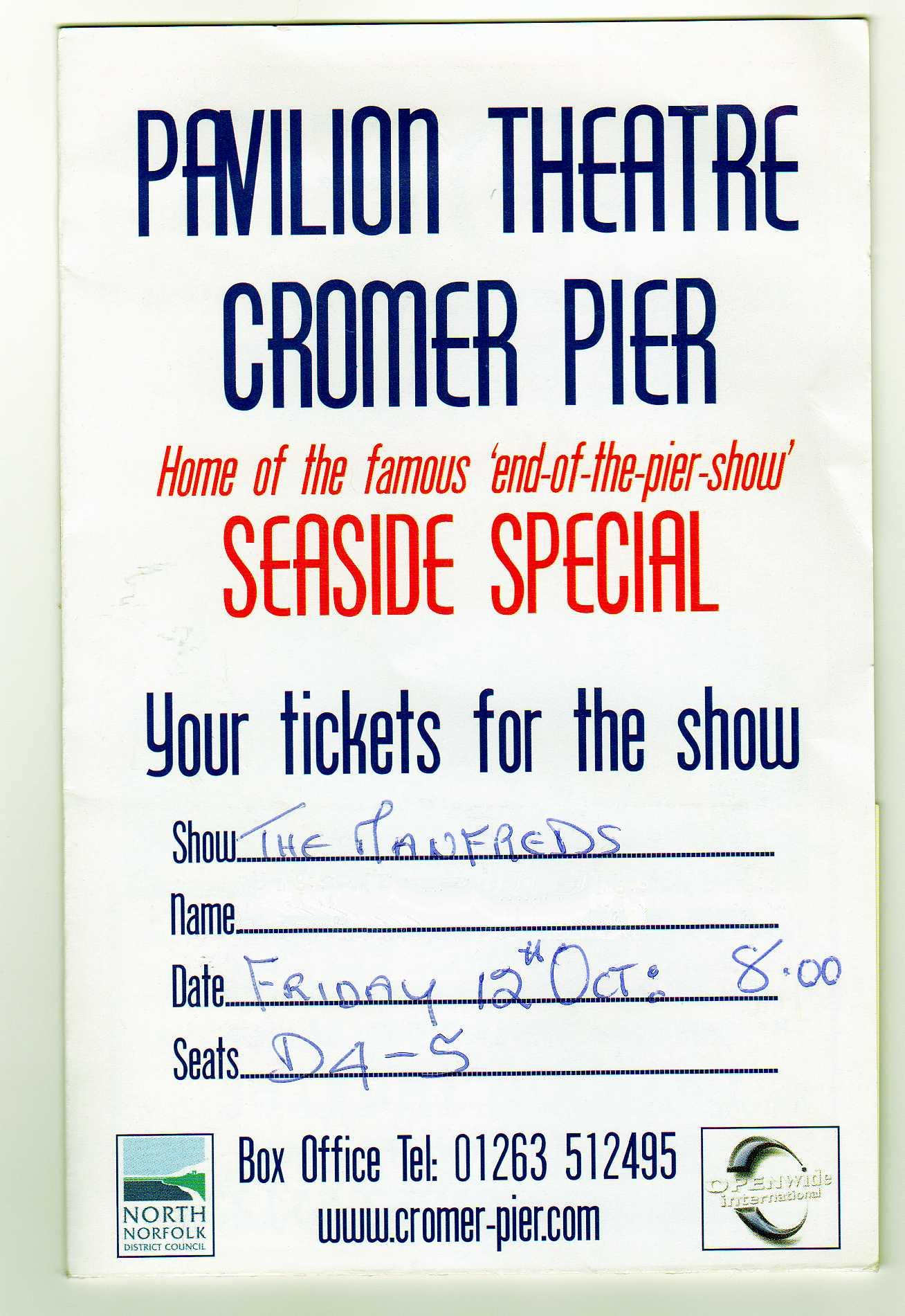
Ticket for the Pavilion Theatre on Cromer Pier, Show: The Manfreds

Cromer Pier is a Grade II listed seaside pier in the civil parish of Cromer on the north coast of the English county of Norfolk, 25 miles (40 km) due north of the city of Norwich in the United Kingdom. The pier is the home of the Cromer Lifeboat Station and the Pavilion Theatre.

== History ==
There are records of a pier in Cromer back as far as 1391, although then it was in the form of a jetty. In the year 1582, Queen Elizabeth I, in a letter to the inhabitants of Cromer granted rights to export wheat, barley and malt with the proceeds to be used for the maintenance and well-being of the pier and the town of Cromer.

In 1822, a 210-foot (64 m) long jetty was built (of cast iron, made by Hase of Saxthorpe) but this structure lasted just 24 years before it was totally destroyed in a storm. This jetty was replaced by another wooden structure but this time it was a little longer being 240 feet (73 m). This jetty soon became very popular for promenading. A keeper was employed to keep order; there were strict rules applied including no smoking, and ladies were required to retire from the jetty by 9 pm. The last wooden jetty survived until 1897, when it was damaged beyond repair after a coal boat smashed into it. It was dismantled and the timber sold for £40.

For a period of time from this date Cromer was without a pier but to end this situation the Cromer Protection Commissioners planned to replace the old wood structure with a more fashionable structure. This was authorised by the Cromer Protection Act 1899 (62 & 63 Vict. c. ccxl). In 1901, the new pier was completed and opened to the public. This new pier was designed by Douglass and Arnott and the construction was carried out by Alfred Thorne. The new pier was 450 feet (140 m) long and had cost £17,000 to build. In the early years the pier consisted of glass-screened shelters and a bandstand on the end of the pier. The shelters were roofed over in 1905 to form a pavilion; the bandstand was later replaced with a stage and proscenium arch. From 1907 this was used to accommodate the latest craze of roller-skating. The responsibilities of the Cromer Protection Commissioners were transferred to Cromer Urban District Council by the Cromer Urban District Council Act 1948 (11 & 12 Geo. 6. c. xix).

The pier is owned and maintained by North Norfolk District Council which undertook responsibility for running and funding after the local government re-organisation of 1974. Since that time, the district council have carried out a number of major repair and refurbishments, the most recent being completed in 2013.

In March 2015, the pier was voted Pier of the Year 2015 by the National Piers Society. Owners North Norfolk District Council said it was "a fantastic reward" and they were "hugely proud of the pier".

== Pier repairs ==
North Norfolk District Council began a £1.2 million repair scheme in June 2012, and the work was completed in October 2013, just before the tidal surge of December 2013. Repairs included replacement of the metal main trusses and cross braces.

The pier was damaged during the storm surge of 5 December 2013. However, the repair work just completed allowed the main structure to withstand the main force of the surge, although there was damage to parts of the walkway and other buildings. Decking boards were lifted with damage to the souvenir shop, the box office and the flooring of the Pavilion Theatre. The pier was closed to the public on safety grounds until repairs were completed, allowing the theatre to resume its Christmas show programme on 12 December 2013 and allowing public access to the pier, and the RNLI safe access to the lifeboat station at the pier-end.

An initial assessment of the damage to the pier made indicated repair costs would be in the tens of thousands of pounds, but within nine days this figure had escalated to the hundreds of thousands. A temporary box office was erected at the pier-entrance while the permanent box office and souvenir shop were refurbished. As of July 2014, work was continuing, and the pier's supporting structure had been repaired. Another eight-week scheme of improvements was expected to start in September 2014, with a projected cost of a further £200,000.

== In the media ==
- Our Miss Fred used the exterior of the pier's theatre in a 1972 film with Danny La Rue
- The pier was used as a film location for the 1979 ITV television series, Danger UXB, starring Anthony Andrews, and in the 1993 ITV series September Song with Russ Abbot.
- The Flesh and Blood Show used the pier's theatre in a 1972 horror thriller film with Jenny Hanley and Ray Brooks.
- The pier can be seen in the background of several shots in the final episode of the 1993 David Croft and Jimmy Perry sitcom You Rang, M'Lord, during the final scenes in which characters are performing music hall theatre on Cromer beach.
- The Living TV show Most Haunted visited the pier for investigation of any paranormal activity in April 2009.
- The 2011 film In Love with Alma Cogan was filmed on and around the pier.
- The pier and the town was used as a location for the 2013 film Alan Partridge: Alpha Papa,
- The BBC short fantasy ident, Wonderland, one of the 'Oneness' idents, first aired 1 December 2018.

== Awards ==
- 2000 National Piers Society – Pier of the Year
- 2015 National Piers Society – Pier of the Year
- 2024 National Piers Society – Pier of the Year

== Gallery ==
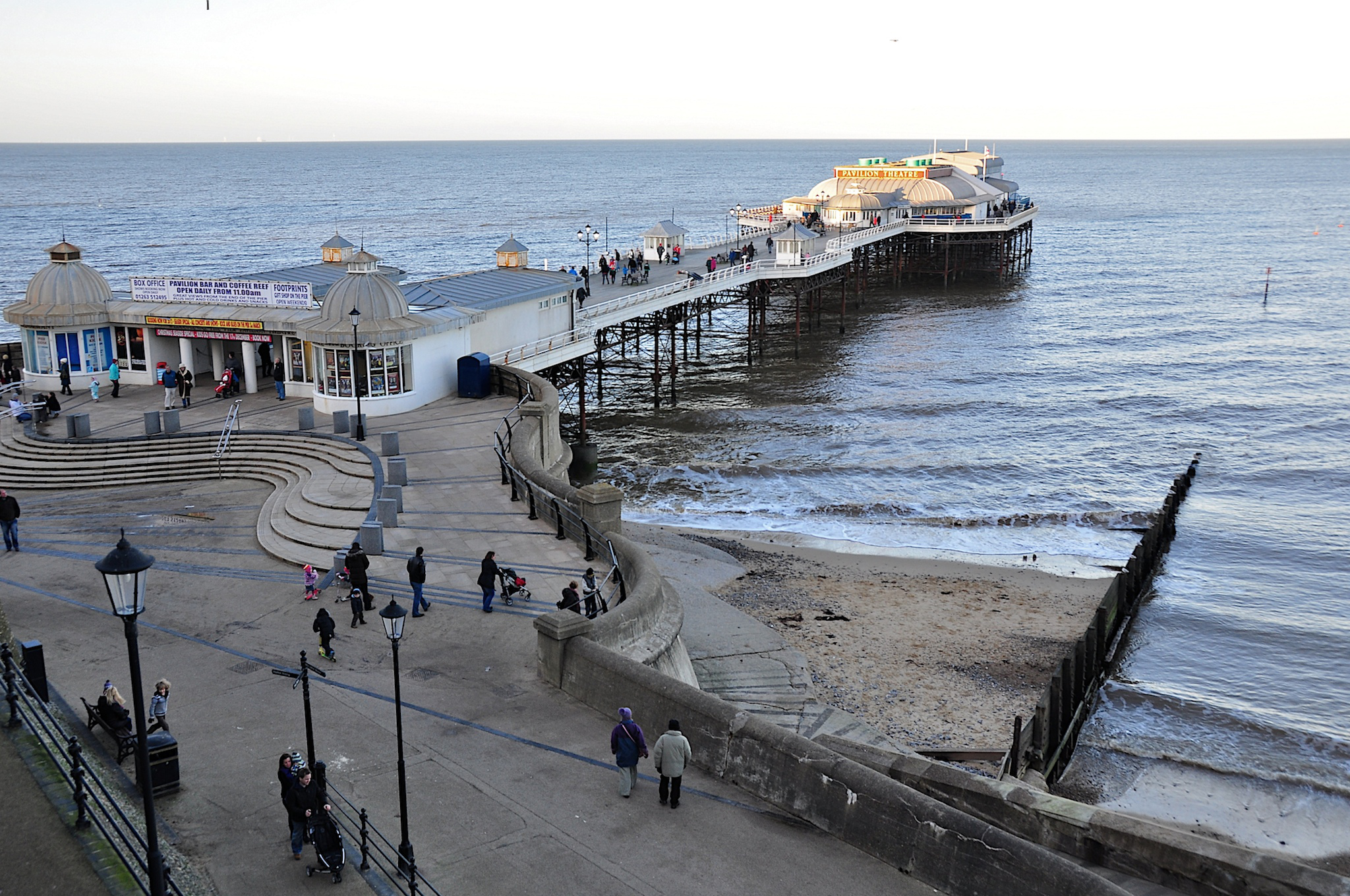
Cromer Pier, January 2012

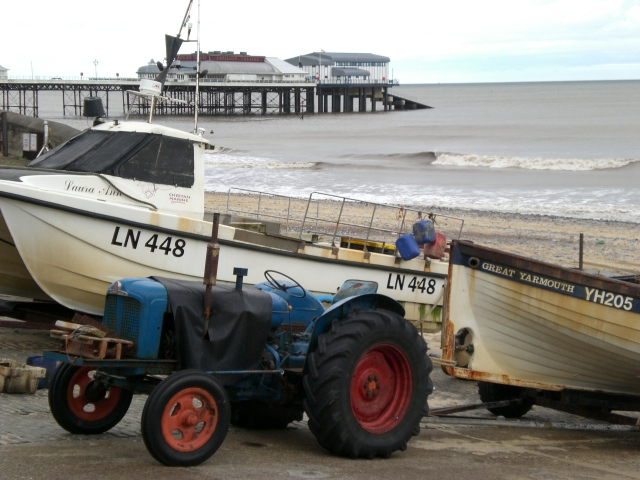
Cromer Pier as seen from the Henry Blogg Museum

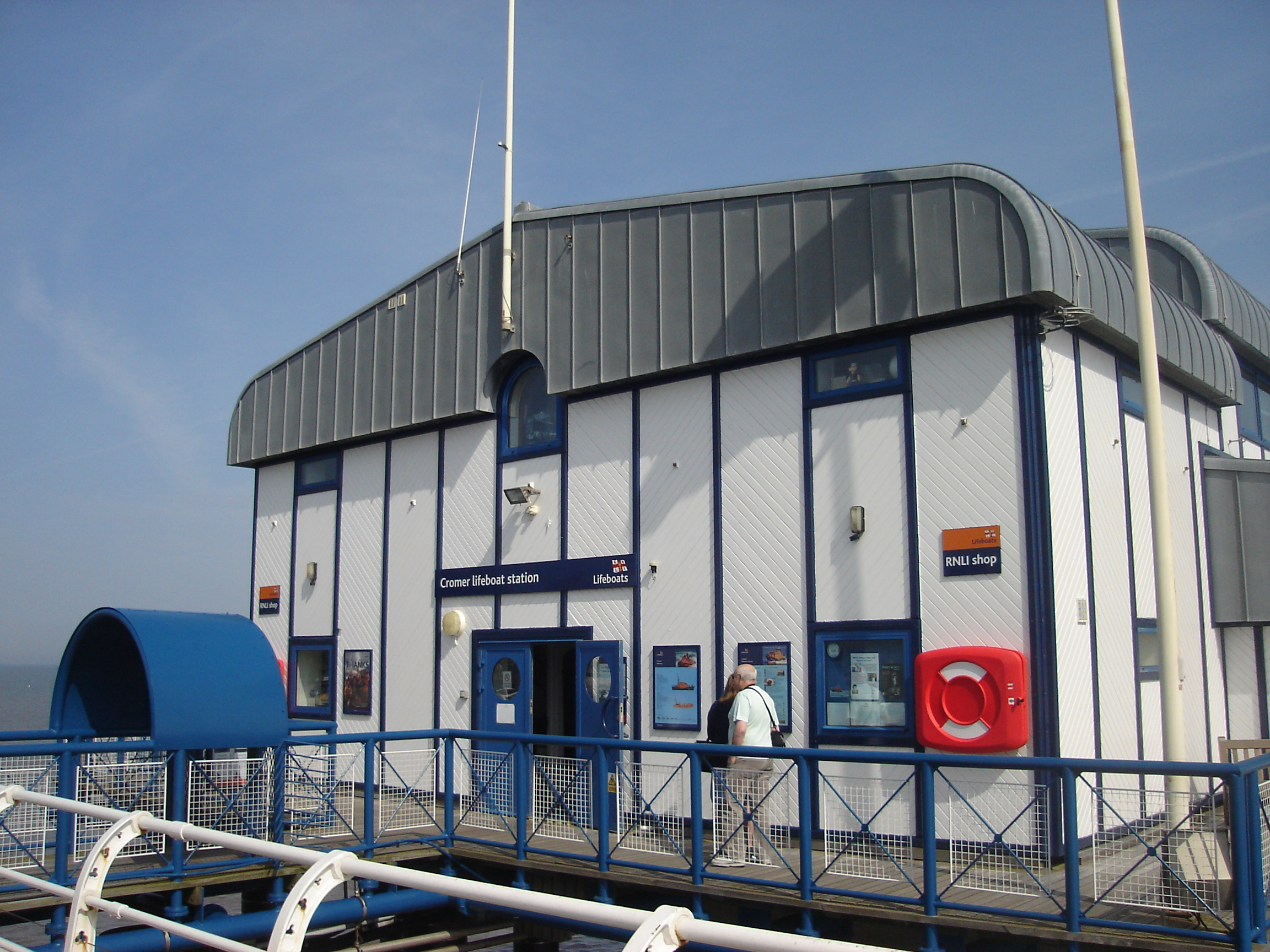
Cromer Lifeboat Station

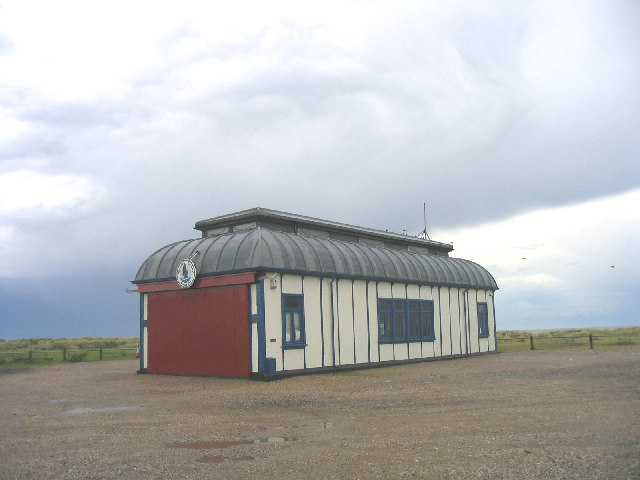
Old Cromer Lifeboat shed now at Southwold

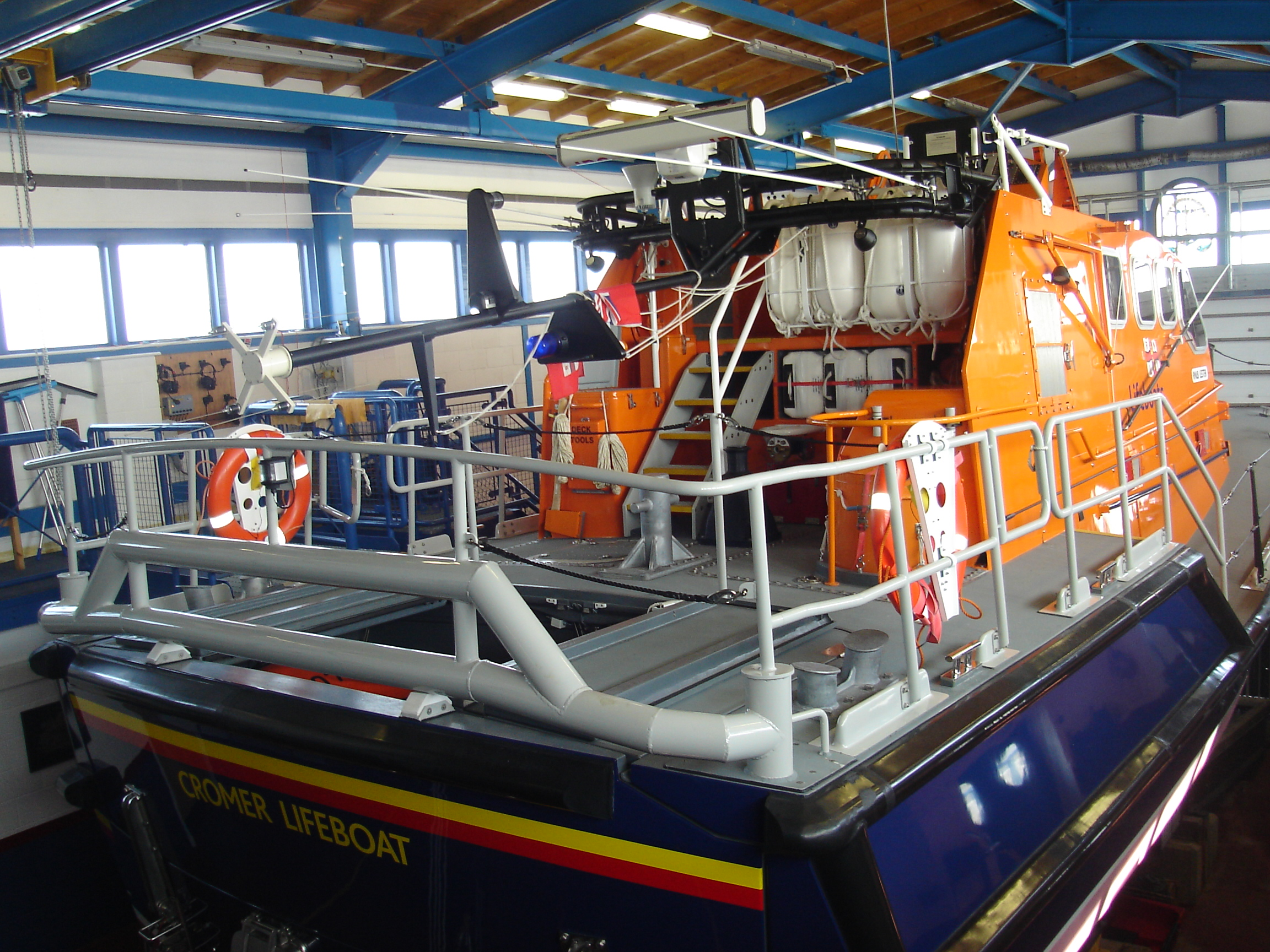
RNLB Lester

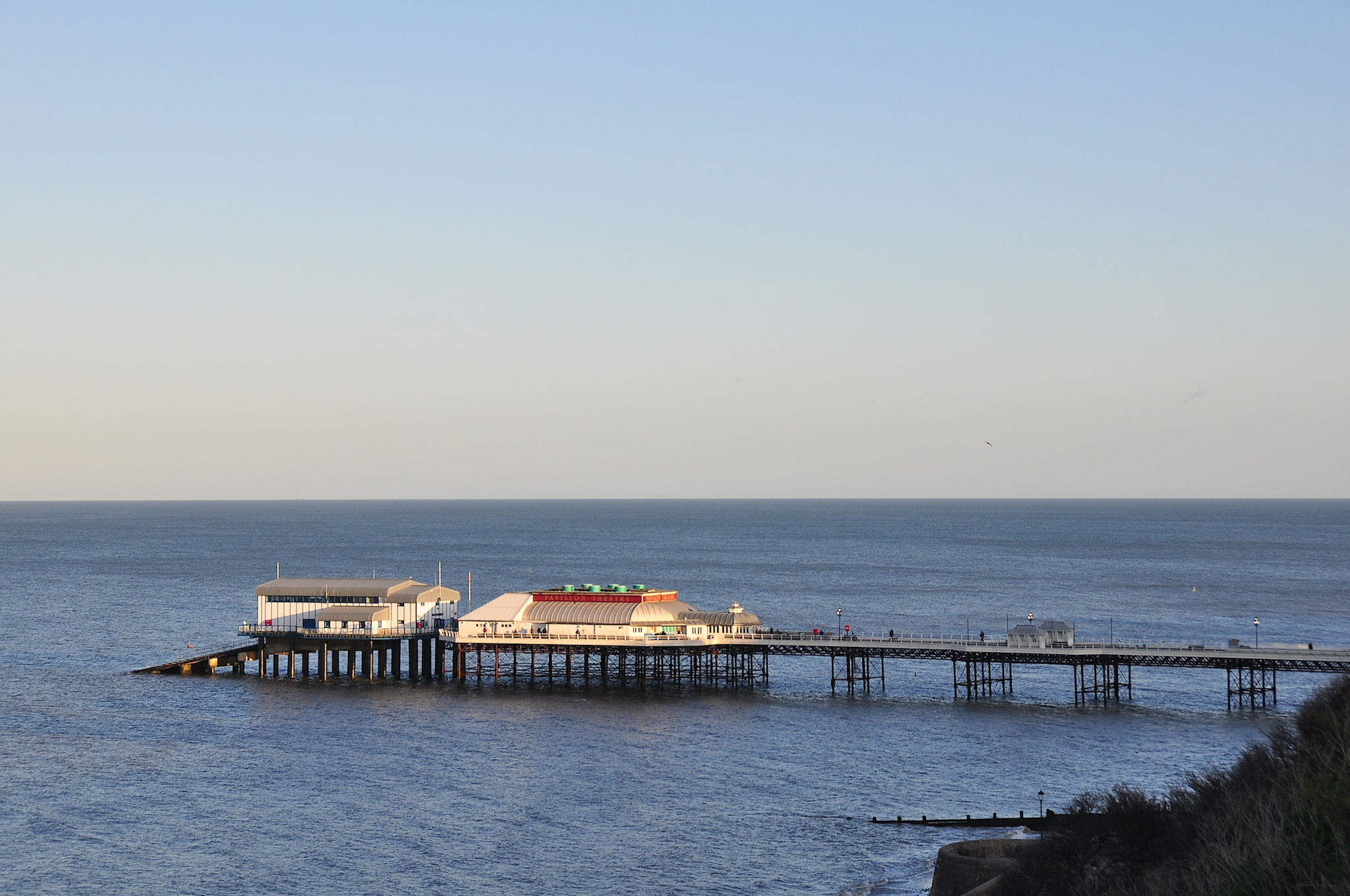
View of the pier

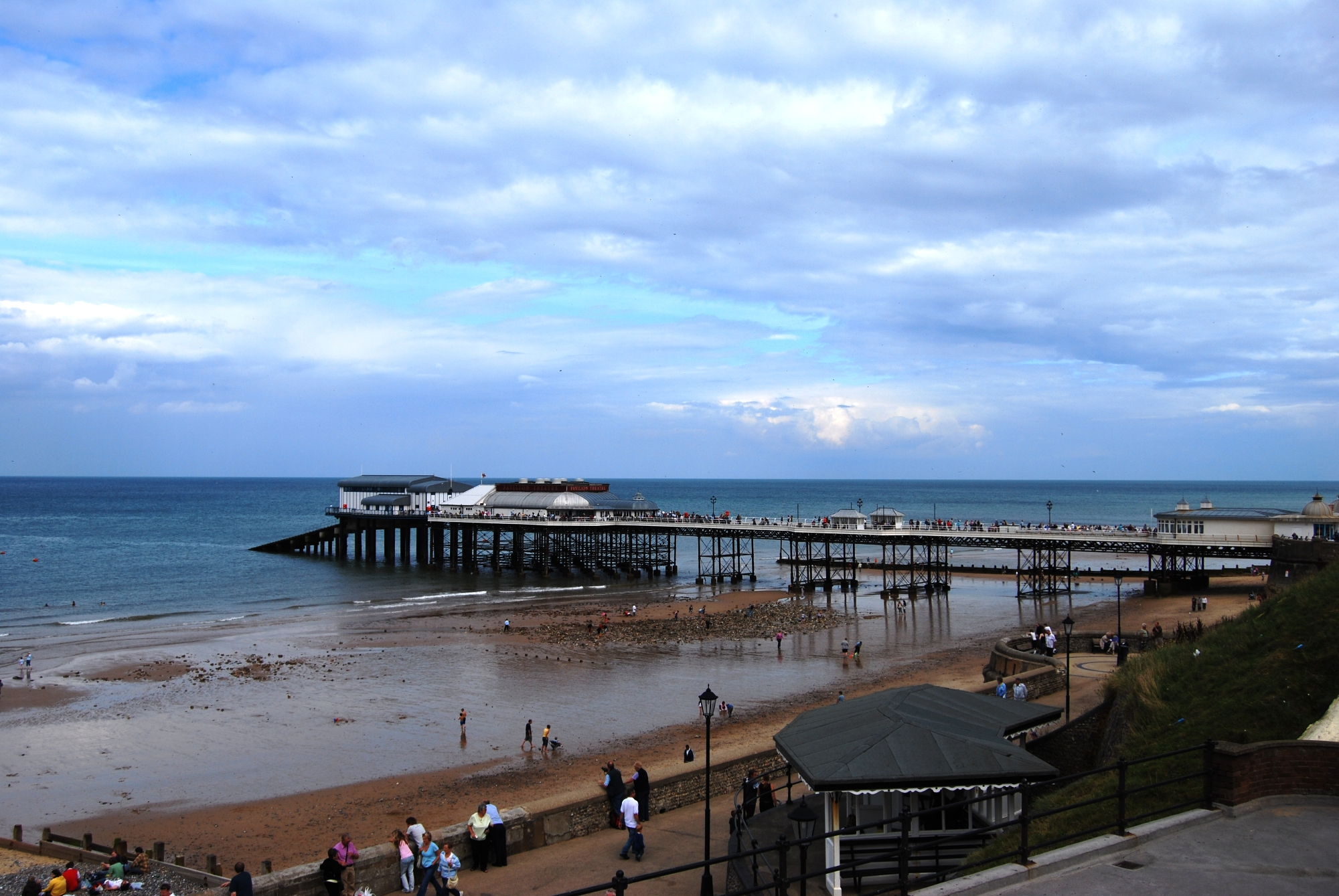
Pier viewed from the west

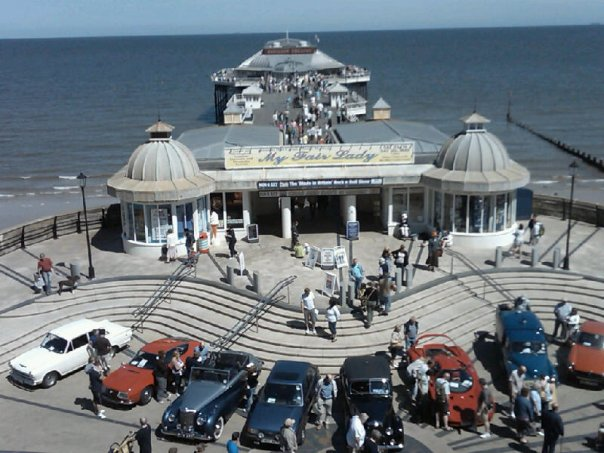
Cromer Pier, May 2009

== See also ==
- List of piers in the United Kingdom

Awards and achievements
Preceded by Penarth Pier	National Piers Society; Pier of the Year; 2015	Succeeded by Cleethorpes Pier
Preceded by Clevedon Pier	National Piers Society; Pier of the Year; 2000	Succeeded by Grand Pier, Weston-super-Mare
Preceded by Southend Pier	National Piers Society; Pier of the Year; 2024	Succeeded by Llandudno Pier
