= Southend Pier =

Pleasure pier in Southend-on-Sea

Coordinates: 51°31′27″N 0°43′07″E

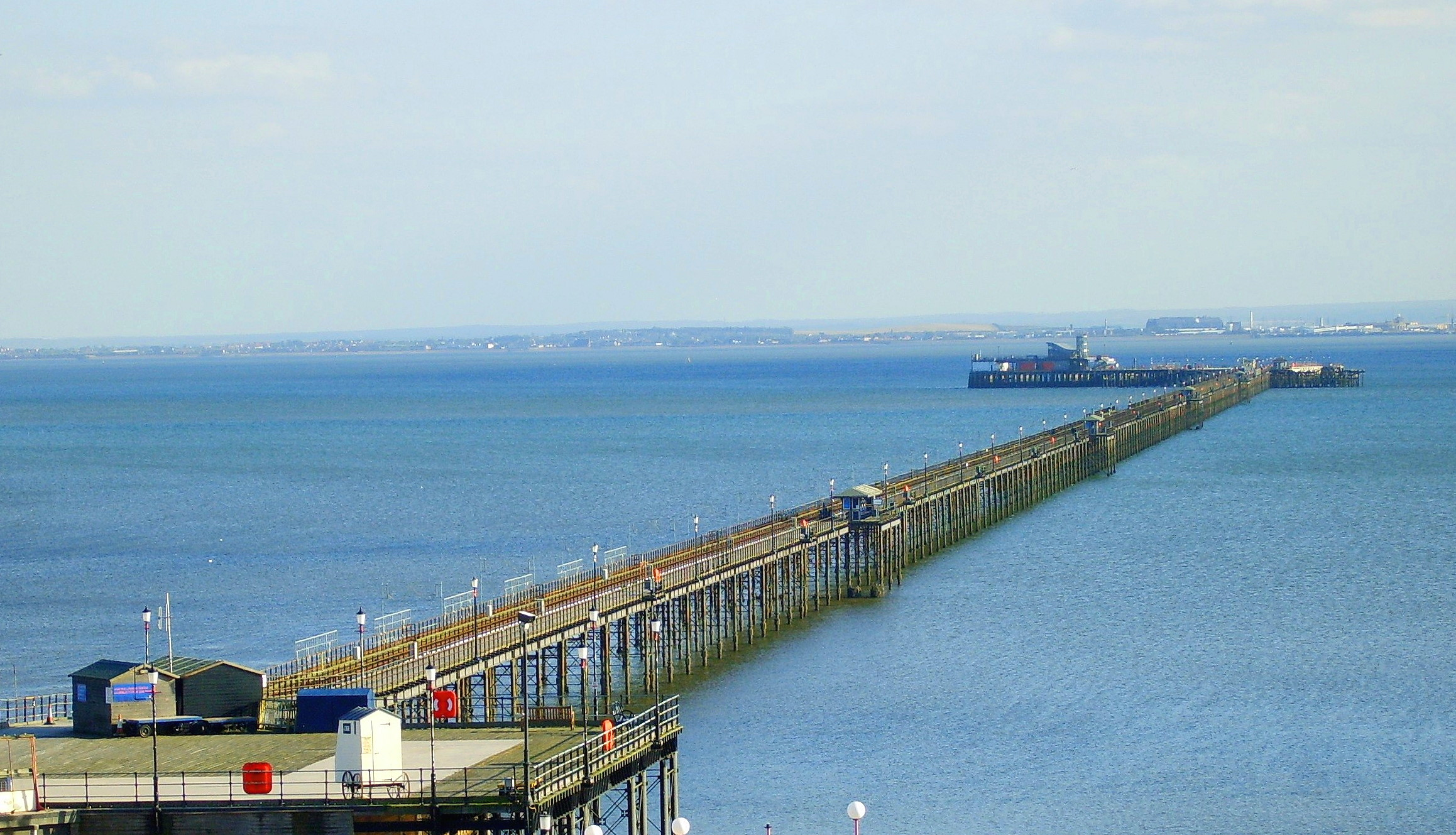
- Southend Pier in 2007
- Type: Pleasure, RNLI lifeboat station
- Carries: Pedestrians, shuttle train, lifeboat crews/supplies
- Spans: Thames Estuary
- Location: Essex, UK
- Coordinates: TQ884849 (shoreside); TQ897830 (pierhead)
- Owner: Southend-on-Sea City Council
- Maintained by: Southend-on-Sea City Council

Characteristics
- Construction: Hardwood decking on iron piles
- Total length: 2,158 metres (7,080 ft)

History
- Designer: James Brunlees
- Opening date: 1830 (Iron pier, 1889)
- Southend-on-Sea district map

Southend Pier Act 1829
- Act of Parliament
- Parliament of the United Kingdom
- Long title: An Act for making and maintaining a Pier at or near Southend in the Parish of Prittlewell in the County of Essex, and for making convenient Approaches to and from the same.
- Citation: 10 Geo. 4. c. xlix

Dates
- Royal assent: 14 May 1829
Other legislation
Repealed by	Essex Act 1987

Status: Repealed

Text of statute as originally enacted

Southend Pier is a major landmark in Southend-on-Sea, Essex, United Kingdom. Extending 1.33 miles (2.14 km) into the Thames Estuary, it is the longest pleasure pier in the world. The bill to build the new pier, to replace a previous timber jetty, received royal assent as the Southend Pier Act 1829 (10 Geo. 4. c. xlix) in May 1829 with construction starting in July 1829. The timber pier was replaced by an iron pier that opened to the public in August 1889. The Southend Pier Railway, opened in the early 1890s, was the first pier railway in the country.

The pier played a role through both of the world wars, such as during World War I when ships housing German prisoners of war were moored off the pierhead. In the Second World War, the pier was taken over by the Royal Navy and was renamed HMS Leigh, closing to the public in September 1939. Following the war, around six million people visited the pier in 1949, exceeding pre-war visitor numbers, with new attractions opening during the 1950s. A period of decline began during the 1970s, with structural deterioration that led the council to announce closure plans in 1980. Following protests, the pier remained open and a grant in 1983 allowed renovation work to take place, including for a new pier railway that was opened in May 1986 by Princess Anne.

The pier has experienced several fires, notably in 1959, 1976, 1995 and 2005. The fire in 1976 was followed by another a year later, during a period when the pier was already in decline and resulted in the closure of the railway. In 1995, the fire caused significant damage requiring reconstruction of the deck. Just ten years later in 2005, another fire destroyed much of the wooden planking and caused significant damage to the old pierhead and surrounding structures.

Sir John Betjeman, English poet and broadcaster, once said that "the Pier is Southend, Southend is the Pier". The pier is a Grade II listed building.

== History ==
=== Creation ===
Seaside towns became popular with tourists in the second half of the 18th century. By the early 19th century, Southend was growing as a holiday resort. At the time, it was thought that spending time by the sea had health benefits and since it was close to the capital, many Londoners would come to Southend for this reason. Travellers would often arrive by sailing boat or later by Thames steamer, which presented problems as boats could only dock during high tide. The Southend coast consists of mudflats that extend far from the shore, with a high tide depth that seldom exceeds 5.5 metres (18 ft). Large boats were unable to port near to the beach and no boats could approach at low tide. Many potential visitors would travel beyond Southend on to Margate or other resorts with better docking facilities.

To counter this trend, local dignitaries pushed for a pier to be built that would allow boats to reach Southend at all tides. The campaign was led by Southend resident Sir William Heygate, who was the former Lord Mayor of the City of London. Heygate was mobbed by crowds upon returning from London with the news that the bill for construction had been passed.

=== Early pier ===
==== Wooden pier ====
During the late 1820s, a bill for construction of a pier to replace the existing jetty was put to the House of Commons and subsequently referred to the House of Lords where it was approved on 7 May 1829. On 14 May 1829, the Southend Pier Act 1829 (10 Geo. 4. c. xlix) received royal assent. Just over two months later on 25 July, the Lord Mayor of London, Sir William Thompson laid the foundation stone of the first section of the pier. By June 1830, a 180-metre (590 ft) wooden pier was opened, using around 90 oak trees in its construction. The pier was extended around 1834 and again in 1846 to stretch just over a mile before a later rebuild extended it to a length of around 1.3 miles (2.1 km). By 1848, it was the longest pier in Europe at 2,100 metres (7,000 ft). It was sold by the original owners for £17,000 (equivalent to £1,713,466 in 2025) in 1846 after getting into financial difficulties.

==== Iron pier ====
By the 1850s the London, Tilbury and Southend Railway had reached Southend, and with it a great influx of visitors from east London. The many visitors took their toll on the wooden pier and in 1875 it was sold to the Southend Local Board. In 1887, the board decided to replace the pier with a new iron pier, built alongside the old wooden one. Wood from the old pier was used in the construction of a new mayoral chair in 1892. A mortuary located under the old pier remained after construction of the new pier, despite complaints about the smell by passers-by and traders in 1898.

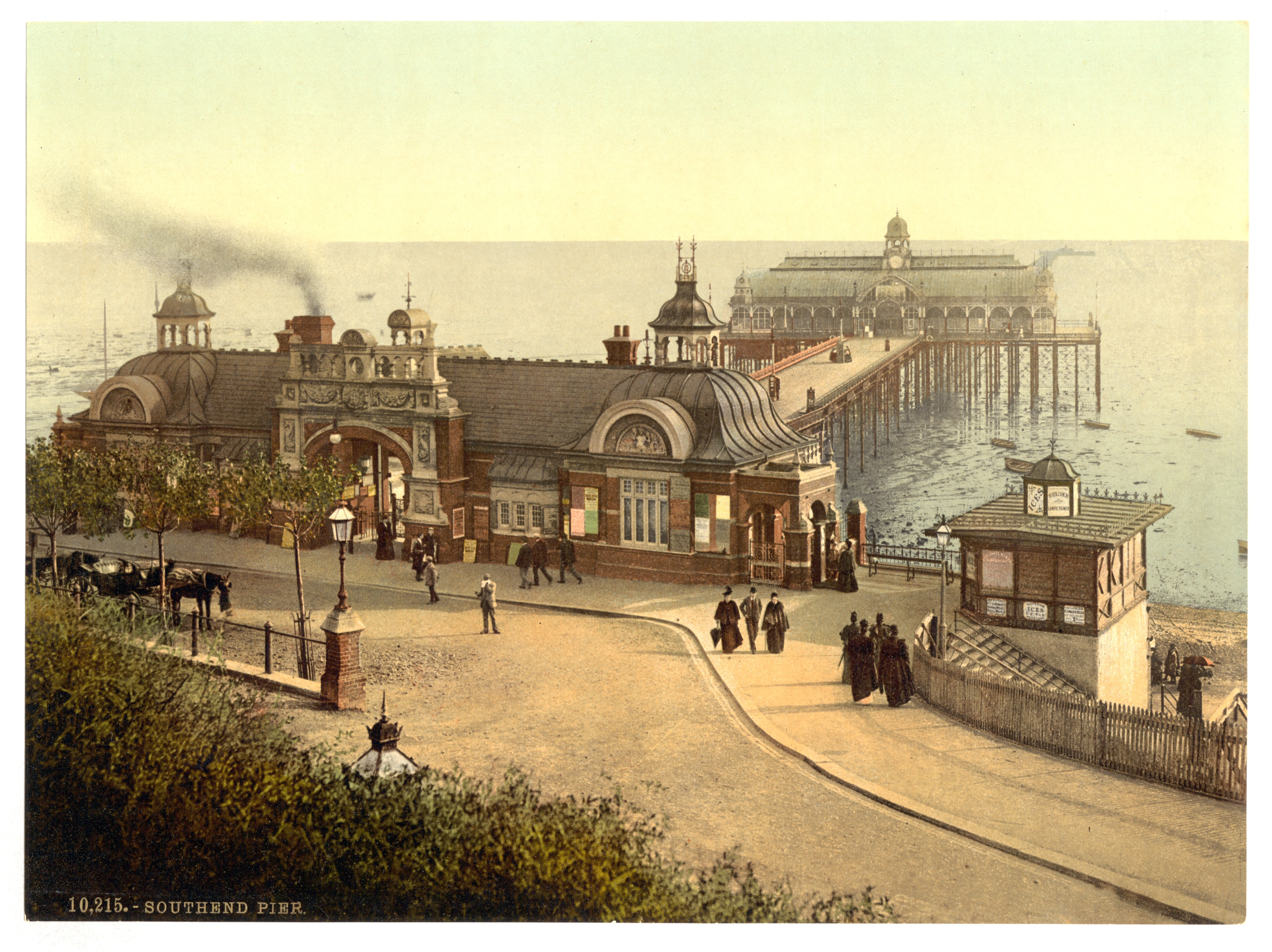
Pier during the late 19th century

The pier was designed by James Brunlees, who in 1860 had built Southport Pier, the first iron pier at Southport, Lancashire. Work began in early 1887 and the new pier was opened to the public in August 1889, built at a cost of £68,920 (equivalent to £7,657,038 in 2025). A single track electric railway starting running the following year and was the first pier railway in the country. Its first extension was added in 1897 and formally opened in January 1898.

Statistics reported in 1903 suggested that during the year, around 1 million people had paid admission to use the pier while 250,000 passengers had alighted from pleasure steamboats. An upper deck with a bandstand and shops opened in 1908. Later that year on 23 November, a Thames Conservancy ship broke from its moorings and smashed through the pier, leaving a large hole and over £650 (equivalent to £67,606 in 2025) worth of significant structural damage, although reports from the time suggested the damage could have cost up to £1,000 (equivalent to £104,009 in 2025).

=== War and inter-war period ===
During the early part of World War I, three prison ships were moored off the pier, the first of which held German soldiers who had been captured in France, while the other two mostly held civilians. Prisoners would walk along the high street and the length of the pier to board the ships. The Admiralty, responsible for the Royal Navy during the war, paid for a war signal station at the pierhead, although the pier remained open for recreation. During the spring of 1915, prisoners on the ships were moved away from the pier to other camps due to safety concerns.

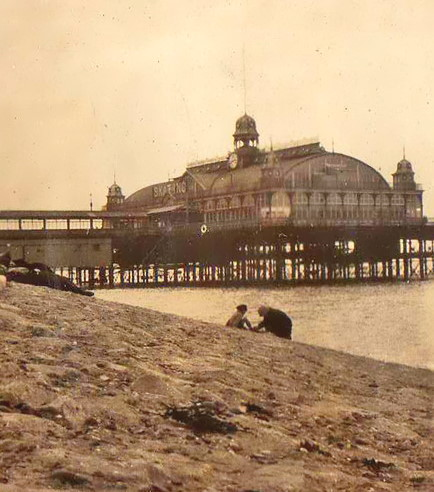
Pavilion in 1923. Destroyed by fire in 1959 and replaced in 1962 by a bowling alley, also destroyed by fire in 1995. Now open decking

The years following the war saw the heyday of Southend Pier and it became necessary to increase facilities to allow for a greater number of boats to dock. The pier was extended in 1927 with construction undertaken by Peter Lind & Company who still trade today. The 99 metres (326 ft) extension cost £58,000 (equivalent to £3,185,710 in 2025) and was formally opened on 8 July 1929 by the Duke of Kent. The extension, named the Prince George Extension, allowed for an increased number of steamers to visit the pier. In June 1931, brewery drayman Ernest Turner was on a works outing from Ansell's brewery in Birmingham when he fatally fell underneath an oncoming train.

Southend Pier celebrated its centenary on 23 July 1935 when Lord Richie of Dundee, chairman of the Port of London Authority unveiled a bronze plaque on the pierhead. The centenary was not celebrated in 1930, which would have been 100 years after its first opening, as 1835 reflects the date when the Admiralty began to include Southend Pier on their navigation charts.

==== Wartime operations ====
During the Second World War, Southend Pier was taken over by the Royal Navy and was renamed HMS Leigh, closing to the public on 9 September 1939 and becoming the Naval Control Centre for the Thames Estuary. A 90-minute German air raid on 22 November 1939 was deterred by the pier's defenders. The pier served as a convoy mustering point by organising 3,367 convoys over the course of the war, offering protection from dive bombers by using inflated barrage balloons. Out of over 84,000 ships that passed Southend, the only casualty was the SS Richard Montgomery, containing over 1,500 tons of explosives. The ship, which sank in August 1944 and split in half, is visible from the North Kent coast and Southend beach at low tide, although subject to a 500-metre exclusion zone due to the present day threat posed to navigation and the surrounding area.

=== Post-war ===
Following World War II, the pier reopened for visitors and saw nearly six million visitors during 1949, exceeding pre-war levels. The pier railway trains were replaced in 1949 with stock similar to those used on the London Underground and around 5 million passengers travelled on the railway in its first year after reopening. In the 1950s, more attractions on the pier opened including the Dolphin Café, Sun Deck Theatre, the Solarium Café and a Hall of Mirrors. In 1959, a fire destroyed the pavilion located at the shore end, trapping over 500 people on the other side of the fire who had to be rescued by boat. The pavilion was replaced by a ten-pin bowling alley in 1962 at a time when Southend was reaching its heyday.

==== Decline ====
The use of the pier slowly began to decline and with it the structure began to deteriorate. In 1971, a child's injury prompted a survey, leading to repairs and replacement to much of the pier railway throughout the decade. In response, the council allocated £370,000 over two years, starting in 1972, to ensure the pier remained maintained. In 1976, a fire destroyed much of the 1908 pierhead. Firefighting efforts faced obstacles due to a limited water supply, requiring the deployment of crop-spraying light aircraft to provide additional water. The investigation into the cause was inconclusive, with the official reason recorded as unknown, although a discarded cigarette end was considered likely. In the early stages of the fire, many bystanders observed but did not call the fire brigade. Conditions for fighting the fire were unfavourable, with strong winds and a low tide. A fire in November 1977 severely damaged the bowling alley and in October the following year, safety concerns led to the closure of the pier railway. By then, British holidaymakers were turning to package holidays abroad.

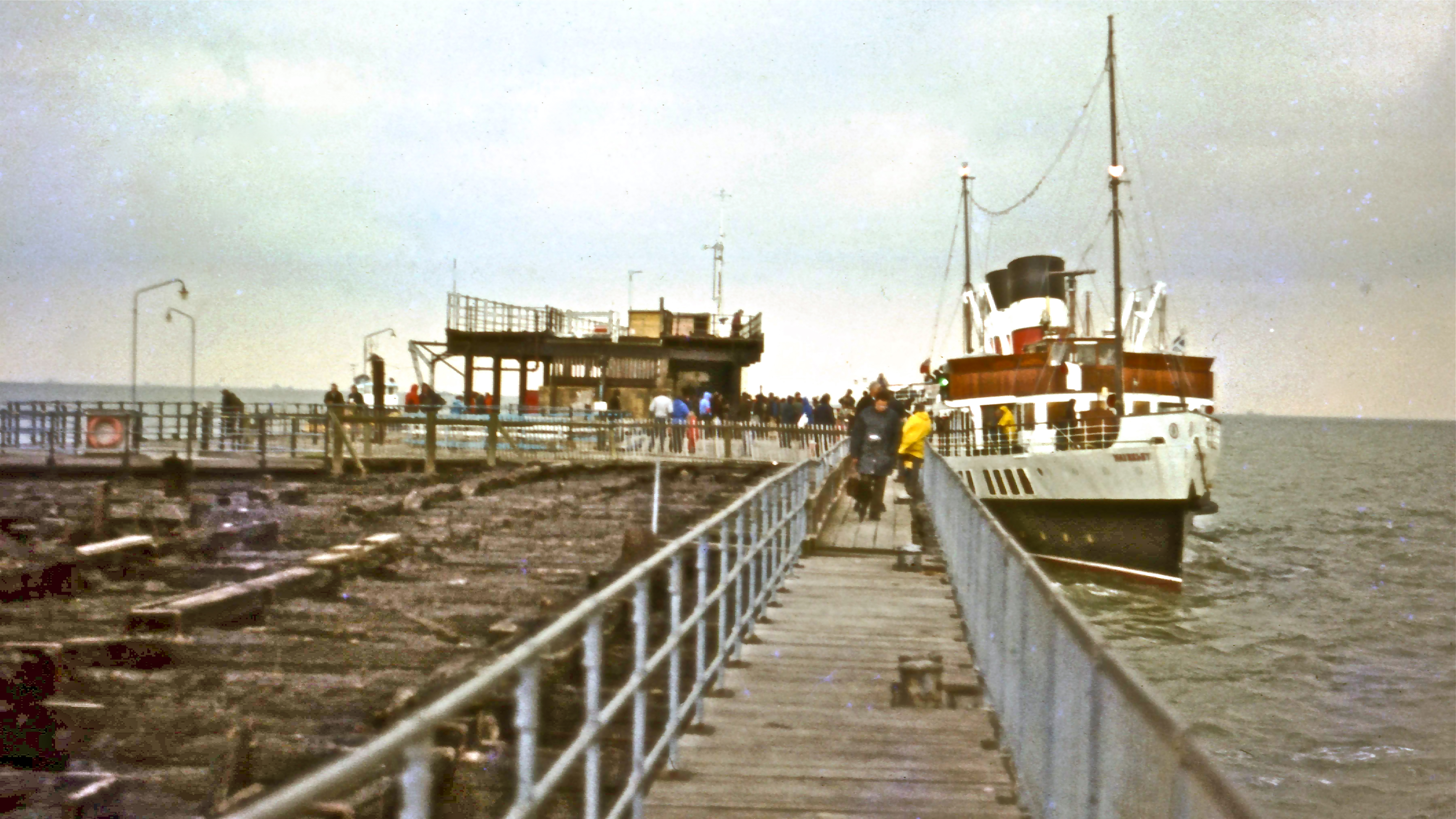
Burnt section in 1983

In 1980, the council announced plans to close the pier. Following protests, the council allowed the pier to remain open until a solution could be found. In 1983, a turning point occurred when the Historic Buildings Committee granted funds for extensive repairs. The repair work commenced in 1984 and concluded in May 1986 when Princess Anne officially inaugurated the new pier railway, naming the two new trains after Sir John Betjeman and Sir William Heygate. The total cost of repairs, including new buildings and pier trains, was around £1.5 million (equivalent to £4,645,846 in 2025).

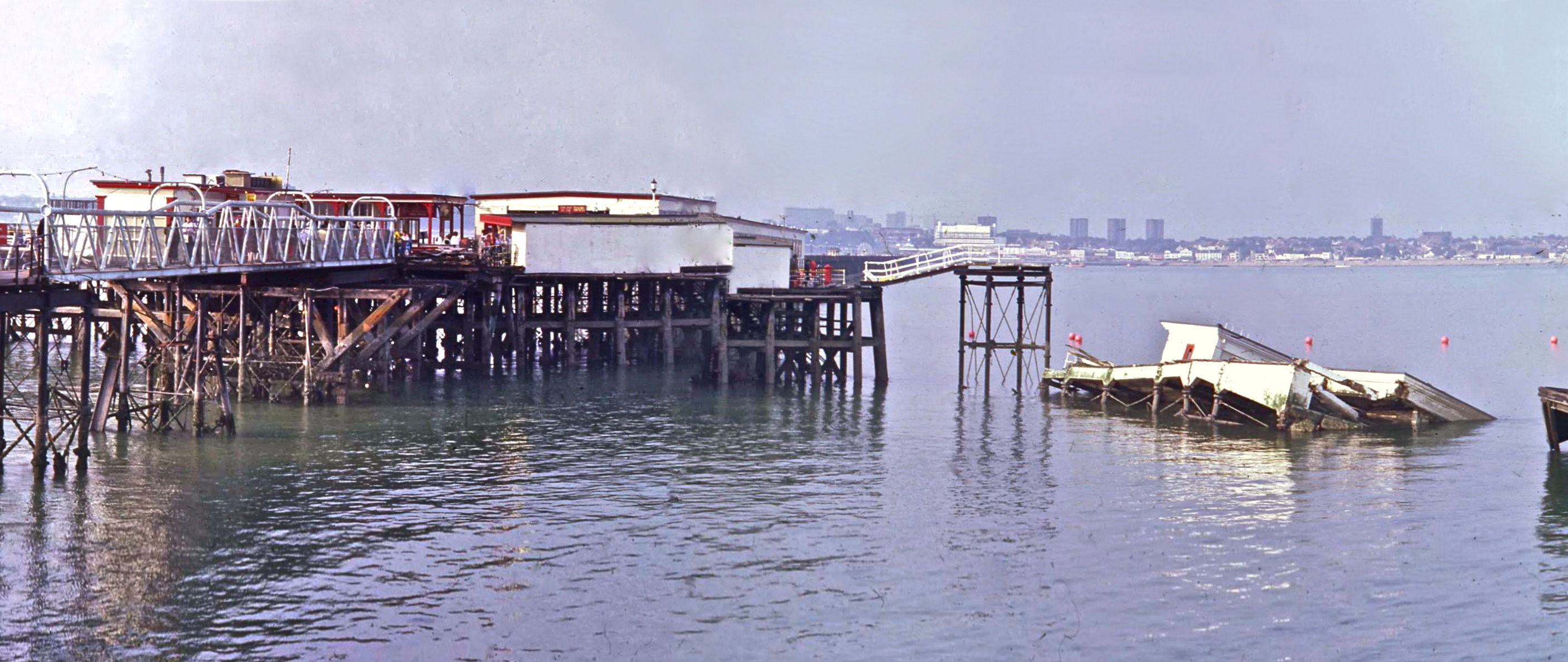
Temporary bridge, railway station and collapsed section in 1987

On 30 June 1986, a 54.9-metre (180 ft) tanker named Kings Abbey crashed into the pier, severing a 21.3-metre (70 ft) gap from the new pierhead and destroying the boathouse used by the lifeboat service, causing major structural damage due to the destruction of iron piles and supporting girders. While this was temporarily bridged to restore access, full repairs were not completed until 1989.

==== Fire and restoration ====
On 7 June 1995, an electrical fault ignited a fire in the bowling alley, spreading rapidly through the timber roof and onto the railway station within two hours, before being brought under control by the afternoon. While the railway track sustained some damage, the trains were unaffected. Repair costs amounted to around £680,000 (equivalent to £1,398,020 in 2025) approved by Southend Council's cabinet in January 2000, despite being £70,000 (equivalent to £143,914 in 2025) over the original estimate. The fire also damaged beyond repair the timber decking and supporting structure, necessitating a six-month reconstruction in 1998. Although insurance covered the majority of repair costs, the council had to contribute £26,000 (equivalent to £52,188 in 2025) from the pier's structural maintenance budget.

During the summer of 1999, former pirate radio station Radio Caroline moored their radio ship Ross Revenge at the pier-head for about a month. Conducting a 28-day legal broadcast under a restricted service licence to the local area, a power cut left the pier without power for two days. Radio Caroline provided electricity via a spare generator aboard their ship, enabling shops and attractions to function until the mains supply could be restored. A subsequent lightning strike disabled their rear tower and took out the transmitter.

=== 21st century ===
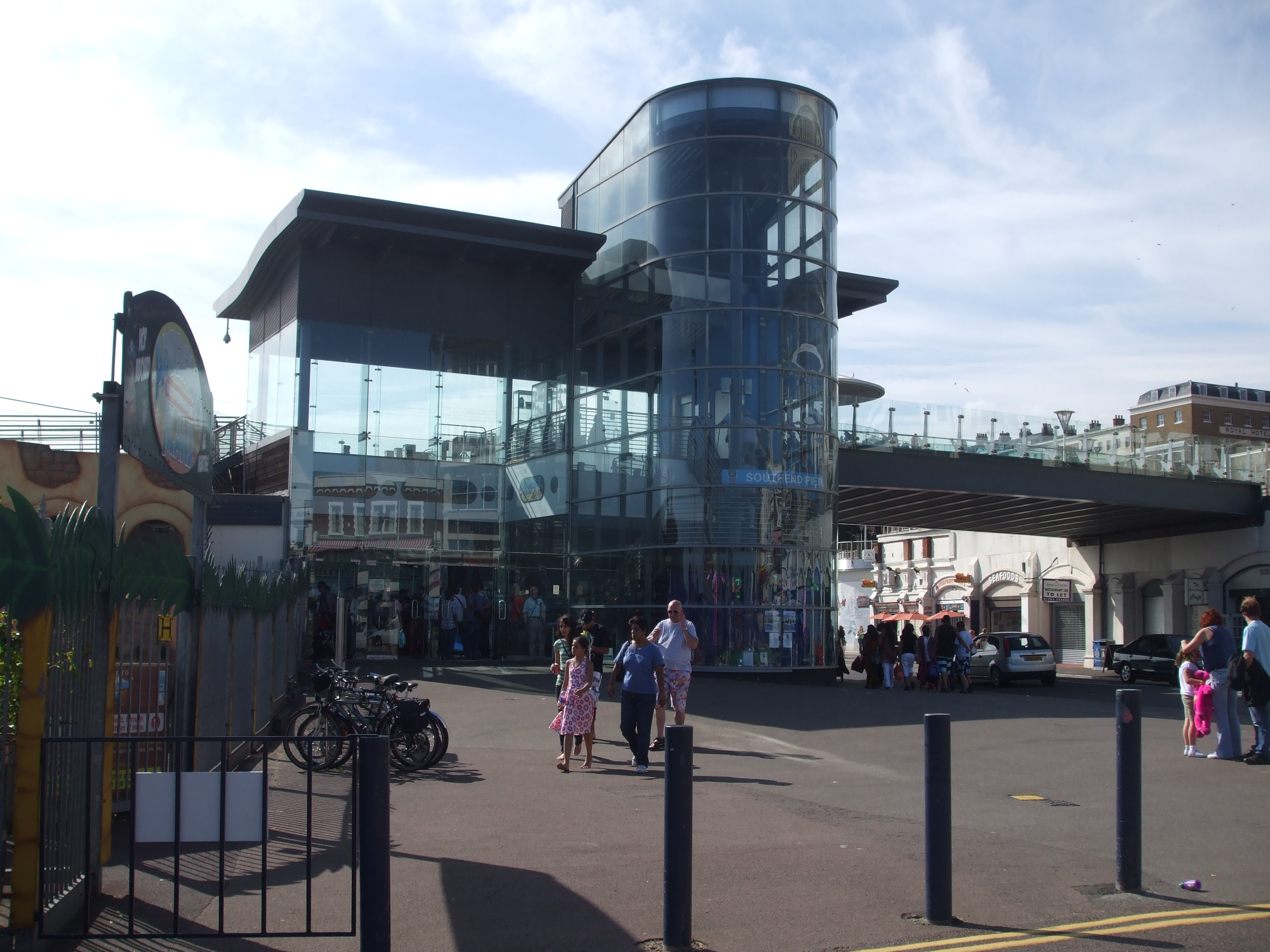
The new shoreward end of Southend Pier

Southend Council invested in the pier during the 21st century to restore it as a visitor attraction, with funding coordinated by the "S-SHAPE" (Southend Seafront, High Street and Pier Enhancements) project. A bid for European Objective 2 funding was agreed in principle in October 1999, to spend money on improving the area around the town centre and pier.

The pierhead was extensively redeveloped during 2000–01, including construction of a new lifeboat station in partnership with the RNLI. A significant proportion of the £500,000 cost was bequeathed by Peter Royal, a yachtsman who died in 1988. The new station is constructed in glass to give a strikingly modern style. It also houses the Southend Pier Museum and a gift shop relating to the history of the RNLI and lifeboats. The museum features exhibits about the pier's history, including a restored working pier signal box, a tram and train carriages, photos, period costumes, and a small collection of working old penny slot machines.

In 2003, the shoreward end of the pier was redeveloped as part of the seafront and town centre regeneration, with a new contemporary steel and glass entrance causing controversy due to its contrast with the Victorian pier. A new pier bridge was built raised to enable taller vehicles to pass under it, as a recurring problem had been double-decker buses getting stuck underneath. A visitor and tourist information centre was also built and opened in 2004, along with a new lift to improve access to the information centre and pier railway.

==== 2005 fire ====
On 9 October 2005, a fire severely damaged much of the pierhead including the railway station, pub and various shops. The fire was thought to have started in McGinty's Bar at around 21:10, but due to the location and the extent of damage, the cause was never formally determined, although assumed as an accident. No one was reported injured, although firefighters encountered difficulties extinguishing the blaze as pumps installed on the pier were rendered ineffective. Contrary to reports, the low tide at the time was not believed to be a contributing factor towards the difficulties faced by fire crews. The Southend lifeboat was deployed to transport the first firefighters to the scene.

Much of the wooden planking was destroyed, but the main iron structure was largely undamaged. The Pier Railway tracks buckled from the intense heat of the fire. The Essex Fire Service report noted that if a sprinkler system had been in use, the fire could have been quickly extinguished, whereas the lack of fire alarms throughout much of the pier meant fire crews were alerted by up to 90 minutes later than they otherwise would have been. Shortly after the fire, pieces of charred planking appeared for sale on eBay with the proceeds apparently going to the RNLI.

The pier reopened to the public on 1 December 2005 and in 2007 was voted 'Pier of the Year'.

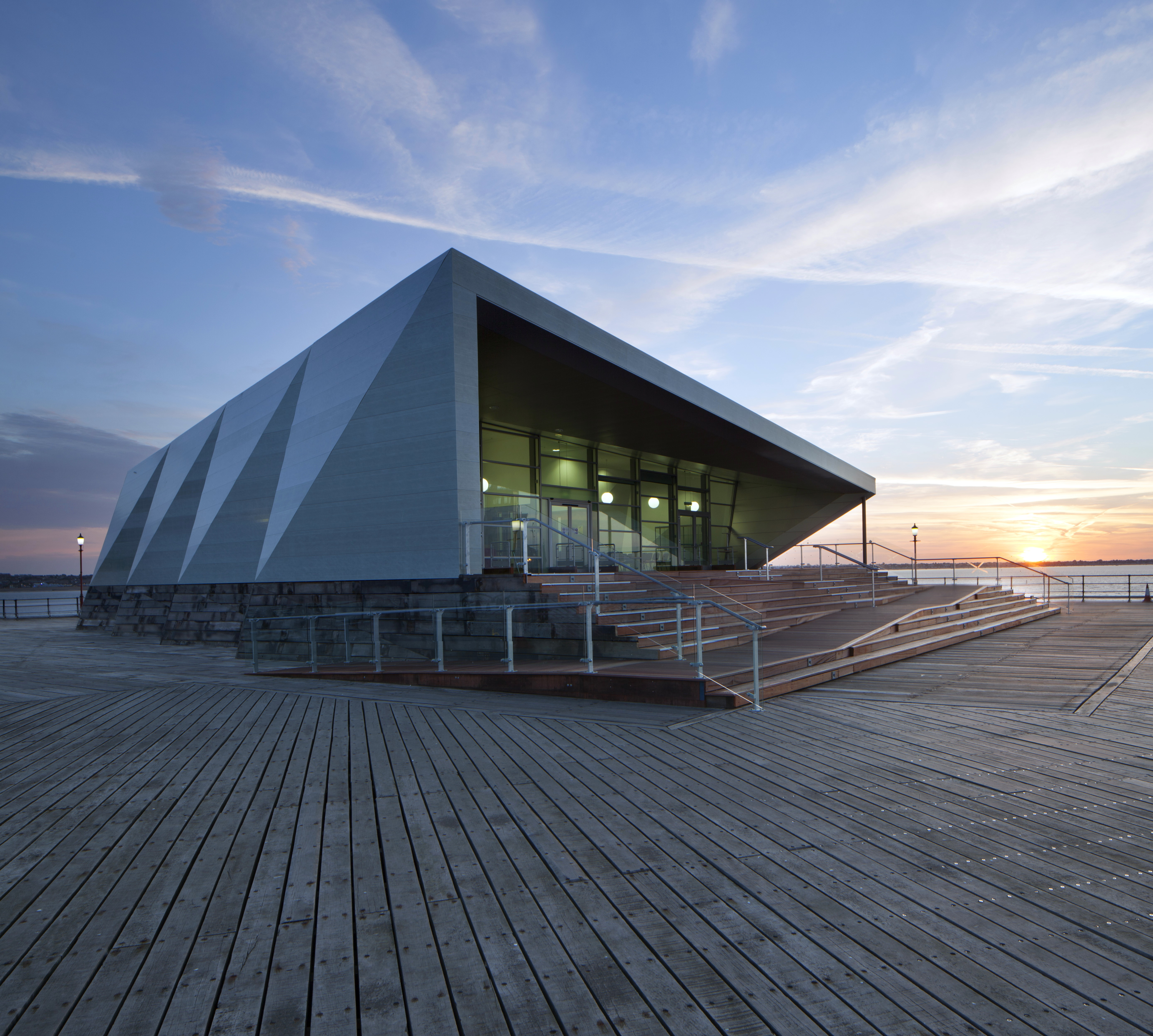
Southend Pier Royal Pavilion

==== Cultural Centre ====
On 15 September 2009, Southend Borough Council announced the winner of a design contest for a new pierhead – a Sweden-based architecture firm, White, with London-based structural engineers Price & Myers. The winning Culture Centre design was carried out by Sprunt Architects in the UK. Kier Group was the contractor responsible for the construction of the £3million Pier Pavilion which is used in part as a Cultural Centre.

The company's winning entry was a design called Sculpted by Wind and Wave and was chosen from 73 international and local entries. The contest was run by the Landscape Institute for the council.

On 17 May 2012, the structure for a new Pier Pavilion was lowered onto the pier and on 21 July it opened to the public. It is used as a theatre and for art exhibitions, holding up to 185 people. Recycled pier timber was used in the construction of beach huts on Shoebury's East Beach in 2013.

== Railway ==
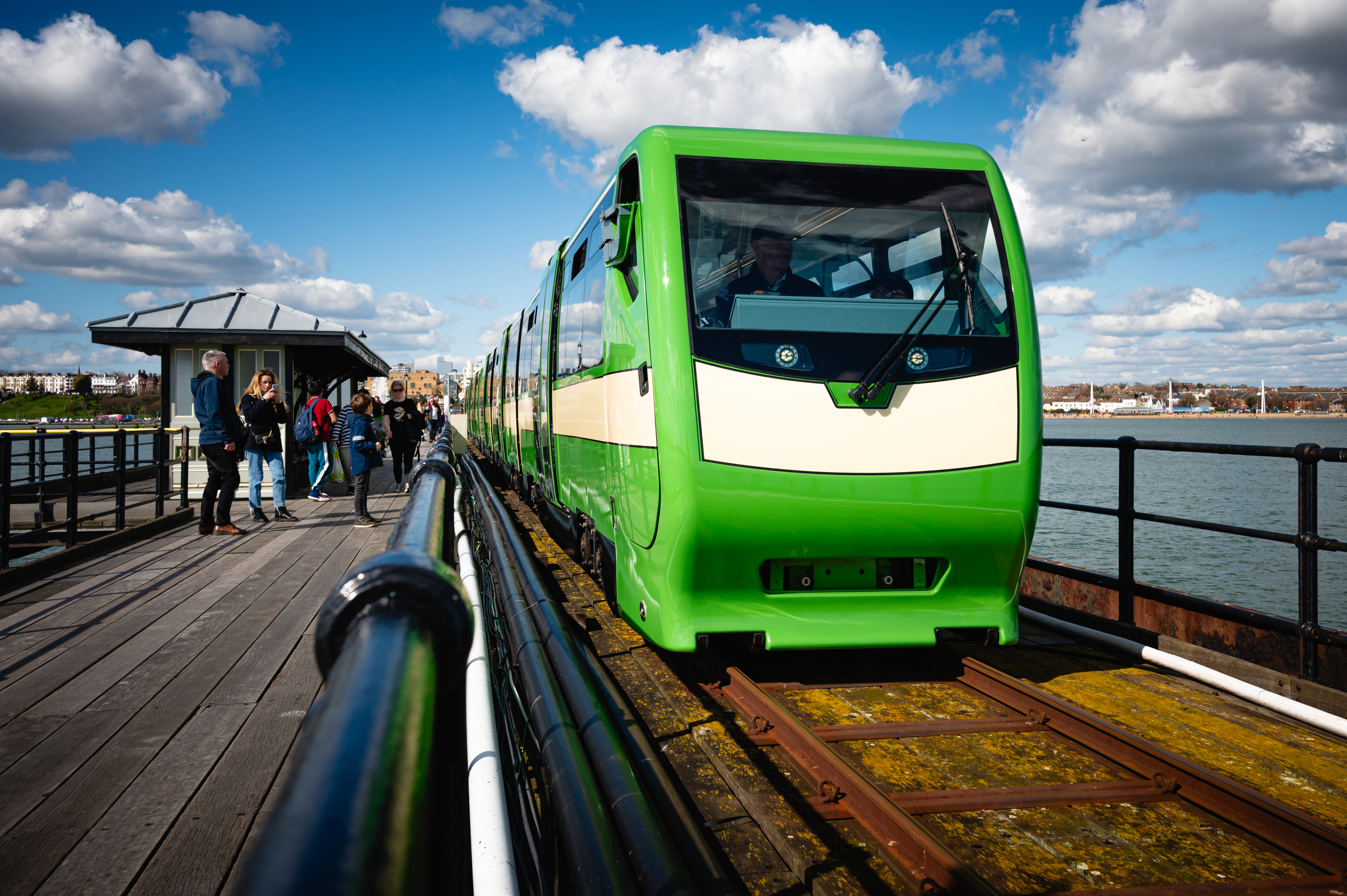
Severn-Lamb electric train

The pier railway runs the length of Southend Pier, providing public passenger transport from the shore to the pierhead. It operates every day on which the pier is open, providing a quarter or half-hourly service.

The original wooden pier built in 1830 employed a horse tramway from 1846, to convey goods and visitors to the pierhead. In 1890, with the construction of the iron pier, Cromptons installed an electric tramway which ran the full length by 1891. In 1949, the rolling stock was replaced with new trains that shared a similar design to those in operation on the London Underground.

In October 1978, the electric railway closed due to deterioration and the cost of repairs. It was reopened on 2 May 1986 using two new diesel trains on a simplified single track with a passing loop. Pierhead station was temporarily resited due to the fire in late 2005, until a new, modern structure was opened on the original site in September 2009.

== Lifeboat station ==
One of the Southend-on-Sea lifeboat station's two boathouses is located at the pierhead of Southend Pier. It houses an B-class (Atlantic 85) Inshore lifeboat, and a smaller D-class (IB1), both of which are launched by davit into the deep water adjoining the pier. The boathouse is a modern structure which incorporates crew accommodation and offices, an RNLI shop, and a viewing gallery from which visitors can view the lifeboats. It is topped by a sun deck to which the public has access. Lifeboat crews use an electric buggy, complete with sirens and blue flashing lights, to access this boathouse along the pier from the shore.

A lifeboat has been stationed on the pier since 1879. Initially lifeboats were launched using davits, much as they are today. However, in 1935, at a cost of £15,750, a new lifeboat. house was erected at the pierhead that provided a slipway for launching the lifeboat. This lasted until 1986, when the coaster, Kings Abbey collided with the pier and destroyed the boathouse. A temporary boathouse was used until 2002, when the current boathouse opened.

Awards and achievements
Preceded by Worthing Pier	National Piers Society; Pier of the Year; 2007	Succeeded by Deal Pier
Preceded by Garth Pier	National Piers Society; Pier of the Year; 2023	Succeeded by Cromer Pier
