= Grand Pier, Weston-super-Mare =

Pier in Weston-Super-Mare, Somerset, England

The Grand Pier
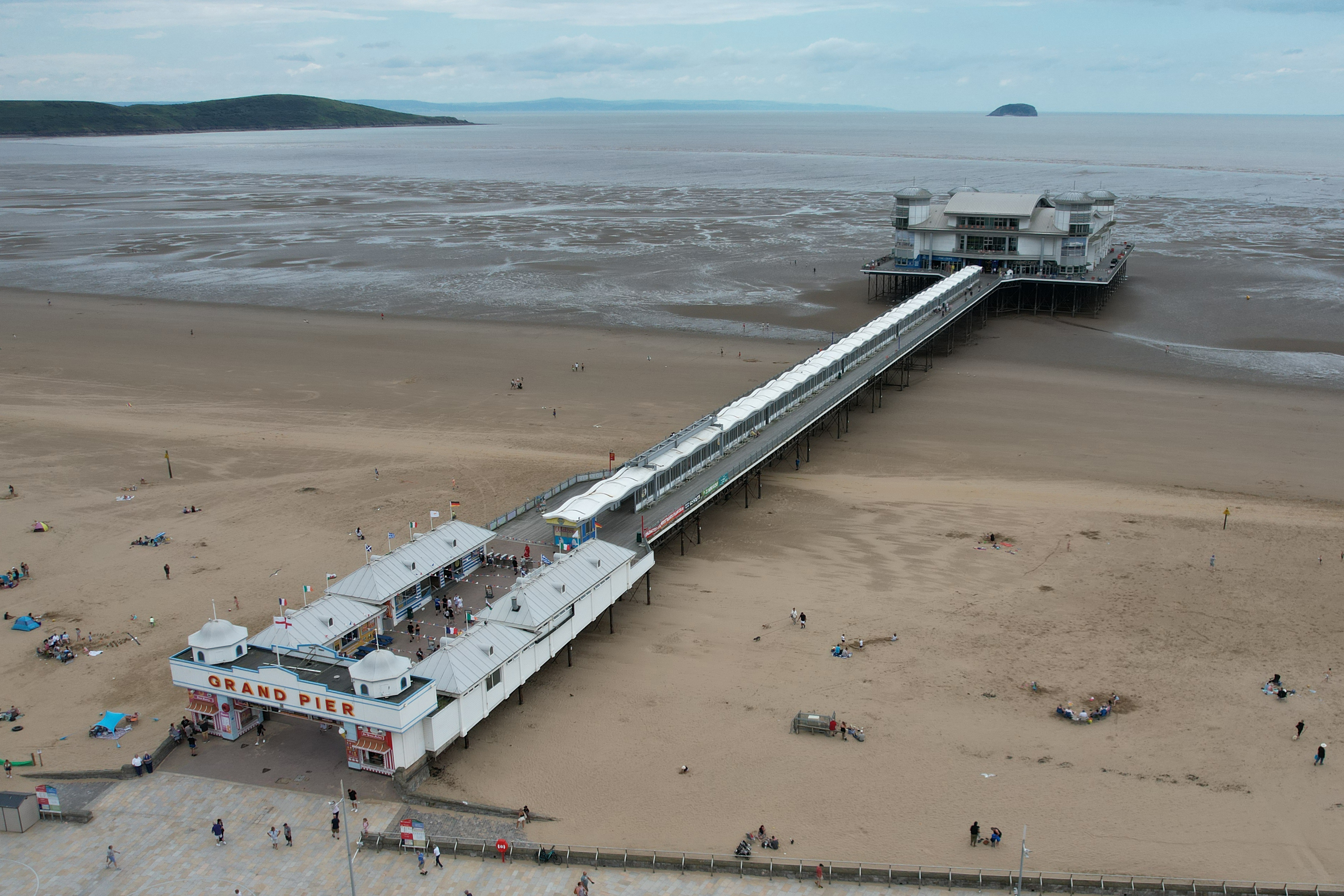
- The Grand Pier as of June 2026
- Type: Pleasure pier
- Location: Weston-super-Mare, North Somerset, England
- Coordinates: 51°20′52″N 2°58′56″W
- Official name: The Grand Pier
- Owner: Michelle & Kerry Michael
- Toll: £2 (Note: There is no toll charged for children in pushchairs, for visitors with event pre-bookings, or with unlimited ride wristbands.)

Characteristics
- Total length: 366 m (1,201 ft)
- Width: Promenade 13 m (43 ft); Pavilion 65 m (213 ft)

History
- Constructor: P. Munroe
- Opening date: 11 June 1904

The Grand Pier is a pleasure pier in Weston-super-Mare, North Somerset, situated on the Bristol Channel approximately 18 miles (29 km) southwest of Bristol. It opened in 1904 and has been Listed Grade II since 1983. It is 366 metres (1,201 ft) long.

The pier's pavilion has been destroyed by fire on two occasions, in 1930 and 2008. It is one of three piers in the town, along with Birnbeck Pier, which closed in 1994 and stands derelict, and Weston Revo Pier, which opened in 1995 as the Sealife Centre, and is now a restaurant and crazy golf venue.

== History ==
=== 1893–2008 ===
Weston-super-Mare Grand Pier Act 1893
- Act of Parliament
- Parliament of the United Kingdom
- Long title: An Act for incorporating and conferring powers on the Weston-super-Mare Grand Pier Company and for other purposes.
- Citation: 56 & 57 Vict. c. xxx

Dates
- Royal assent: 12 May 1893

Text of statute as originally enacted

Weston-super-Mare Grand Pier Act 1897
- Act of Parliament
- Parliament of the United Kingdom
- Long title: An Act to extend the time for the completion of the Pier and Works authorised by the Weston-super-Mare Grand Pier Act 1893 and for other purposes.
- Citation: 60 & 61 Vict. c. cxciv

Dates
- Royal assent: 6 August 1897

Text of statute as originally enacted

The pier was authorised by the Weston-super-Mare Grand Pier Act 1893 (56 & 57 Vict. c. xxx), and given an extension of time by the Weston-super-Mare Grand Pier Act 1897 (60 & 61 Vict. c. cxciv).

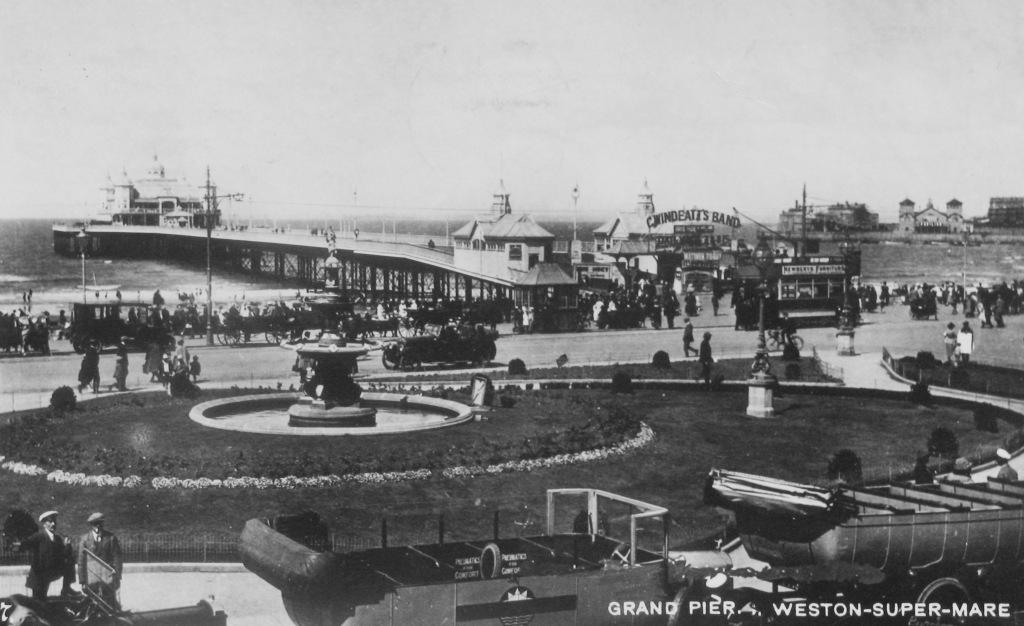
The pier with its original pavilion, prior to the 1930 fire

Work began on building the pier on 7 November 1903, with P. Munroe acting as engineer, and it opened on 11 June 1904. At the pier's end was a 2,000-seat theatre which was used as a music hall and for opera, stage plays and ballet. On 16 May 1907 an extension of the pier measuring 500 yards (1,500 ft) was opened, with the intention that the pier would be used as a docking point for boats to Cardiff. The dangerous currents in the bay made this too difficult, however, and the extension was demolished.

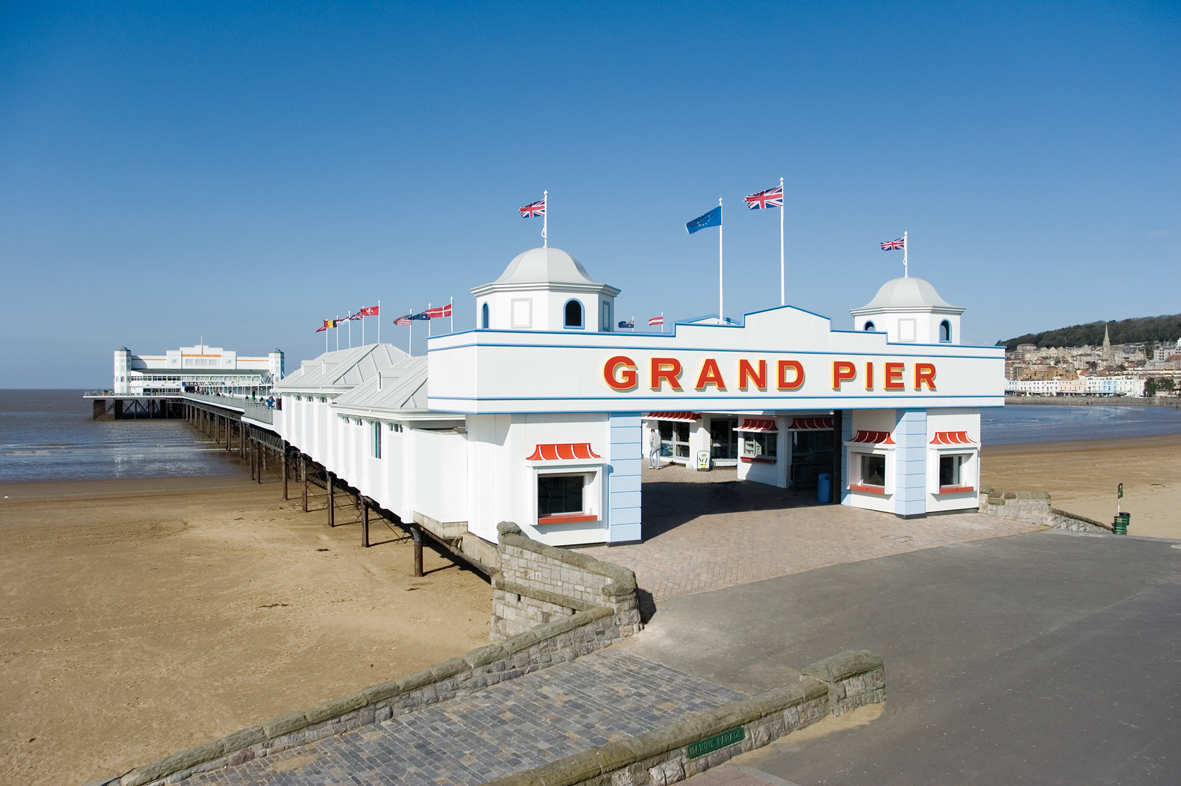
The pier with its second pavilion, prior to the 2008 fire

The theatre at the pier's end was destroyed by fire on 13 January 1930. As the building was underinsured the pier was put up for sale and bought by Leonard Guy, who opened a £60,000 new pavilion three years later. This second pavilion housed a large undercover funfair rather than a theatre. The pier was sold in 1946 to Mr. A. Brenner, who went on to improve the pier's facilities, adding new shops and an amusement arcade to the pavilion in the early 1970s. As a result of the extra investment, the pier became a Grade II listed building in 1974.

Brenner continued his ownership of the pier until 6 February 2008, when it was sold to brother and sister partnership Kerry and Michelle Michael. The pier immediately underwent a multi-million-pound revamp, which included a new branding scheme. £1,000,000 was spent installing a new go-kart track, a fully licensed bar, and a climbing wall into the pavilion.

=== 2008 fire ===
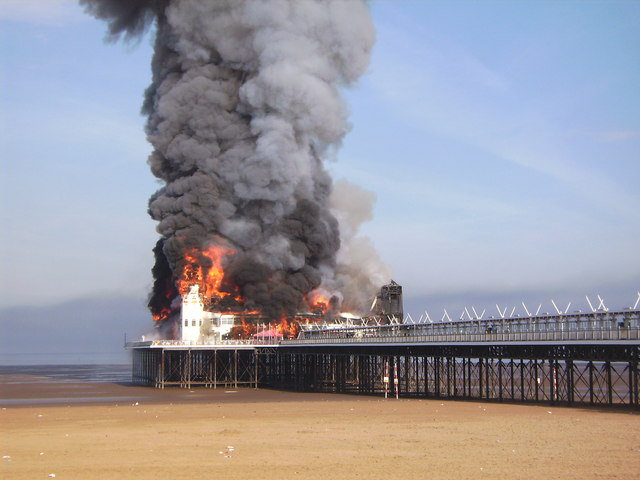
The pier on fire on 28 July 2008

At 01:35 BST on 28 July 2008, a fire at the foot of the north tower on the shoreward (eastern) end of the pavilion triggered the privately monitored fire alarm, but the Essex-based alarm monitoring company were unable to contact the key-holder by mobile phone and no further action was taken. It was not until 06:46 BST that the Avon Fire and Rescue Service was notified. It deployed 13 fire engines, special appliances, and more than 85 firefighters to tackle the blaze, but the pavilion was soon destroyed.

Robert Tinker, a Grand Pier employee, was later praised by the fire brigade as he braved the extreme intensity of the heat from the flames to rush around the side of the building to remove several gas canisters which had been stored within the premises; had these not been removed the fire brigade claimed that the blaze could have been much worse, with the possibility of local residents and traders needing to be evacuated. Preliminary investigations suggested that the fire started due to a number of deep fat fryers which had been located within the pavilion; however after further investigation this was later ruled out, as was arson. On 22 October 2008 at a news conference held by the fire brigade it was announced that the cause of the fire would be recorded as unknown, but that the most likely cause was electrical.

=== 2008–present ===
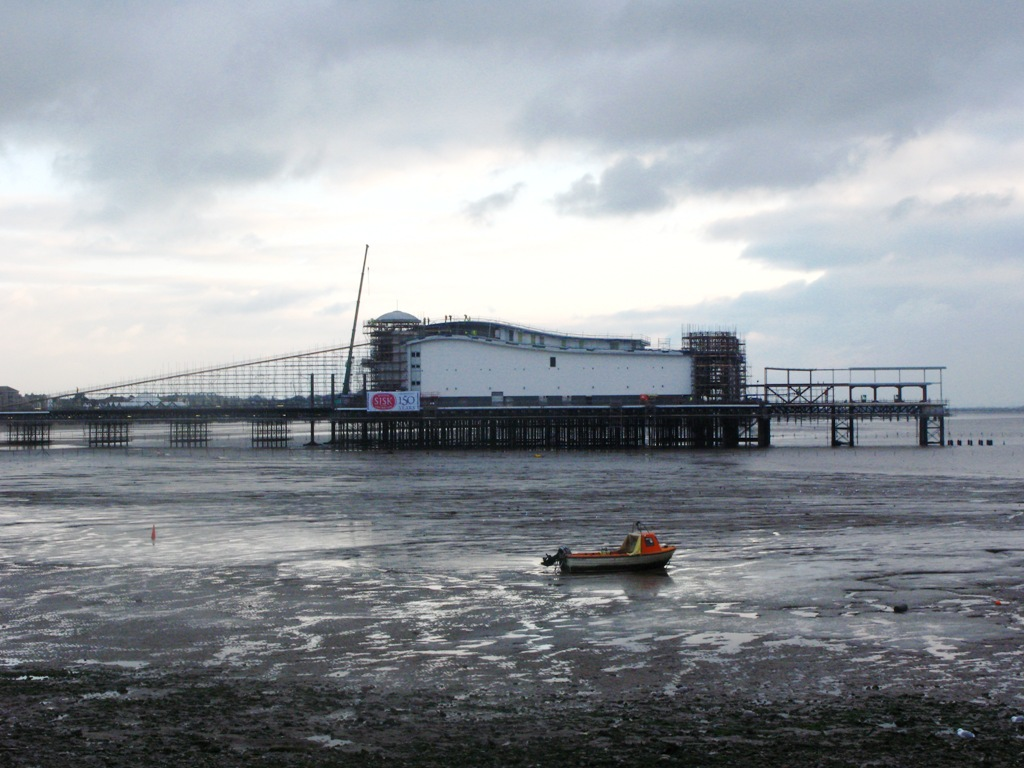
The pier's third pavilion under construction in February 2010

Work began dismantling the wreckage on 12 September 2008, and the Bristol architects Angus Meek won the contract to design the new pavilion on 15 October. North Somerset Council approved the plans on 12 March 2009. Contractors John Sisk and Son were selected to construct the new pavilion, which was expected to be completed by June 2010. Following delays, it instead opened in time for half-term break on 23 October 2010, having cost £39,000,000. The opening day attracted more than 52,000 visitors, and an estimated 100,000 for the whole weekend. The pier was officially reopened on 25 July 2011, by Anne, Princess Royal.

In January 2013, security company System 2 Security Limited was proven in court to be responsible for the fire damage to the pier in 2008 due to negligence. Kerry and Michelle Michael, the pier owners, were awarded £30,000,000 by a judge at Bristol Mercantile Court.

On 10 March 2019, the pier suffered a small fire and was evacuated, however the fire was contained and the pier reopened the following day.

== In popular culture ==
One scene from the film The Remains of the Day was filmed on the pier in 1992. The comedy television series Bliss filmed scenes on the pier in 2017. The reality television series Come Dine with Me, Don’t Tell the Bride and Flog It!, the news programme BBC Breakfast, and the cookery television series Saturday Kitchen have also filmed at the pier.

The Grand Pier was in the background of the photograph used for the cover of Oasis's 1995 single "Roll With It".

== Accolades ==
The pier won the National Piers Society Pier of the Year award in 2001, and again in 2011, becoming the first pier to win the award twice.

== See also ==
- Birnbeck Pier
- List of piers
- National Piers Society
- Grand Pier gallery at WikiMedia Commons

== Notes ==
Awards and achievements
Preceded by Boscombe Pier	National Piers Society; Pier of the Year; 2011	Succeeded by Swanage Pier
Preceded by Cromer Pier	National Piers Society; Pier of the Year; 2001	Succeeded by Southwold Pier
