= Worthing Pier =

Pier in Worthing, West Sussex

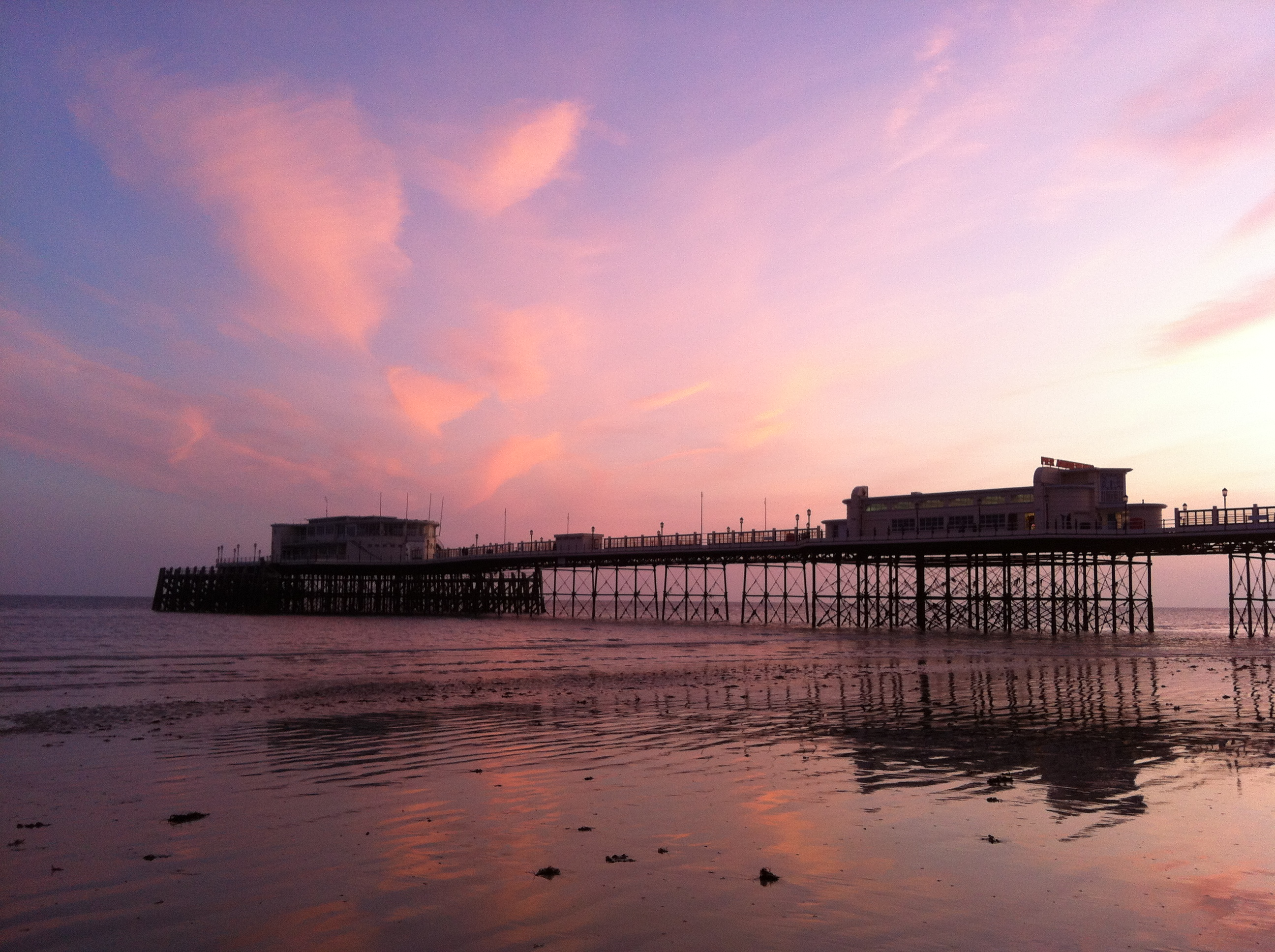
- Worthing Pier in October 2011
- Type: Pleasure Pier
- Coordinates: 50.807316°N 0.368923°W
- Official name: Worthing Pier

Characteristics
- Total length: 960 feet (290 m)

History
- Designer: Sir Robert Rawlinson
- Opening date: 12 April 1862

Worthing Pier is a public pleasure pier in Worthing, West Sussex, England. Designed by Sir Robert Rawlinson, it was opened on 12 April 1862 and remains open to the public. The pier originally was a simple promenade deck 960 ft (290 m) long and 15 ft (4.6 m) wide. In 1888 the pier was upgraded with the width increased to 30 ft (9.1 m) and the pier head increased to 105 ft (32 m) for a 650-seat pavilion to be built. It is a Grade II listed building structure.

The pier has been named Pier of the Year by the National Piers Society on two occasions, first in 2006 and again in 2019.

== History ==
By 1894 a steam ship began operation between Worthing Pier and the Chain Pier in Brighton, ten miles to the east. Over the Easter weekend that year, four-year-old Archie Miles became separated from his promenading family and managed to unwittingly stow away on . This set off a police hunt and he was only reunited with his parents after a night in the workhouse at Brighton and a telegram to his grandparents in Mayfield.

The first moving picture show in Worthing was seen on the pier on 31 August 1896 and is commemorated today by a blue plaque.

In March 1913, on Easter Monday, the pier was damaged in a storm, with only the southern end remaining, completely cut off from land. Later, it was affectionately named 'Easter Island'. A rebuilt pier was opened on 29 May 1914.

In September 1933 the pier and all but the northern pavilion were destroyed by fire. In 1935 the remodelled Streamline Moderne pier was opened, and it is this that remains today.

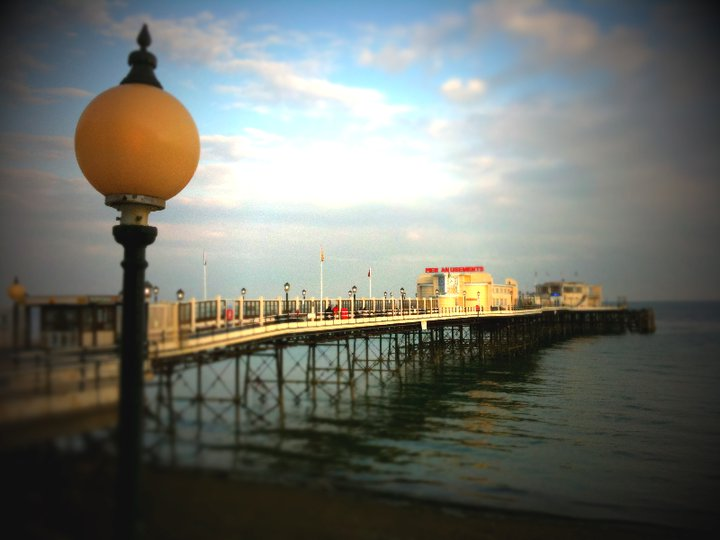
Worthing Pier in July 2010

Worthing Pier was sectioned in 1940 for fear of German invasion after the British retreat at Dunkirk. Army engineers used explosive to blow a 120ft. hole by in the pier to prevent it from being used as a possible landing stage in the event of an invasion.

The pier is owned by Worthing Borough Council (formerly Worthing Corporation).

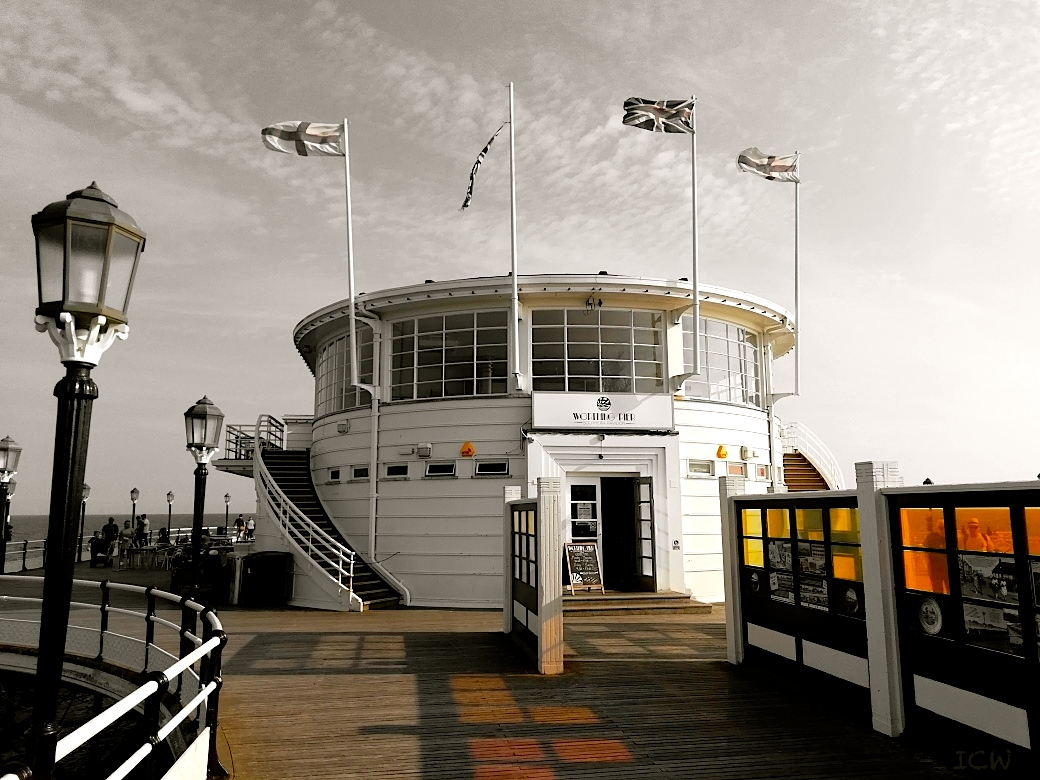
Worthing Pier, an Art Deco masterpiece, 2018

The Pavilion Theatre and Denton Cafe is situated at the northern, land end of the pier; at the middle is the 1935 amusement arcade, which from 1956 - 2006 carried a distinctive 'New Amusements' sign that was featured on the cover of the album To See the Lights (1996) by Britpop band Gene. Since 2006 the sign has changed from 'New Amusements' to 'Pier Amusements'.

The Southern Pavilion (the sea end) is currently home to restaurant, having undergone extensive renovation in 2021. From April 2014 it was a tearoom, and before that it was used as a nightclub named The Pier, which opened on 20 December 2007. Prior to that it contained a cafe, dance hall and a model railway layout.

Since 2008, Worthing Pier has been the home of the annual International Birdman competition, which moved to Worthing after it could no longer safely be held on the Bognor Regis Pier at Bognor Regis, some 15 miles (24 km) to the west. However, Birdman competitions were held in both towns from 2010. On 24 February 2016, it was announced that the Birdman will be cancelled for that year and that the Worthing Town Centre Initiative (WTCI) were unsure whether it would return in 2017.

In November 2009 during strong winds, two Worthing kite surfers became the first people to kitesurf over the pier.

Since 2012 the glass windows in the central windbreak have displayed over two hundred coloured-glass images. The "Windows on the Pier" project, initiated by the Worthing Journal, displays images of local societies, scenes and history of Worthing.

== Awards received ==
- 2006 - National Piers Society - Pier of the Year
- 2019 - National Piers Society - Pier of the Year

Awards and achievements
Preceded by South Parade Pier, Southsea	National Piers Society; Pier of the Year; 2019	Succeeded by Clacton Pier
Preceded by Llandudno Pier	National Piers Society; Pier of the Year; 2006	Succeeded by Southend Pier
