= National Piers Society =

British seaside piers charity

Logo

The National Piers Society (NPS) is a registered charity in the United Kingdom dedicated to promoting and sustaining interest in the preservation and continued enjoyment of seaside piers.

It was founded in 1979, with Sir John Betjeman as the first Honorary President and Tim Mickleburgh (Chair 1995-2003) as Honorary Vice President.

The NPS became a registered charity in 1999, and quarterly magazines have been published since 1987. The society also lobbies heritage bodies, lottery boards, local authorities and the media on pier issues. In 2014 it worked with English Heritage to bring out the book British Seaside Piers.

The Annual General Meeting takes place at a different resort each year, beginning in 1983. The meetings usually include private tours of nearby piers. In addition to establishing regional branches, the society is working to create a National Piers Museum.

The NPS maintains links with the relevant trade association, the British Association of Leisure Parks, Piers and Attractions, and the Paddle Steamer Preservation Society (PSPS).

In 2005, a limited company – The National Piers Society Ltd. – was created as the NPS trading arm.

== Pier of the Year award ==
Since 1996 the society has presented an annual Pier of the Year award, as voted by the society's members. The rules state that only piers currently open to the public, and piers which have not won the award in the last five years, are eligible. Past awards have been given to:

- Eastbourne Pier 1997
- Brighton Palace Pier 1998
- Clevedon Pier 1999
- Cromer Pier 2000
- Weston-super-Mare Grand Pier 2001
- Southwold Pier 2002
- Southport Pier 2003
- Blackpool North Pier 2004
- Llandudno Pier 2005
- Worthing Pier 2006
- Southend Pier 2007
- Deal Pier 2008
- Saltburn Pier 2009
- Boscombe Pier 2010
- Weston-super-Mare Grand Pier 2011
- Swanage Pier 2012
- Clevedon Pier 2013
- Penarth Pier 2014
- Cromer Pier 2015
- Cleethorpes Pier 2016
- Hastings Pier 2017
- Southsea South Parade Pier 2018
- Worthing Pier 2019
- Clacton Pier 2020
- Clevedon Pier 2021
- Garth Pier 2022
- Southend Pier 2023
- Cromer Pier 2024
- Llandudno Pier 2025
- Great Yarmouth Britannia Pier, 2026

The society also presents a triennial award for engineering excellence, the Peter Mason Award, named after a past Chairman.
