= Llandudno Pier =

Pier in Conwy County Borough, Wales

Coordinates: 53°19′54″N 3°49′30″W

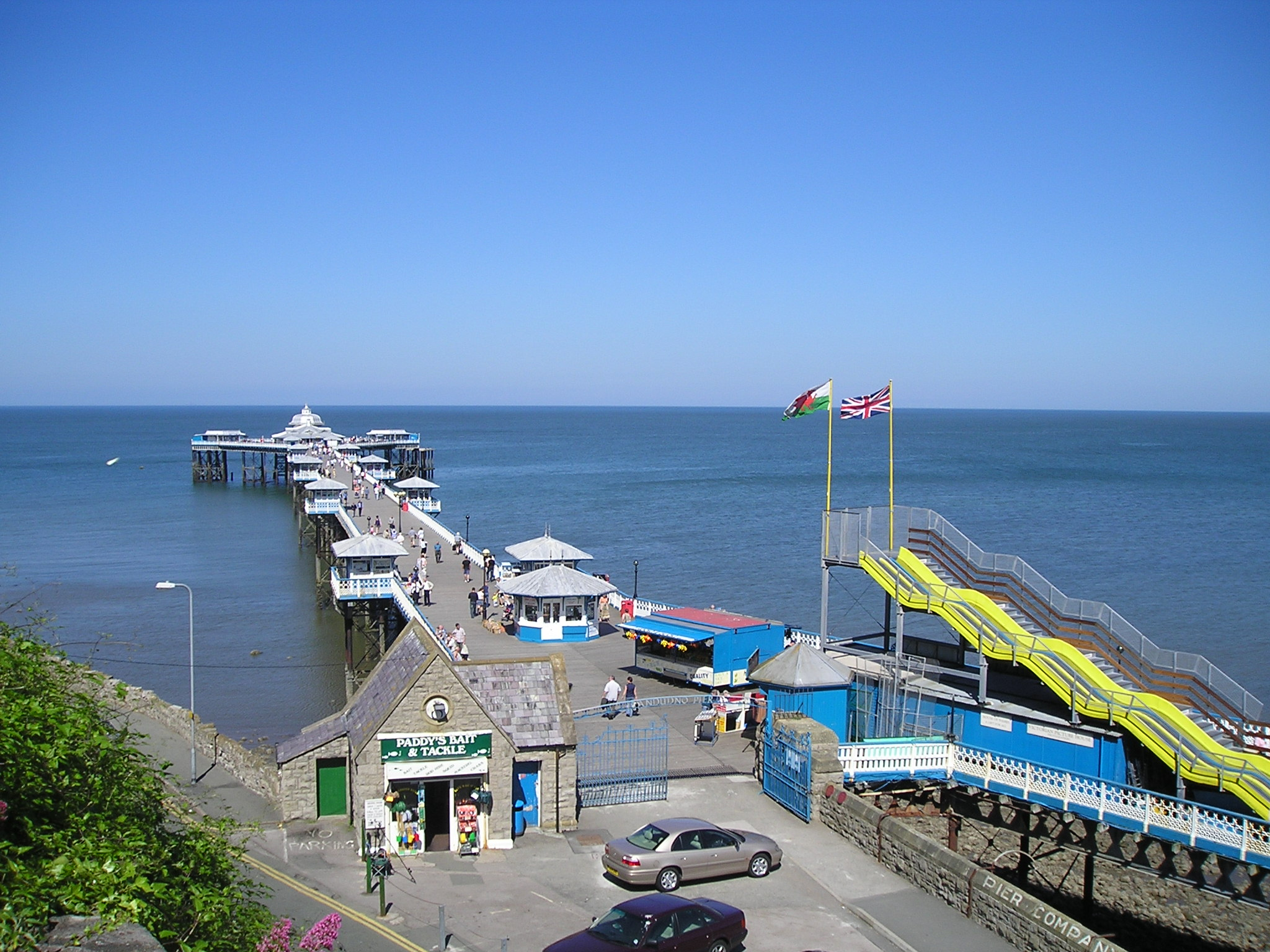
- Type: Pleasure Pier
- Location: Llandudno, Wales
- Official name: Llandudno Pier
- Owner: Tir Prince Leisure Group

Characteristics
- Total length: 2,295 ft (700 m)

History
- Designer: James Brunlees
- Constructor: Walter Macfarlane of Glasgow
- Opening date: 1 August 1877
- Listed: 24 March 1969 (Grade II*)

Llandudno Pier is a Grade II* listed pier in the seaside resort of Llandudno, North Wales. At 2,295 feet (700 m), the pier is the longest in Wales and the fifth longest in England and Wales. In 2005 and 2025, it was voted "Pier of the Year" by the members of the National Piers Society.

At the end of the pier is a deep-water landing stage, completely rebuilt for the third time in 1969, which is used by the Isle of Man Steam Packet Company for occasional excursions to Douglas, Isle of Man, and for an annual visit of the PS Waverley or the MV Balmoral preserved steamers.

== History ==
=== Early wooden pier ===
The pier had its origins in a much shorter pier of just 242 feet (74 m) built on 16 wooden piles, opened in 1858 by the St George's Harbour and Railway Company, which had just completed its branch line from Llandudno to Conwy via a junction with the Chester and Holyhead Railway near the present Llandudno Junction railway station, to which the branch was soon diverted. The original pier was constructed to protect the rights of its owners to a much more ambitious scheme to develop a major port in Llandudno Bay. The pier was severely damaged in the Royal Charter Storm of 25 October 1859, which caused the loss of 133 ships and 800 lives in British coastal waters. Although repaired and used for another 16 years, the pier was too short and could only be used by steam ships at high tide.

=== Construction ===
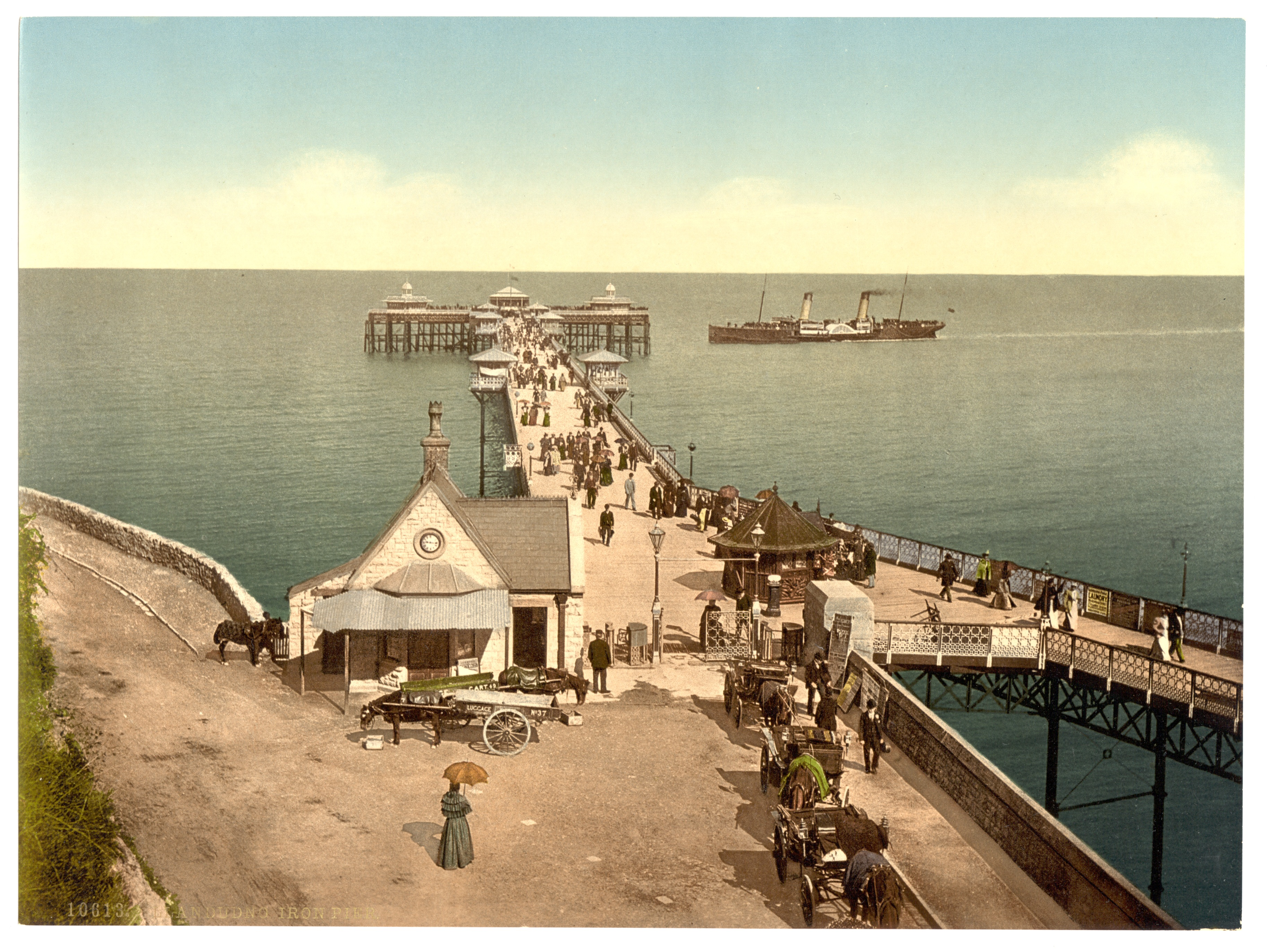
Llandudno pier, circa 1895

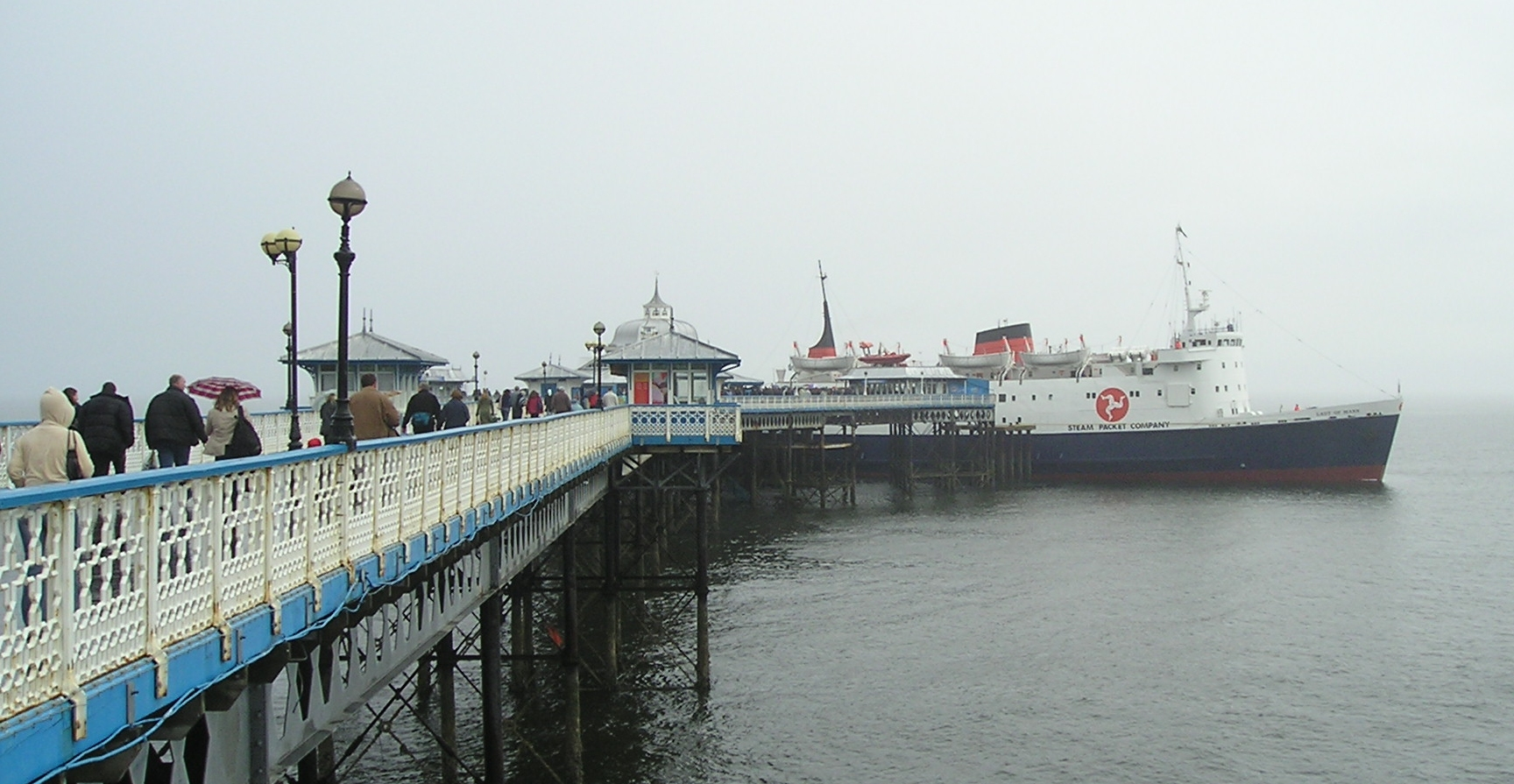
Penultimate sailing of the Lady of Mann to the Isle of Man, 26 May 2005

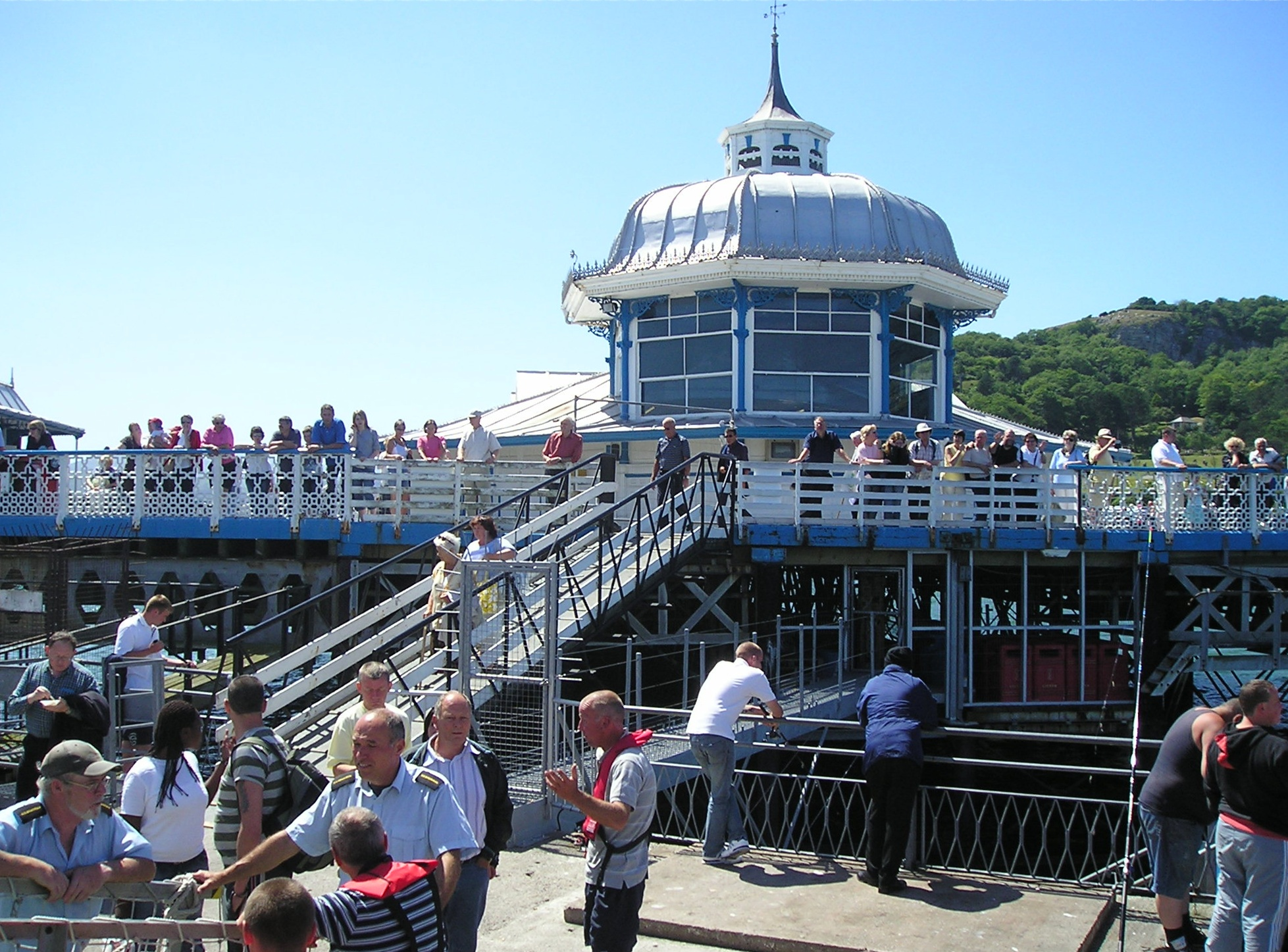
Pier head and landing stage viewed from the deck of the MV Balmoral, 14 July 2006

The pier was rebuilt through the efforts of the Llandudno Pier Company Limited (registered on 11 November 1875 by the firm Corser, Fowler, and Perks of 147 Leadenhall Street, London). The company's prospectus (offering 30,000 shares at ten pounds each) was published in early December 1875. The notice of application for a provisional order to authorise the project was published in The London Gazette of 23 November 1875 (pp. 5773–5774). The "principal mover" in this company was George Perks (1824–1892) of Perry Barr, Staffordshire. Perks was assisted by his cousin's son Robert William Perks (1849–1934), who was the company's solicitor. It was Robert Perks who did most of the speaking at the Company's first meeting of shareholders held in March 1876.

Designed by civil engineers Sir James William Brunlees (1816–1892, knighted 1886) and Alexander McKerrow (1837–1920), the pier was built by the contractor John Dixon for the Llandudno Pier Company. The original designs were approved in the Llandudno Pier Order 1876 on 29 May 1876 by Parliament passing the Pier and Harbour Orders Confirmation Act 1876 (39 & 40 Vict. c. xl). Following approval, the town's Improvement Commissioners and the Mostyn Estate revised designs for the ornamental ironwork, and elaborate kiosks were created by the architects Charles Henry Driver (1832–1900) and Charles H. Rew for Brunlees and McKerrow, in close collaboration with the Glasgow Elmbank foundry.

Construction of the new pier was reported to have cost around £30,000 (equivalent to £3,700,000 in 2024). The first pile was driven by Lord Arthur Hill-Trevor on 16 September 1876, initiating the start of a 10-month construction period. By this time, 110 feet (34 m) of pier had already been completed.

The pier was unusual in having two entrances, one on the promenade at North Parade and another, the original entrance, on Happy Valley Road (which is no longer used and is locked permanently). Between the two entrances is the Grand Hotel.

=== Opening ===
The first portion of Llandudno pier was opened to the public on 1 August 1877 by pier director Dr. Nicol. Although the pier was not completely finished by this time, the directors considered it to be sufficiently ready for public access. According to the North Wales Chronicle, when the pier was first opened, "a throng of visitors flocked upon it and it presented quite a lively appearance". The first steamboat to land passengers on the new pier was the Prince Arthur, which arrived in Llandudno at the beginning of May 1878.

=== Operation ===
The landing stage under the pier sustained light damage during a heavy storm in November 1878. A landward extension to the same design, still in deep water and also supported on iron columns, was approved by the Llandudno Pier Order 1880 and opened in 1884; a new landing stage was added in 1891.

Towards the end of 1907, the owners announced intentions to widen the pier, extend it by sea dredging and to construct pavilions and a tramway; through an application to the Board of Trade, these plans were approved in the Llandudno Pier Order 1908. In the early 1900s, the pier was often overcrowded during the summer season, causing inconvenience to passengers boarding and alighting from steamboats.

By the start of 1910, the pier was very profitable, allowing the directors to carry out extensive improvements at a cost of £10,000 (equivalent to £1,390,000 in 2024), which included widening most of the pier. Reports suggested that neighbouring towns were envious of the pier's success and the revenue it was bringing to Llandudno. Concerts in the pier's pavilion were very popular and profitable, with an average surplus of approximately £25 (equivalent to £3,500 in 2024) reported in November 1910, despite expenses of around £620 (equivalent to £86,200 in 2024) which included financing a music festival.

=== 20th century ===
In 1969, the landing stage was totally rebuilt in concrete and steel, which enabled its use by the largest Isle of Man steamers then in use. By 1972, the pier was well known for day trips by ferry to the Isle of Man, although at this time could itself boast pavilion concerts, vintage car rides and various amusements. The wooden decking has been extensively renewed in recent years, and the superstructure is maintained systematically.

In March 2015, the pier was put up for sale by then owners Cuerden Leisure, who reported that there was "strong interest" from investors in the £4.5m pier. It was one of three piers being sold by the company, the others being Central Pier, Blackpool and South Pier, Blackpool, although Llandudno Pier was attracting the strongest interest. The pier was purchased in May 2015 by leisure entrepreneur Adam Williams for the £4.5m asking price and his company Tir Prince Leisure Group, after having attracted a large amount of interest.

=== 21st century ===
The June 2007 sailings of the MV Balmoral were rescheduled to start at Menai Bridge Pier, after it emerged that the landing stage at Llandudno Pier was no longer safe to use. The landing stage was rebuilt in 2012 and the MV Balmoral called there on 2 July 2015, the first ship to land at the pier since 2006. The landing stage is no longer used for steamers but is used as a platform for anglers to fish off the end of the pier; it is not accessible to the general public.

The pier suffered heavy damage in December 2024 as a result of Storm Darragh.

== The Pier Pavilion ==
Until the Second World War, the public were charged admission to access the pier. Admission allowed the promenaders access to musical entertainment from a bandstand at the pierhead. A small orchestra was established in 1877. The notable French musician Jules Rivière was appointed to take charge of the orchestra in 1887.

The orchestral performances moved to the Pier Pavilion, built on land adjacent to the main entrance from the promenade, which opened in September 1886. Rivière's Orchestra at the Llandudno Pier Pavilion trebled in size to symphony proportions. The young Henry Wood came to Llandudno to observe the then elderly Rivière at work. The pavilion was destroyed by fire in 1994 and not rebuilt.

== Cultural references ==
Llandudno Pier is known to be chosen for Victorian and Edwardian seaside filming locations, such as the 2002 TV production of The Forsyte Saga. It also featured on a 2013 advert for Volkswagen. It is the setting of an episode in Arnold Bennett's 1911 comic novel The Card.

== Awards ==
- 2005 – National Piers Society – Pier of the Year
- 2025 – National Piers Society – Pier of the Year

Awards and achievements
Preceded by North Pier, Blackpool	National Piers Society; Pier of the Year; 2005	Succeeded by Worthing Pier
