= List of piers in the United Kingdom =

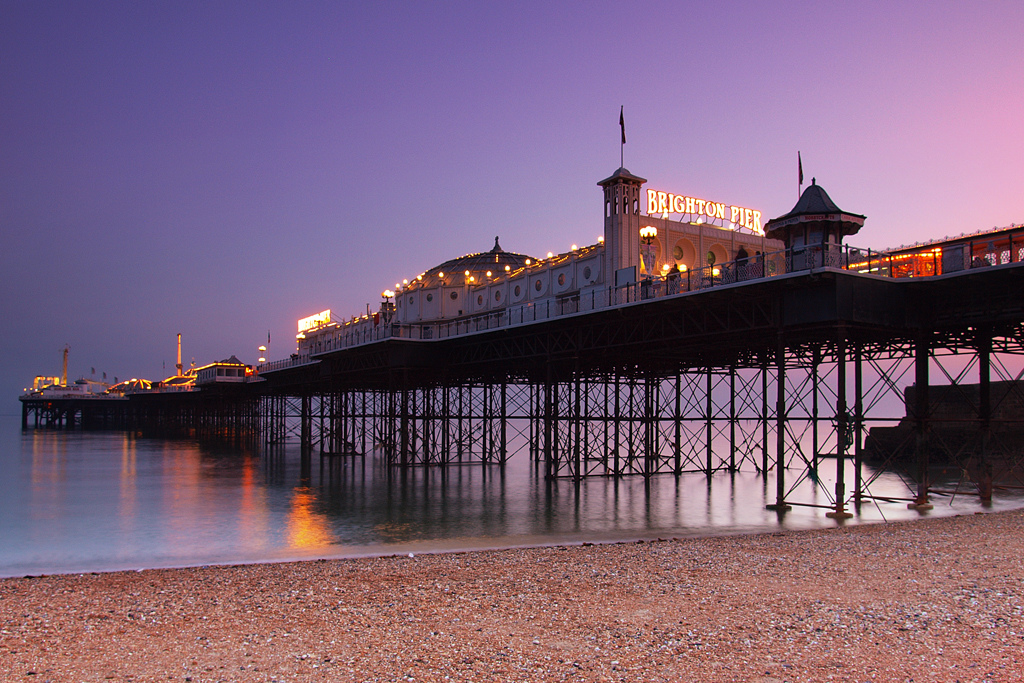
Brighton Palace Pier at dusk

This is a list of extant and former coastal piers in the United Kingdom and Isle of Man and piers on the river Thames.

== Coastal piers ==
=== England ===
Name	Place	Ceremonial county	Opened	Length	Pier of the Year	Listed grade	Description	Image
Central Pier	Blackpool	Lancashire	30 May 1868	1,118 feet (341 m)			Originally 1,518 feet (463 m) long.	
South Pier	Blackpool	Lancashire	31 March 1893	492 feet (150 m)			Contains a theme park.	
North Pier	Blackpool	Lancashire	21 May 1863	1,318 feet (402 m)	2004	II	Eugenius Birch's earliest surviving pier. Originally 1,410 feet (430 m) long.	
Bognor Regis Pier	Bognor Regis	West Sussex	5 May 1865	350 feet (110 m)				
Bournemouth Pier	Bournemouth	Dorset	17 September 1861	1,000 feet (300 m)			Zip wire installed in 2014, spanning between the pierhead and the beach. Original pier consisted of a wooden jetty opened in 1856.	
Boscombe Pier	Bournemouth	Dorset	29 July 1889	720 feet (220 m)	2010			
Palace Pier	Brighton	East Sussex	20 May 1899	1,722 feet (525 m)	1998	II*		
Burnham-on-Sea Pier	Burnham-on-Sea	Somerset	1858	90 feet (27 m)			Claims to be Britain's shortest pier. It is not recognised by most authorities as it is simply a beach pavilion.	
Clacton Pier	Clacton-on-Sea	Essex	27 July 1871	1,180 feet (360 m)	2020	II		
Cleethorpes Pier	Cleethorpes	Lincolnshire	4 August 1873	335 feet (102 m)	2016			
Clevedon Pier	Clevedon	Somerset	29 March 1869	1,020 feet (310 m)	1999, 2013, 2021	I		
Cromer Pier	Cromer	Norfolk	8 June 1901	495 feet (151 m)	2000, 2015	II		
Deal Pier	Deal	Kent	19 November 1957	1,026 feet (313 m)	2008		One of the last pleasure piers to be built in the UK. Pre-dated by two original piers, built in 1838 and 1864.	
Eastbourne Pier	Eastbourne	East Sussex	13 June 1870	1,000 feet (300 m)	1997	II*		
Prince of Wales Pier	Falmouth	Cornwall	5 May 1905					
Felixstowe Pier	Felixstowe	Suffolk	August 1905	450 feet (140 m)			Major redevelopments in 2017, involving construction of a new amusement building. There are currently no plans to re-open the seaward end.	
Folkestone Harbour Arm	Folkestone	Kent	1904	1,600 feet (490 m)		II (lighthouse)	First used from 1904 as a port pier for ferries to Boulogne, France. Re-opened in 2016. Used as a pleasure pier, and for fishing.	
Gravesend Town	Gravesend	Kent	1834	172 feet (52 m)		II*	On the Thames, and not a seaside pier recognised by most authorities.	
Royal Terrace	Gravesend	Kent	1844				On the Thames. Not recognised as a seaside pier by most authorities.	
Britannia Pier	Great Yarmouth	Norfolk	13 July 1858	810 feet (250 m)				
Wellington Pier	Great Yarmouth	Norfolk	31 October 1853	700 feet (210 m)				
Ha'penny Pier	Harwich	Essex	July 1853				Not a seaside pier recognised by most authorities.	
Hastings Pier	Hastings	East Sussex	5 August 1872	912 feet (278 m)	2017		Pier of the Year following extensive restoration.	
Herne Bay Pier	Herne Bay	Kent	1899				Majority of pier destroyed in a storm in 1978. The shoreward section is still open, and the pier head remains isolated 1 km (0.6 mi) into the sea.	
Hythe Pier	Hythe	Hampshire	1 January 1881	2,100 feet (640 m)		II	Oldest continually running pier train in the world.	
Claremont Pier	Lowestoft	Suffolk	1903	600 feet (180 m)			Pier decking not open for public use.	
South Pier	Lowestoft	Suffolk	1846	1,320 feet (400 m)				
St Annes Pier	Lytham St Annes	Lancashire	15 June 1885	600 feet (180 m)		II		
Paignton Pier	Paignton	Devon	June 1879	780 feet (240 m)				
Ryde Pier	Ryde	Isle of Wight	26 July 1814	2,234 feet (681 m)		II	The UK's oldest pleasure pier. Island Line runs along entire length.	
Saltburn Pier	Saltburn-by-the-Sea	North Yorkshire	May 1869	681 feet (208 m)	2009	II*		
Sandown Pier	Sandown	Isle of Wight	29 May 1878	870 feet (270 m)				
Skegness Pier	Skegness	Lincolnshire	4 June 1881	387 feet (118 m)			Seaward section destroyed in a 1978 storm.	
Royal Pier	Southampton	Hampshire	8 July 1833	900 feet (270 m)		II	Closed 1980. Currently in very poor condition. Now classified as a Lost Pier.	
Southend Pier	Southend-on-Sea	Essex	1830	6,900 feet (2,100 m)	2007	II	The longest pleasure pier in the world, extending 2.1 kilometres (1.3 mi) into the Thames Estuary.	
Southport Pier	Southport	Merseyside	2 August 1860	3,536 feet (1,078 m)	2003	II		
South Parade Pier	Southsea	Hampshire	26 July 1879	600 feet (180 m)			Re-opened 2017.	
Clarence Pier	Southsea	Hampshire	1861	203 feet (62 m)			Three times wider than it is long, going along the beach rather than out to sea. The full pier is an amusement park.	
Southwold Pier	Southwold	Suffolk	1900	623 feet (190 m)	2002		Includes a collection of modern coin-operated novelty machines.	
Swanage Pier	Swanage	Dorset	29 March 1897	643 feet (196 m)	2012			
Grand Pier	Teignmouth	Devon	1867	696 feet (212 m)				
Princess Pier	Torquay	Devon	1890					
Totland Pier	Totland Bay	Isle of Wight	1880					
Walton Pier	Walton-on-the-Naze	Essex	1871	2,610 feet (800 m)			Originally built to a length of 530 feet (160 m) in 1871. The pier was extended and re-opened in August 1898.	
Grand Pier	Weston-super-Mare	Somerset	11 June 1904	1,201 feet (366 m)	2011			
Birnbeck Pier	Weston-super-Mare	Somerset	5 June 1867	1,150 feet (350 m)		II*	Closed since 1994. One of the few surviving Eugenius Birch piers. Restoration underway.	
Weymouth Pier	Weymouth	Dorset	1860	787 feet (240 m)			Weymouth Stone Pier is a breakwater. Weymouth Pleasure pier is described as a "man-made peninsula".	
Worthing Pier	Worthing	West Sussex	12 April 1862	960 feet (290 m)	2006, 2019	II		
Yarmouth Pier	Yarmouth	Isle of Wight	1876	1690 feet (440)				

=== Scotland ===
Name	Place	Opened	Length	Pier of the Year	Listed grade	Description	Image
Dunoon Pier	Dunoon	1889	370 feet (110 m)			Not recognised a seaside pier by most authorities. Built as a working pier rather than a pleasure pier.	
Helensburgh Pier	Helensburgh	1860	804 feet (245 m)			Not recognised a seaside pier by most authorities. Category C listed structure. Closed to marine traffic since October 2018.	Helensburgh Pier
Kilcreggan Pier	Kilcreggan		279 feet (85 m)			Not recognised a seaside pier by most authorities. Passenger-only ferry to Gourock.	
Rothesay Pier	Rothesay		433 feet (132 m)			Not recognised as a seaside pier by most authorities. Serves as a ferry terminal and small marina rather than a pleasure pier.	
Fort William Pier	Fort William		1,538 feet (469 m)			Not recognised as a seaside pier by most authorities.	

=== Wales ===
Name	Place	Opened	Length	Pier of the Year	Listed grade	Description	Image
Royal Pier	Aberystwyth	1865	794 feet (242 m)				
Garth Pier	Bangor	14 May 1896	1,510 feet (460 m)	2022	II*	Reopened in 1988.	
Beaumaris Pier	Beaumaris	1846	570 feet (170 m)			Refurbished 2011–2012.	
Llandudno Pier	Llandudno	1 August 1877	2,295 feet (700 m)	2005,2025	II*		
Mumbles Pier	Mumbles, Swansea	10 May 1898	835 feet (255 m)		II		
Penarth Pier	Penarth	February 1895	650 feet (200 m)	2014	II		

=== Isle of Man ===
Name	Place	Opened	Length	Pier of the Year	Listed grade	Description	Image
Queen's Pier	Ramsey, Isle of Man	22 July 1886	2,241 feet (683 m)			Closed June 1990; restoration started 2016; first three bays reopened July 2021.	

== Piers in London on the River Thames ==
- Bankside Pier
- Barrier Gardens Pier
- Blackfriars Millennium Pier
- Canary Wharf Pier
- Festival Pier
- Greenland Pier
- Greenwich Pier
- Hilton Docklands Nelson Dock Pier
- Kew Pier
- London Bridge City Pier
- London Eye Pier
- Masthouse Terrace Pier
- Millbank Millennium Pier
- North Greenwich Pier
- Putney Pier
- Savoy Pier
- Tower Bridge Quay
- Tower Lifeboat Station
- Tower Millennium Pier
- Westminster Millennium Pier
- Woolwich Arsenal Pier

== Former piers ==
Name	Place	Opened	Length	Pier of the Year	Listed grade	Description	Image
Royal Suspension Chain Pier	Brighton	25 November 1823	1,134 feet (346 m)			Destroyed during a storm on 4 December 1896.	
West Pier	Brighton	6 October 1866	1,115 feet (340 m)		I	Closed in 1975 and subsequently fell into disrepair. Now classified as a lost pier.	
Coatham Pier	Coatham, Redcar	1873	1,800 feet (550 m)			Demolished 1899.	
Victoria Pier	Colwyn Bay	1 June 1900	750 feet (230 m)		II	Closed since 2008. Partial collapse in 2017, leading to the demolition of the seaward end.	
Victoria Pier	Cowes	1903				Dismantled 1965.	
Leith Trinity Chain	Edinburgh	14 August 1821	627 feet (191 m)			Effectively closed in the 1850s and described as "deserted and ruinous" then destroyed by a storm on 18 October 1898.	
Portobello Pier	Edinburgh	1871	1,250 feet (380 m)			Designed by Sir Thomas Bouch, engineer who also designed the infamous Tay Bridge. Demolished in 1917 after repairs to storm damage bankrupted the owner.	Portobello Pier
Fleetwood Pier	Fleetwood	16 May 1910	492 feet (150 m)			Destroyed by fire in 2008, hence a lost pier.	
Hunstanton Pier	Hunstanton	1870	830 feet (250 m)			Partially destroyed by fire in 1939 before being mostly destroyed by a storm in 1978	
Lee-on-Solent Pier	Lee-on-the-Solent	1888	750 feet (230 m)			Demolished in 1958.	
Lytham Pier	Lytham	17 April 1865	914 feet (279 m)			Closed to the public before World War II following a period of decline. Demolished in 1960 despite protests from thousands of local residents.	
Margate Jetty	Margate	1824	1,100 feet (340 m)			Destroyed during 1978 North Sea storm surge on 11–12 January 1978.	
Central Pier	Morecambe	25 March 1869	912 feet (278 m)			Demolished 1992.	
West End Pier	Morecambe	1896	1,800 feet (550 m)			Demolished 1978.	
New Brighton Pier	New Brighton	1867	600 feet (180 m)			Demolished 1978.	
Plymouth Pier	Plymouth Hoe	1883	465 feet (142 m)			Wrecked by enemy bombing in 1941. Demolished in 1952.	
Aberavon Pier	Port Talbot	1898	900 feet (270 m)			Owned by British Transport Commission after being lost in 1962. Now a breakwater.	
Redcar Pier	Redcar	2 June 1873	1,300 feet (400 m)			Closed and demolished in 1980.	
Rhos-on-Sea Pier	Rhos-on-Sea, North Wales	1895	1,300 feet (400 m)			Lost in 1954.	
Rhyl Pier	Rhyl	19 August 1867	2,355 feet (718 m)			Demolished in 1973.	
Victoria Pier	Ryde	1854				Washed away in 1859. Replacement of 1864 storm damaged and demolished in 1924.	
Scarborough North Pier	Scarborough	1868	1,000 feet (300 m)			Lost in 1905.	
Seaview Chain Pier	Seaview, Isle of Wight	1881	1,050 feet (320 m)			Demolished in 1952 after storm damage.	
Shanklin Pier	Shanklin	1890	1,200 feet (370 m)			Demolished in February 1993.	
Southbourne Pier	Southbourne	1888	300 feet (91 m)			Demolished in 1907.	
St Leonards Pier	St Leonards-on-Sea	1891	950 feet (290 m)			Damaged by bombing, gales and fire during WW2. Demolished 1951–55.	
Ventnor Royal Victoria Pier	Ventnor	1877	650 feet (200 m)			Four piers built on same site. Last one demolished in 1993.	
Royal Victoria Pier	Tenby	1899	330 feet (100 m)			Constructed as 230 feet (70 m) structure and later extended. Lost in 1953.	
Weymouth Pier Bandstand	Weymouth	25 May 1939	200 feet (61 m)			Majority of pier demolished in 1986; only the entrance building remains on 48 feet (15 m) of the pier. Thus not a seaside pier any longer.	
Withernsea Pier	Withernsea	August 1877	1,196 feet (365 m)			Partial destruction by storm in 1882 and ship collisions in 1890 and 1893. Last remaining section removed in 1903.	

== See also ==
- List of piers
- National Piers Society
