= South Pier =

South Pier may refer to:

- South Pier, Blackpool, a pier in Blackpool, England
- South Pier, Lowestoft, a pier in Lowestoft, Suffolk
- South Pier, Penzance, a pier in Penzance, Cornwall, England
- Charlevoix South Pier Light Station, a lighthouse in Charlevoix, Michigan, U.S.
- Gorleston South Pier Lighthouse, a coastwatch station in Gorleston, England

== See also ==
- Marina South Pier, a pier in Marina South, Singapore
  - Marina South Pier MRT station, a proposed massive transit station at Marina South Pier
- South Parade Pier, in Portsmouth, England
