= Cyril Babbage =

British flying ace of WWII

- Born: 25 June 1917; Ludlow, Shropshire, England
- Died: 24 November 1976 (aged 59); Bath, Somerset, England
- Military career
- Allegiance: United Kingdom
- Branch: Royal Air Force
- Service years: 1939–1964
- Rank: Wing Commander
- Units: No. 602 Squadron; No. 41 Squadron; No. 464 Squadron
- Conflicts: Second World War: Battle of Britain; Circus offensive; Invasion of Normandy
- Awards: Distinguished Flying Medal

Cyril Babbage, DFM (25 June 1917 – 24 November 1976) was a British flying ace who served with the Royal Air Force (RAF) during the Second World War. He was credited with having shot down eight aircraft.

From Ludlow, Benson trained as a pilot in the Royal Air Force Volunteer Reserve from 1938. He was called up for service in the RAF on the outbreak of the Second World War in September 1939 and once his training was completed, was posted to No. 602 Squadron. Flying Supermarine Spitfire fighters, he achieved several aerial victories during the Battle of Britain. In 1941, he flew with No. 41 Squadron and in September was believed to be responsible for shooting down the Luftwaffe flying ace Walter Adolph. He later flew de Havilland Mosquito heavy fighters. Remaining in the RAF in the postwar period, he served until his retirement as wing commander in 1964. He died in 1976, aged 59.

== Early life ==
Cyril Frederick Babbage was born on 25 June 1917 in the Shropshire town of Ludlow in England. Once his education was completed, he worked in the Babbage family's butchery business. In October 1938, he joined the Royal Air Force Volunteer Reserve to train as a pilot.

== Second World War ==
On the outbreak of the Second World War in September 1939, Babbage was called up for service with the Royal Air Force (RAF) and commenced further training. He was posted to No. 602 Squadron the following year as a sergeant pilot. The squadron was based at Grangemouth, from where it conducted patrols with its Supermarine Spitfire fighters over the Firth of Forth.

=== Battle of Britain ===
In August, No. 602 Squadron moved to Westhampnett, in the south of England, as part of the Tangmere Wing. The squadron was regularly scrambled to try and intercept bombers prior to their crossing the English coastline but later in the campaign, when the Luftwaffe's focus shifted to London, more of the squadron's inceptions were achieved over England. Babbage destroyed a Junkers Ju 87 dive bomber over the airfield at the Royal Naval Air Station Ford on 18 August, what is now known as The Hardest Day. The following day, he shared in the destruction of a Junkers Ju 88 medium bomber over Tangmere. On 25 August, he shot down a Messerschmitt Bf 110 heavy fighter and a Dornier Do 17 medium bomber, both over Dorchester.

After an engagement on 26 August in which Babbage damaged a Messerschmitt Bf 109 fighter near Selsey Bill, he in turn was shot down by the Luftwaffe flying ace Hans-Karl Mayer. He bailed out over the English Channel, coming down near the West Sussex coast. He was collected by boat and returned to the Bognor Regis Pier. He was hospitalised for a day and returned to his squadron on 28 August, being personally collected by its commander, Squadron Leader A. Johnstone. On 11 September he destroyed a Bf 110 to the south of Selsey Bill and, despite his Spitfire being damaged in the engagement, returned safely to Westhampnett. On Battle of Britain Day, 15 September, he damaged a Do 17 over Beachy Head.

On 26 September Babbage shot down a Heinkel He 111 medium bomber over Southampton Water, one of several bombers targeting the Supermarine factory at Southampton. He destroyed a Ju 88 the following day in addition to the probable destruction of a Bf 109 in the vicinity of Dungeness. He was credited with a share in the probable destruction of a Ju 88 off Beachy Head on 12 October. Damaged as a result as return machine gun fire from the Ju 88, he had to make a forced landing near Lewes. Two days later he damaged a Bf 109 near Gravelines. He was duly recognised for his successes over the preceding weeks with an award of the Distinguished Flying Medal; Air Vice-marshal Keith Park, commanding officer of No. 11 Group, personally announced the award on a visit to the squadron. The citation, published in The London Gazette, read:

Sergeant Babbage has shown consistent keenness and ability in operations against the enemy. He has personally destroyed six enemy aircraft and probably one other.

— London Gazette, No. 34978, 25 October 1940

=== Later war service ===
Babbage was commissioned as a pilot officer on 1 December. Shortly afterwards, No. 602 Squadron ended its service in the south of England and shifted to Prestwick in Scotland. From here for the next few months, the squadron mostly carried out convoy patrols. After a period of rest from operations, in June 1941, Babbage was posted to No. 41 Squadron. His new unit was equipped with Spitfires and was engaged in Fighter Command's Circus offensive, carrying out sorties to German-occupied France as part of the Tangmere wing. On a bomber escort mission to Ostend, carried out on 18 September, Babbage engaged an aircraft that he described as being similar to a Curtiss Hawk 75 fighter. The aircraft was destroyed and Babbage saw it fall into the sea in pieces. It was subsequently discovered that this was the new Luftwaffe Focke Wulf 190 fighter and that the pilot shot down and killed was the flying ace Walter Adolph. Babbage was the first RAF pilot to destroy a Fw 190.

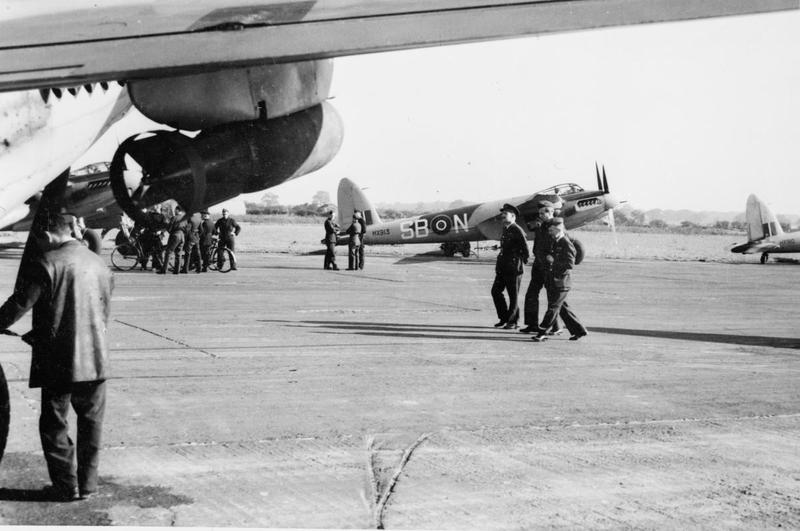
De Havilland Mosquitos of No. 464 Squadron at Hunsdon

Babbage was promoted to flying officer in December 1941. Later in the war, he flew de Havilland Mosquito heavy fighters with No. 464 Squadron, part of No. 140 Wing of the Second Tactical Air Force, carrying out nighttime intruder missions. He flew sorties in support of the invasion of Normandy, and was shot down twice while on operations with Mosquitos.

== Later life ==
Babbage remained in the RAF as a flight lieutenant after the war, having his service extended by four years. He was granted a permanent commission as a squadron leader in March 1949. His peacetime career involved instructing on the use of aircraft interception radar. Promoted to wing commander in July 1955, he retired from the RAF at that rank in June 1964. In his retirement he lived in Larkhall, Bath, where he died on 24 November 1976. His biography, written by Air Marshal G.A. 'Black' Robertson, was published by Grub Street in September 2025 as The Shy Assassin.

Babbage is credited with the destruction of eight aircraft, one of which was shared with other pilots. He also damaged two aircraft and is believed to have probably destroyed three others.
