= Walter Adolph =

German World War II fighter pilot (1913–1941)

- Adolph as a Hauptmann
- Born: 11 June 1913; Fântânele, Kingdom of Romania
- Died: 18 September 1941 (aged 28); North Sea, off Ostend, German-occupied Belgium
- Cause of death: Killed in action
- Burial place: Lommel, Belgium (Block 38-grave 459)
- Military career
- Allegiance: Nazi Germany
- Branch: Luftwaffe
- Service years: 193?–1941
- Rank: Hauptmann (captain)
- Units: J/88, JG 26
- Commands: II./JG 26
- Conflicts: See battles Spanish Civil War World War II: Invasion of Poland; Battle of France; Battle of Britain
- Awards: Spanish Cross in Gold with Swords; Knight's Cross of the Iron Cross

Walter Adolph (11 June 1913 – 18 September 1941) was a German Luftwaffe military aviator in the Spanish Civil War and a fighter ace during World War II. He is credited with 25 aerial victories, including one in Spain, achieved in 79 combat missions. All his World War II victories were claimed over the Western Front.

Born in Fântânele, Romania, Adolph served in the Condor Legion during the Spanish Civil War, where he claimed his first aerial victory on 30 December 1937. He was made Staffelkapitän (squadron leader) of 2. Staffel (2nd squadron) of Jagdgeschwader 1 (JG 1–1st Fighter Wing), a squadron which was later redesignated 8. Staffel of Jagdgeschwader 27 (JG 27–27th Fighter Wing). In October 1940, he was appointed Gruppenkommandeur (group commander) of II. Gruppe of Jagdgeschwader 26 "Schlageter" (JG 26–26th Fighter Wing) and received the Knight's Cross of the Iron Cross on 13 November 1940. On 16 September 1941, he was killed in action with Supermarine Spitfire fighters from No. 41 Squadron.

== Early life and career ==
Adolph was born on 11 June 1913 at Fântânele, Bacău County, Romania. After the fall of the Austro-Hungarian Empire in 1918, he moved with his family to Germany. From late 1937 until spring 1938, he served with 1. Staffel (1st squadron) of Jagdgruppe 88 (J/88–88th Fighter Group) of the Condor Legion during the Spanish Civil War. (Note: For an explanation of Luftwaffe unit designations see Organization of the Luftwaffe during World War II.) Adolph arrived in Spain at the time J/88 received a complement of 14 new Messerschmitt Bf 109 B-2 fighters. He claimed one victory, a Republican Polikarpov I-15 fighter, on 30 December 1937. He was awarded the Spanish Cross in Gold with Swords (Spanienkreuz in Gold mit Schwertern), for his service in the Spanish Civil War.

On 1 January 1939, Adolph was appointed Staffelkapitän (squadron leader) of 2. Staffel of Jagdgeschwader 130 (JG 130–130th Fighter Wing), a squadron of I. Gruppe (1st group) of JG 130 under the command of Hauptmann Bernhard Woldenga. This unit was renamed on 1 May 1939 and was then referred to 2. Staffel of Jagdgeschwader 1 (JG 1–1st Fighter Wing) from then on. In mid-August 1939, 2. Staffel was ordered to move from Jesau, near present-day Bagrationovsk, to Heiligenbeil, present-day Mamonovo, in preparation for the German Invasion of Poland.

== World War II ==
World War II in Europe began on Friday 1 September 1939 when German forces invaded Poland. On 6 September, I. Gruppe (1st group) of JG 1 was withdrawn and ordered to Lübeck-Blankensee and then on 15 September to Vörden where the unit stayed until January 1940. There, the Gruppe flew fighter protection during the "Phoney War" on the German border to the Netherlands. Adolph claimed his first aerial victory in World War II on 1 October 1939 over Osnabrück. His opponent was a Royal Air Force (RAF) Bristol Blenheim N6281 of No. 139 Squadron flown by F/O AC MacLachlan.

In mid-January 1940, I. Gruppe was ordered to an airfield at Gymnich, today part of Erftstadt, where the unit was tasked with patrolling Germany's western border. There, the Gruppe continuously conducted various flight exercises. In late April, the unit received the first Bf 109 E-4 variant, replacing the Bf 109 E-3s.

=== Battle of France and Britain ===
The Wehrmacht launched the invasion of France and the Low Countries on 10 May 1940. During this campaign, I. Gruppe of JG 1 was subordinated to the Stab (headquarters unit) of Jagdgeschwader 27 (JG 27–27th Fighter Wing) which was under the control of VIII. Fliegerkorps (8th Air Corps) under the command of Generaloberst Wolfram Freiherr von Richthofen. That day, I. Gruppe flew combat air patrols in the area of Venlo–Tirlemont–Liège and later that day to Maastricht. On 12 May, German forces began crossing the bridges over Meuse and Albert Canal. At first light, nine Bristol Blenheims belonging to No. 139 Squadron RAF took off from Plivot to bomb the bridgeheads. They ran into Bf 109s from Stab./JG 51, and 2. and 3./JG 27. In defense of these bridges, I. Gruppe claimed ten bombers shot down, including three Blenheim bombers from No. 139 Squadron by Adolph. No. 139 Squadron lost seven of the unescorted bombers. On 16 May, I. Gruppe was moved to an airfield at Charleville. On 6 June, Adolph was credited with two aerial victories over French Lioré et Olivier LeO 451 bombers in the vicinity of Montdidier, his fifth and last during the French campaign.

I. Gruppe moved to an airfield at Plumetot on 30 June 1940 for combat against the RAF. On 5 July, the Luftwaffe began reorganizing its fighter units. In consequence, I. Gruppe of JG 1 was officially integrated into JG 27 as its III. Gruppe, with 2. Staffel of JG 1 then becoming the 8. Staffel of JG 27. On 19 July, III. Gruppe escorted a number of Junkers Ju 87 dive bombers on a Kanalkampf mission to the Isle of Wight where they encountered a number of Hawker Hurricane fighters. The Gruppe claimed five Hurricanes shot down, including one by Adolph. The RAF attacked the Querqueville Airfield on the afternoon of 1 August. In defense of this attack, I. Gruppe claimed three aerial victories, including a Blenheim bomber shot down by Adolph near Cherbourg. On 7 September, the Luftwaffe launched Operation Loge, a 65-day air offensive against London. That day, Adolph claimed a Supermarine Spitfire destroyed south of Stanford.

=== Group commander and death ===
Adolph was appointed Gruppenkommandeur (group commander) of II. Gruppe of Jagdgeschwader 26 "Schlageter" (JG 26–26th Fighter Wing) on 4 October 1940. JG 26 was named after Albert Leo Schlageter, a martyr cultivated by the Nazi Party. On 11 October, Adolph claimed his tenth and eleventh aerial victory over two Spitfire fighters. Both Spitfires came from No. 41 Squadron and were shot down off the coast of Kent near Maidstone. Four days later, he claimed a Hurricane destroyed near London. The Hurricane either belonged to No. 46 Squadron or No. 501 Squadron. His 13th victory, a No. 603 Squadron Spitfire, was claimed on 25 October in aerial combat near Maidstone. Adolph's victim, Pilot Officer Ludwig Martel, flying P7350, lost consciousness and when he came around found he was flying upside down with a dead engine and promptly parachuted to safety.

His next victory was claimed on 1 November over a No. 74 Squadron Spitfire, also shot down near Maidstone. On 8 November, Adolph was credited with his 15th aerial victory, a Spitfire claimed near Tonbridge. That day, II. Gruppe had claimed four Spitfires shot down while British records show that two Hurricanes were lost while further two had to make a forced landing. On 13 November 1940, Adolph was awarded the Knight's Cross of the Iron Cross (Ritterkreuz des Eisernen Kreuzes) in parts for increasing the combat performance of II. Gruppe.

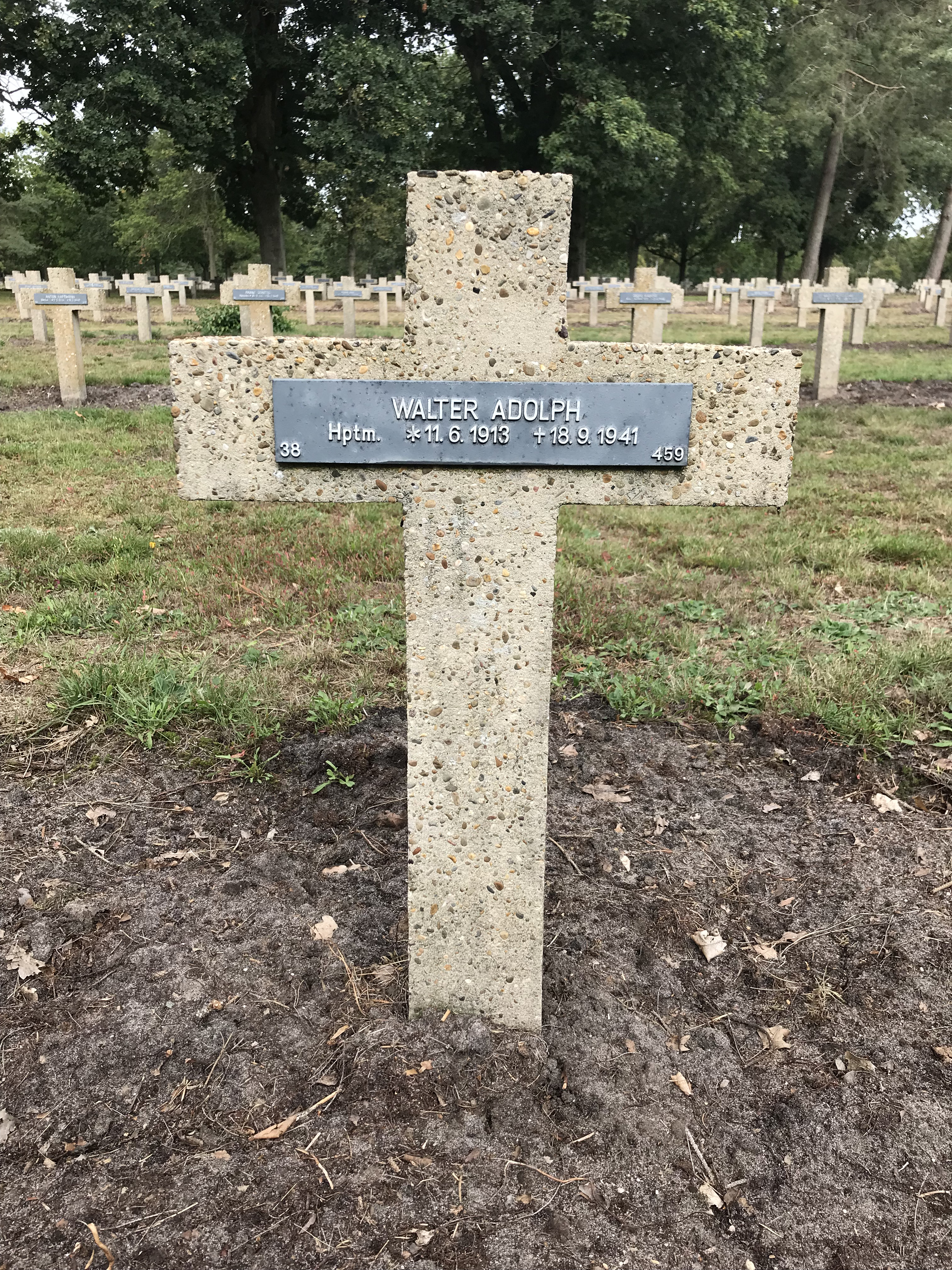
Lommel German war cemetery – Walter Adolph

On 17 June, the RAF flew "Circus" No. 13 targeting the Etabs Kuhlmann Chemical Works and power station at Chocques. In total, No. 2 Group sent 24 Blenheim bombers, escorted by fighters from North Weald and Biggin Hill. JG 26 claimed 15 aerial victories including a Hurricane by Adolph. (Note: According to Caldwell, this was "Circus" No. 14.) The RAF flew "Circus" No. 24 on 26 June with the objective to bomb the electrical power station at Comines with 28 bombers. Adolph claimed his 18th aerial victory that day, shooting down a Spitfire. On 1 July, II. Gruppe began relocating to Moorsele Airfield where the unit was closer to the RAF "Circus" routes. The infrastructure at Moorsele was ideal for the planned transition to the then new Focke-Wulf Fw 190 fighter aircraft which began arriving in July. On 6 July, the RAF flew another "Circus". No. 35 targeted Lille and the Fives-Lille engineering company. In defense of this attack, Adolph shot down a Spitfire from No. 74 Squadron. On 23 July, JG 26 claimed four Blenheim bombers shot down from No. 21 Squadron off the Scheldt Estuary and Ostend, including Adolph's 21st aerial victory. On 16 August, Adolph claimed aerial victories numbering 23 and 24 of World War II while defending against "Circus" No. 75. That day, he shot down a No. 602 Squadron Spitfire 20 kilometres (12 miles) northwest of Boulogne and a No. 602 Squadron 8 km (5.0 mi) north of Marquise.

On 18 September 1941, elements of JG 26 escorted a German tanker through the English Channel. The tanker came under attack by three Blenheim bombers just off the coast near Blankenberge. The bombers were escorted by Spitfire fighters from No. 41 Squadron and Hurricane fighters from No. 615 Squadron. Adolph headed a flight of eight Fw 190 from II. Gruppe in defense of the tanker. Following the attack on the tanker, one Blenheim bomber was claimed shot down by a German pilot. Adolph, while observing the crashed bomber, was shot down and killed in his Fw 190 A-1 (Werknummer 0028—factory number) 30 km (19 mi) northwest of Ostend. The British flying ace F/O Cyril Babbage of No. 41 Squadron is believed to have shot down Adolph. Adolph's Fw 190 was the first of its kind to be lost in aerial combat. Adolph's successor as Gruppenkommandeur was Hauptmann Joachim Müncheberg who took command of II. Gruppe on 19 September. On 12 October 1941, his body was washed ashore near Knokke, Belgium and was interred at the Lommel German war cemetery.

== Summary of career ==
=== Aerial victory claims ===
Author Spick lists him with 28 aerial victories, claimed in 79 combat missions. That are three victories more than authors Obermaier, Caldwell, Prien, Stemmer, Rodeike and Bock attribute him with. Spick states that Adolph had a mission-to-claim ratio of 2.82. Mathews and Foreman, authors of Luftwaffe Aces — Biographies and Victory Claims, researched the German Federal Archives and found records for more than 21 aerial victory claims, plus four further unconfirmed claims. This number includes one claim during the Spanish Civil War and 20 on the Western Front of World War II.

Chronicle of aerial victories
This and the ? (question mark) indicates information discrepancies listed by Prien, Stemmer, Rodeike, Bock, Mathews and Foreman.
| Claim | Date | Time | Type | Location | Claim | Date | Time | Type | Location |
Spanish Civil War
– 1. Staffel of Jagdgruppe 88 – Spanish Civil War — January 1937 – January 1938
| 1 | 30 December 1937 | — | I-15 | | | | | | |
World War II
– 2. Staffel of Jagdgeschwader 1 – "Phoney War" — 1 September 1939 – 9 May 1940
| 1 | 1 October 1939 | 14:10 | Blenheim | Bad Driburg | | | | | |
– 2. Staffel of Jagdgeschwader 1 – Battle of France — 10 May – 25 June 1940
| 2 | 12 May 1940 | 06:00 | Blenheim | vicinity of Maastricht | 5? (Note: According to Mathews and Foreman this claim is unconfirmed.) | 6 June 1940 | — | LeO 451 | Montdidier |
| 3 | 12 May 1940 | 06:07 | Blenheim | vicinity of Maastricht | 6? | 6 June 1940 | — | LeO 451 | Montdidier |
| 4 | 12 May 1940 | 10:37 | Blenheim | vicinity of Liège | | | | | |
– 8. Staffel of Jagdgeschwader 27 – Action at the Channel and over England — 26 June – 30 September 1940
| 7 | 19 July 1940 | 18:25 | Hurricane | off the Isle of Wight | 9 | 7 September 1940 | 18:25 | Spitfire | south of Stanford |
| 8 | 1 August 1940 | 16:45 | Blenheim | vicinity of Cherbourg | | | | | |
– Stab II. Gruppe of Jagdgeschwader 26 "Schlageter" – Action at the Channel and over England — 3 October – 21 June 1941
| 10 | 11 October 1940 | 17:38 | Spitfire | Maidstone | 14 | 1 November 1940 | 12:50 | Spitfire | Maidstone |
| 11 | 11 October 1940 | 17:38 | Spitfire | Maidstone | 15 | 8 November 1940 | 14:50 | Spitfire | Tonbridge |
| 12 | 15 October 1940 | 14:10 | Hurricane | London | 16 | 17 June 1941 | 19:50 | Hurricane | Boulogne |
| 13 | 25 October 1940 | 11:04 | Spitfire | Maidstone | | | | | |
– Stab II. Gruppe of Jagdgeschwader 26 "Schlageter" – Action at the Channel and over England — 22 June – 18 September 1941
| 17 | 22 June 1941 | 16:00 | Spitfire | Gravelines | 21 | 23 July 1941 | 14:20 | Blenheim | Ostend |
| 18 | 26 June 1941 | 11:55 | Spitfire | Mardyck | 22 | 24 July 1941 | 14:55? (Note: According to Mathews and Foreman claimed at 14:56.) | Spitfire | 20 km (12 mi) northwest of Gravelines |
| 19 | 6 July 1941 | 14:45? (Note: According to Mathews and Foreman claimed at 14:15.) | Spitfire | Wormhout vicinity of Calais | 23? | 16 August 1941 | 09:30? (Note: According to Mathews and Foreman claimed at 09:35.) | Spitfire | 20 km (12 mi) northwest of Boulogne |
| 20 | 8 July 1941 | 15:30 | Spitfire | Gravelines | 24? | 16 August 1941 | 19:30? (Note: According to Mathews and Foreman claimed at 19:45.) | Spitfire | 8 km (5.0 mi) north of Marquise |

=== Awards ===
- Spanish Cross in Gold with Swords
- Honour Goblet of the Luftwaffe (26 October 1940)
- Knight's Cross of the Iron Cross on 13 November 1940 as Hauptmann and Gruppenkommandeur of the II./Jagdgeschwader 26 "Schlageter"
