= C. G. Grey =

British journalist

Charles Grey Grey
- Born: 13 November 1875
- Died: 9 December 1953 (aged 78)
- Education: Erasmus Smith School; Crystal Palace School of Engineering
- Occupation(s): Aeronautical journalist and activist

Charles Grey Grey (13 November 1875 – 9 December 1953), was the founding editor of the British weekly The Aeroplane and the second editor of Jane's All the World's Aircraft. Among many honours, he became an honorary Companion of the Royal Aeronautical Society.

Grey was born on 13 November 1875 and educated at the Erasmus Smith School in Dublin and as an engineer at the Crystal Palace School of Engineering. Grey's first job was as a staff writer for The Autocar. His secondary role as the magazine's aviation specialist resulted in a commission from Iliffe and Sons, Ltd. to edit a penny weekly aviation paper called The Aero. In 1911, in partnership with E. V. (Victor) Sassoon, Grey founded The Aeroplane, remaining as editor of the influential weekly until November 1939. He was a man of decided opinions as evidenced in his editorials for the magazine over three decades. These included strong support for the fascist dictators of Italy and Germany, which played no small part in his leaving the magazine. Grey was a man of fascist sympathies and an ardent supporter of Hitler; in the 1930s he aired his antisemitic, anti-Bolshevist and pro-fascist opinions in his editorials.

After the Second World War, he continued to express extreme right-wing views. In 1949 he wrote, "If the Government had the will and the guts, to take the B.B.C. by the neck and make it stop singing, I'll walk beside you, to the Russians and the Juggos and the Czechs and the Poles and the Bulgars and the Viet Nams and the Indonesians and the Burmese and everything that is out on the Left Wing, and turn it over to doing a bit of walking British fashion, the R.A.F.'s troubles could be cured in 12 months ... Let the B.B.C. put on an R.A.F. band once in every programme every day to plug that fine swinging R.A.F. march as a signature tune, as they plug bastard negroid cacophonies from Tin Pan Alley. Let them put on an R.A.F. talk once a day on one programme or another. And let those talks be about action to-day and yesterday ... And see that those talks are produced by he-men."

Grey took over as editor of the annual issues of Jane's All the World's Aircraft from 1916 to 1940. After leaving The Aeroplane, Grey served from 1939 as air correspondent of the Yorkshire Evening Post and the Edinburgh Evening News, as well as various overseas journals. Grey also wrote a number of aviation books including A History of the Air Ministry (1940), The Luftwaffe (1944) and The Civil Air War (1945), the latter an opinionated review of likely post-war airline development and Britain's role in that process.

"Anyone who read C G in the 'twenties and 'thirties without having met him might have supposed his critical references, and sometimes perverse and acid comments reflected his nature and personality. Nothing could have been further from the truth. As long as we knew him he was a gentle and kindly man, always charming and generous to his friends, among whom he numbered rivals. Today there are men on Flight's staff who recall a kind word of encouragement here or a spot of advice there from the one-and-only C G, particularly when they were taking their first tentative steps in the hard and competitive world of journalism. His goodwill continued to be reflected in frequent correspondence. From the first to the last occasion upon which we talked to him, he never once failed to express either an original thought or to reveal an unexpected viewpoint on some current topic. Neither his writing nor his conversation was ever lacking in humour and regardless of one's age."

– Flight Magazine, 18 December 1953, published after Grey's death on 9 December 1953.
