= Crystal Palace School =

Former art school in London, England

Coordinates: 51.422°N 0.074°W

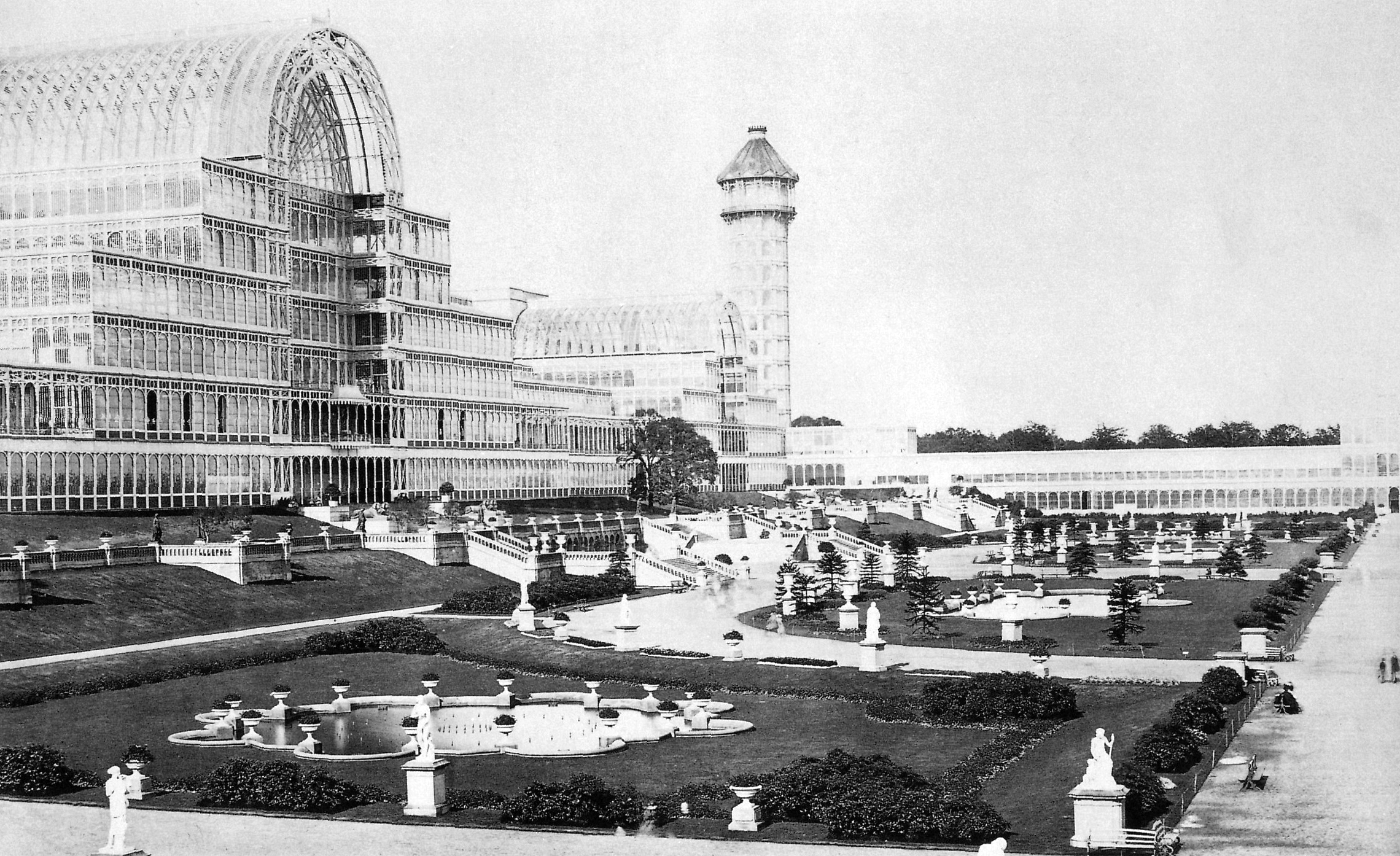
Sydenham 1854

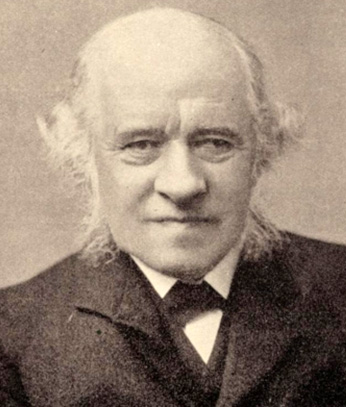
Sir George Grove in the 1890s

Crystal Palace School of Art, Science, and Literature, also known as Crystal Palace Company's School of Art, was opened in 1854 by the Crystal Palace Company as a new enterprise, to occupy part of the centrepiece building of the Great Exhibition, following its re-erection in suburban south-east London.

The civil engineer and later first director of the Royal College of Music, George Grove, was appointed secretary. (His sister Eleanor Grove also worked for women's education.) It was a part of the great movements for educational and social reform in nineteenth century Britain.

The main Crystal Palace buildings were destroyed by fire in 1936.

== Ladies' division ==
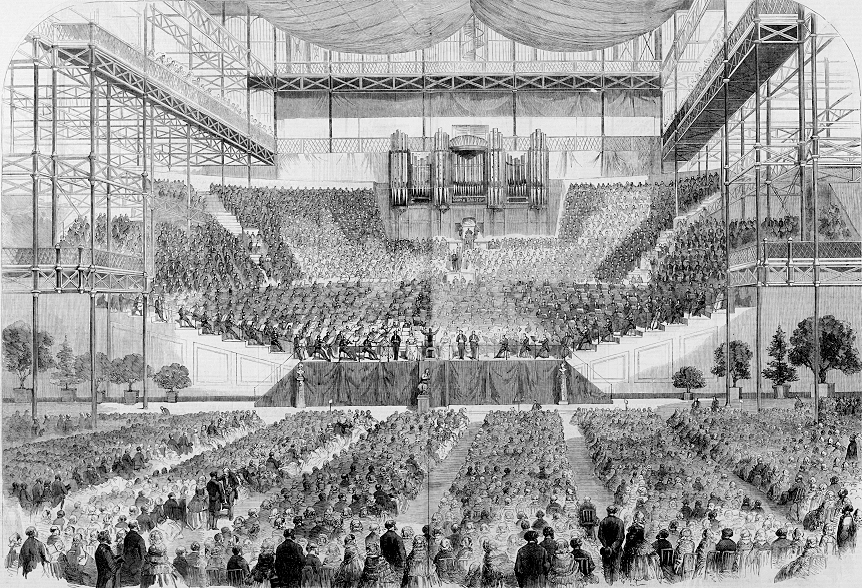
A Handel festival in the concert hall in 1857

The overwhelming majority of classes were for women:

- Music – later the Crystal Palace School of Music, 1880, Arthur Sullivan taught piano and singing and was a part-time Professor of Theory, Harmony and Transposition at the school in the 1860s and 1870s.
- Art – watercolours, sketching, figure drawing and modeling, painting in oils, later Crystal Palace School of Art
- English language and literature
- Literature of other nations especially French, German and Italian
- History – English, European and Biblical
- Sciences – zoology, botany, chemistry, physical geography, maths and arithmetic
- Woodcarving
- Dressmaking
- Cookery

=== Notable faculty ===
- Samuel Coleridge-Taylor
- August Manns
- Edward Milner
- Ebenezer Prout
- Harry Windsor–Fry
- Christopher Dresser

=== Notable students ===
==== Music students ====
- John Maughan Barnett
- Marion Margaret Scott

==== Art students ====
- Eleanor Fortescue-Brickdale
- René Jules Lalique

==== Literature students ====
- Mary Ann Harriet Margaret Hooper
- Jessie Laidlay Weston

==== Speech and drama students ====
- Elsie Fogerty

== Gentlemen's division ==
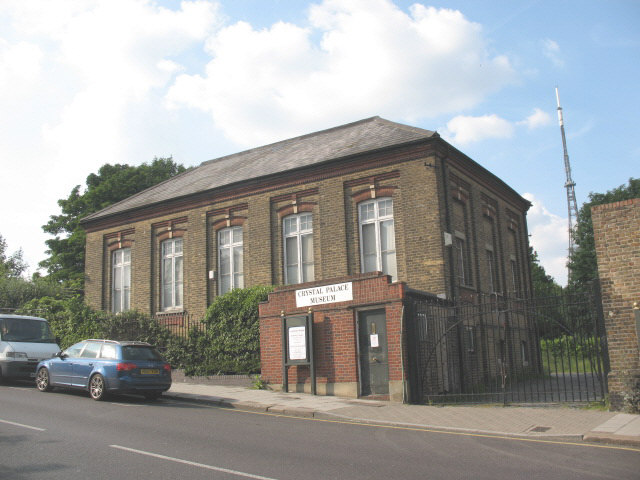
The Crystal Palace Museum Anerley Hill, Crystal Palace, London SE19. The South Tower base is just to the left.

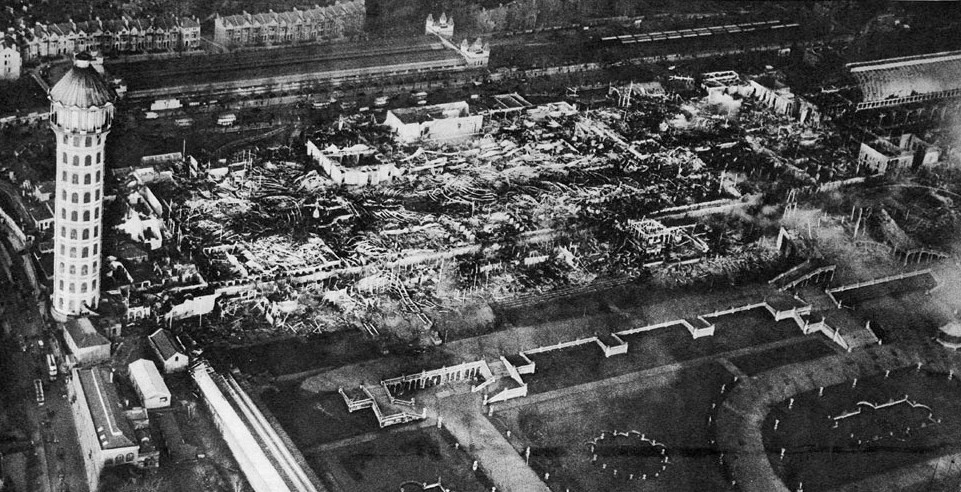
The South Tower after the fire; much of John Logie Baird's television equipment was destroyed.

Classes for gentlemen were limited to the School of Engineering, later Crystal Palace School of Engineering 1872. The South Tower was demolished in the early 1940s but a surviving part of the School of Engineering's premises is now the Crystal Palace Museum.

=== Notable engineering students ===
- William Beckett
- William Warwick Buckland
- Joseph Day
- George Furness
- René Jules Lalique
- Charles Grey
- Geoffrey de Havilland
- Reginald Walter Maudslay
- H. F. S. Morgan
- David McKee Wright

The South Tower also contained John Logie Baird's transmitter and studios.

The end of the Crystal Palace brings to mind memories of the School of Engineering which was housed in the South Tower, fortunately still standing firm as a rock. This school, founded by J. W. Wilson, M.I.M.E., an engineer who helped to build the Great Exhibition of 1851, sent many of its students to the four quarters of the globe. The curriculum of the school included mechanical and civil courses and about five of the circular rooms were used. There was a fitting shop, pattern shop, and drawing office. Those in the mechanical section built a 4 h.p. vertical engine which was generally exhibited at the head of the stairs on the south side of the Palace. In the Civil Engineering section we surveyed the whole of the grounds, and drew plans and made estimates for an imaginary railway which extended from one side to the other. This entailed all the necessary estimates for embankments, a cantilever bridge etc. Then there was the Colonial section presided over by a most congenial superintendent, who had no doubt seen much of a pioneer's life and infused his enthusiasm into those who belonged to his section. Concerning the rigidity of the South Tower, I was working in a high storey soon after joining the school when there was a strong wind, and, feeling giddy, I mentioned it to the superintendent. He informed me that it rocked several inches at the top, which made it safer than absolute rigidity.

Mr F. C. Bell, 74, Berners Street, Ipswich., Letter to The Editor, The Times, Monday Dec. 07, 1936. page 10, issue 47551

== Examinations ==
The school was a centre for the examinations of the Oxford and Cambridge syndicates.

== See also ==
- Polytechnic (United Kingdom)
