= Maughan Barnett =

Organist, choirmaster, pianist, composer, conductor

John Maughan Barnett (21 March 1867 – 31 July 1938) was a New Zealand organist, choirmaster, pianist, composer and conductor.

== Early life ==
He was born in Leamington, Warwickshire, England on 21 March 1867. He studied piano and composition at the Crystal Palace School in Sydenham, London.

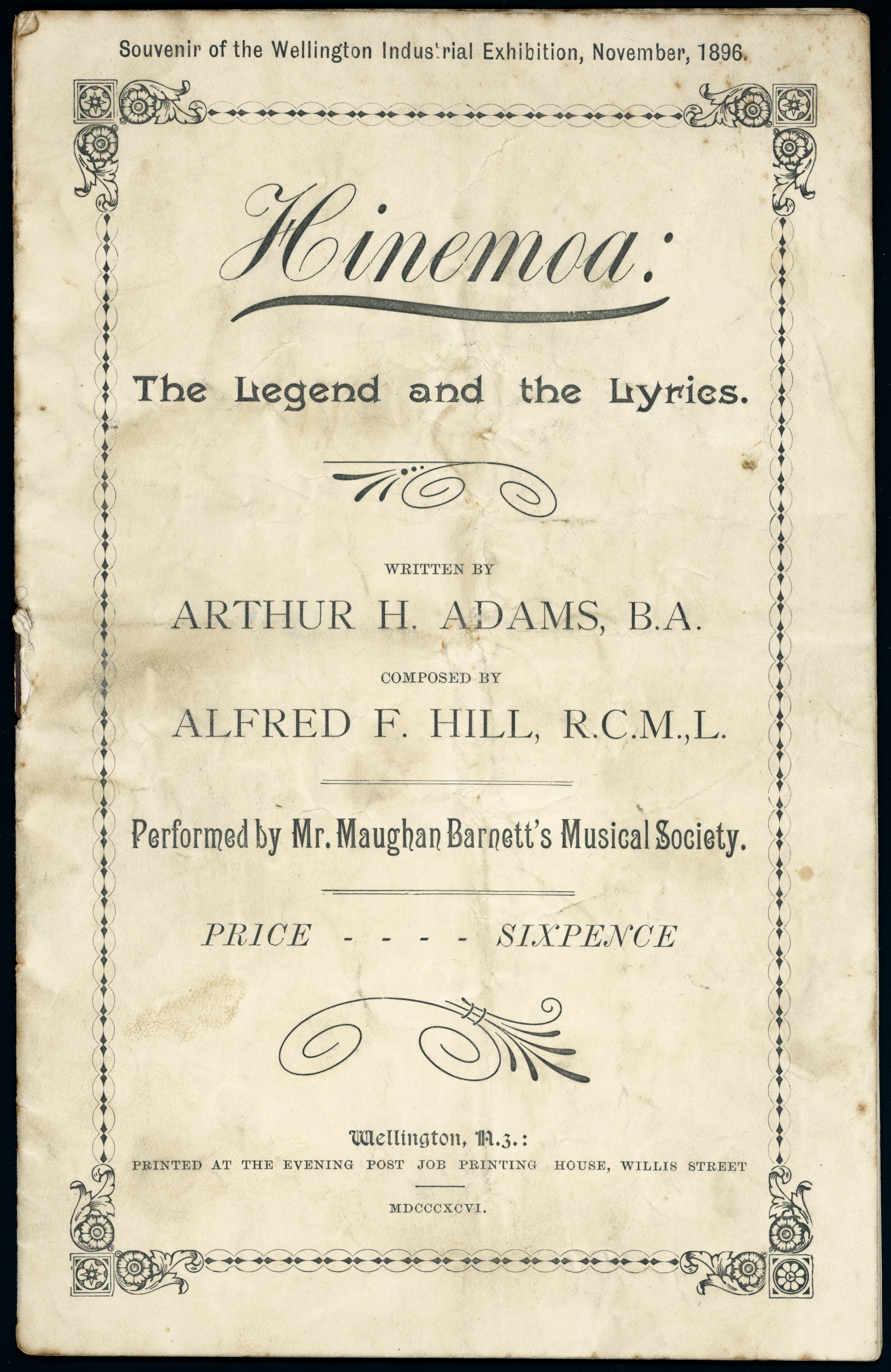
Booklet for Hinemoa performed by Barnett's Musical Society, November 1896

== Career ==
Barnett was organist and choirmaster at churches in Tunbridge Wells and St Leonards, Sussex. In 1890, for health reasons, he emigrated to Hobart, Tasmania. There he was organist and choirmaster at the cathedral, moving to the same position in Napier, New Zealand in 1893. In England, Tasmania and New Zealand he taught, composed and performed on the organ and piano.

From 1895 he was organist and choirmaster at St John's Church in Wellington, becoming city organist in 1908. He became Auckland city in organist in 1912 until he retired in 1932.

While in Wellington Barnett conducted the Wellington Choral Society and Orchestral Society. His Musical Society performed the cantata Hinemoa by Alfred Hill in November 1896 for the Wellington Industrial Exhibition.

== Personal life ==
Barnett married his first wife Harriett Frances Tugwell in 1889 in Tunbridge Wells. They had three daughters and one son. Their son, Lewin Maughan Barnett, was killed in World War I at Gallipoli. Harriett died in 1925 and Barnett was married again in 1935 to Mary Jameson. He died in Auckland in 1938.

== Selected works ==
=== Music ===
Barnett wrote compositions for piano and organ as well as other works including:

- Valse Caprice (1909) – for piano
- Concert Overture in E minor
- Ode to be sung at the opening of the Canterbury Jubilee Industrial Exhibition (1900)
- Ode to be sung at the laying of the foundation stone of the Town Hall, Wellington, by His Royal Highness the Duke of Cornwall and York (1901)
- Marching song (Auckland Provincial Expeditionary Force) (1914)
- Dilworth School Song (1924)

=== Book ===
- A Short Course of Pianoforte Technique (1904)
