= J. W. Wilson =

J. W. Wilson (Joseph William Wilson; 11 October 1829 – 5 November 1898) was an English engineer. He was a consulting engineer in the construction of piers, and founded the School of Practical Engineering at Crystal Palace School.

== Life ==
=== Early life and career ===
Wilson was born in Walthamstow, son of the Rev. William Wilson, vicar of Walthamstow. He was intended for the church, and was entered for Wadham College, Oxford; preferring a career in engineering, he was placed as a pupil with his cousin Charles Fox, of the firm Fox and Henderson. At the end of his pupilage he was an assistant at the firm, in charge of the machinery used for the preparation of timber in the construction of the Crystal Palace, the building housing the Great Exhibition of 1851.

=== Oldbury and Banbury ===
In 1852, in partnership with his brother-in-law Samuel H. F. Cox, Wilson established at Oldbury (now in West Midlands) the Oldbury Engineering Works. It employed 300 to 400 men, and made pumping engines and other machinery, including machinery for the goldfields of California.

For health reasons, he retired from the Oldbury works. He became a consulting engineer at the Timber Works in Banbury, Oxfordshire, and patented in 1855 a circular gouge and disc-paring tool for timber machinery, for which he received a medal from the Royal Society of Arts.

=== London ===
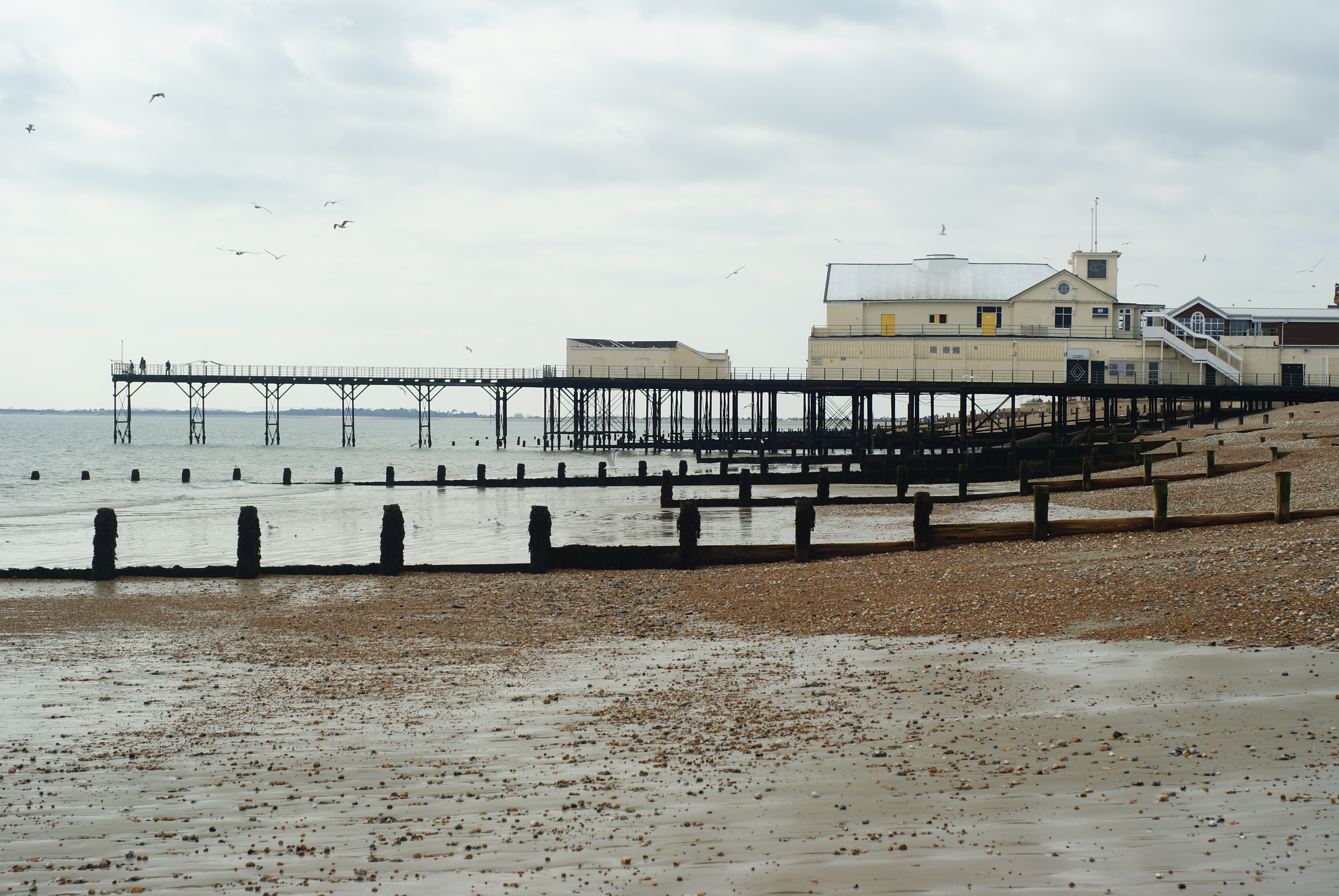
Bognor Regis Pier

In 1857 Wilson established himself as a consulting engineer in London, and was involved in the construction of piers including those at Teignmouth and Bognor Regis.

In 1872, with the support of George Grove, secretary of Crystal Palace School, he founded there the School of Practical Engineering, which combined theory and practice of engineering. Wilson was its principal for 26 years.

He was a member of the Institution of Mechanical Engineers, a member of the Institution of Civil Engineers and a fellow of the Royal Colonial Institute. Wilson died at his home in Kenley in 1898.

== Family ==
His son Joseph William Wilson (1851–1930) was co-founder and first vice-principal of the Crystal Palace School of Engineering, and succeeded his father as principal in 1898; his son Maurice Wilson (1862–1936) became principal in 1924.
