= Mary Hooper (19th-century author) =

English writer

Mary Ann Harriet Margaret Hooper (bapt. 24 November 1829 – 8 January 1904) was an English writer known particularly for her cookbooks, besides novels and children's books.

== Biography ==
Hooper was born in Leamington Spa, Warwickshire, to Fredrick William Hooper, an art dealer, and his wife Harriet. began her literary career as editor of the household section of Household Words, the mid-nineteenth century magazine edited by Charles Dickens; the Literary Collector praised her management of that section and its practical content and added a distinct character to the magazine. In the 1860s and 1870s, she started publishing her own cookbooks, including Papers on Cookery and Handbook for the Breakfast Table. She was invited to teach cooking classes at the Crystal Palace School of Arts, Science and Literature where eventually she became a professor of domestic economy.

She died in South Norwood, London, aged 74.

== Select bibliography ==
- Cookery for invalids: persons of delicate digestion, and for children. Henry S. King. 1876.
- Little dinners: how to serve them with elegance and economy. Henry S. King. 1874.
- Every Day Meals. Henry S. King. 1877.
- Good Plain Cookery. 1882.
- Handbook for the Breakfast Table 1873.
- Wives and Housewives: A Story for the Times 1875.
- Ways and Tricks of Animals 1880.
- Our Dog Prin 1880.
- Lily's Letters from the Farm 1880.
- Nelson's Home Comforts 1882.
- Hints on Cookery 1891.
- For Better For Worse (date unknown Cited in Handbook for the Breakfast Table 1873)
- Papers on Cookery (date unknown Cited in Handbook for the Breakfast Table 1873)
