= Totland Bay =

Bay on the Isle of Wight, England

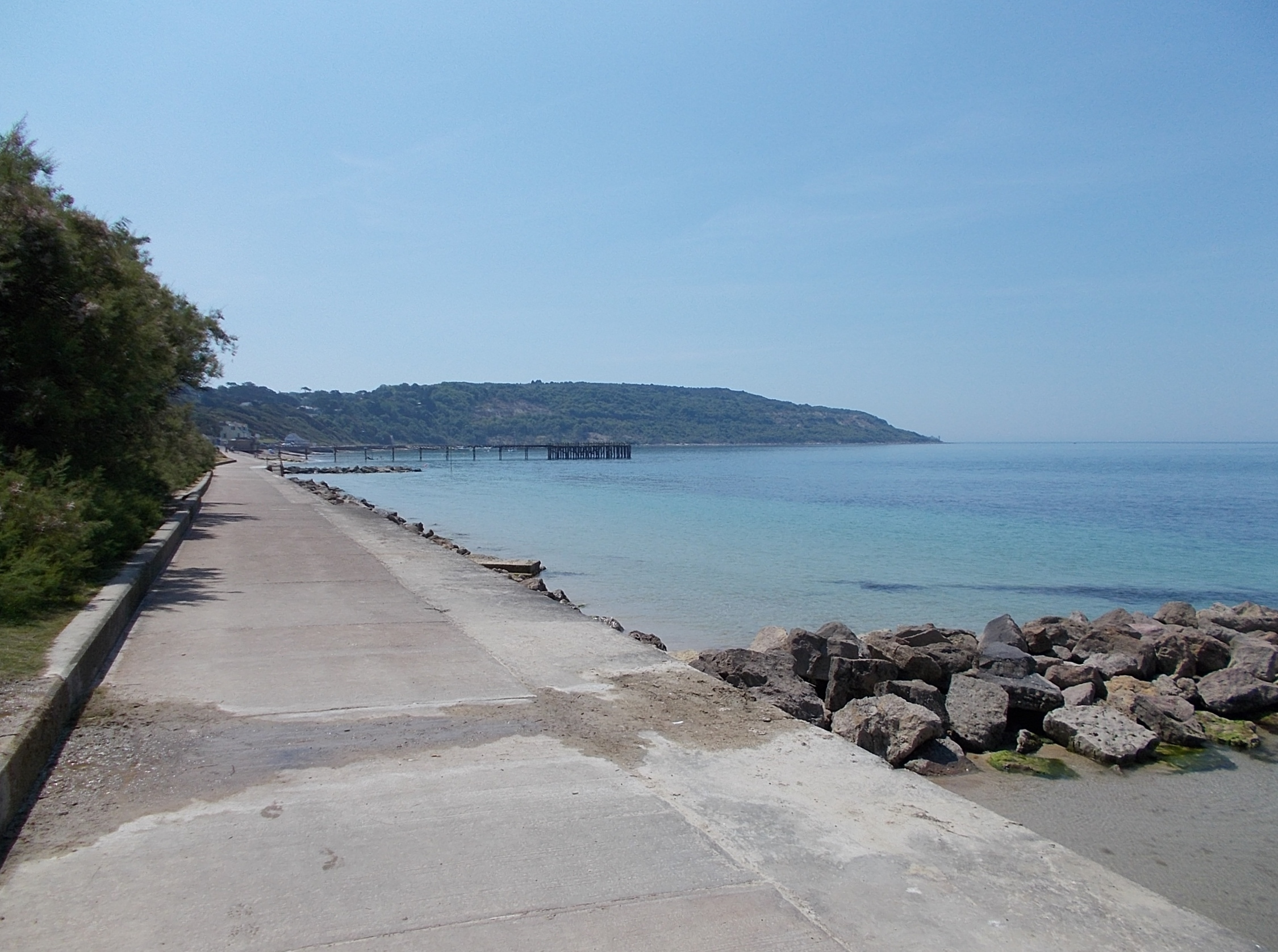
- Totland Bay, with Headon Warren behind (high ground in the distance)

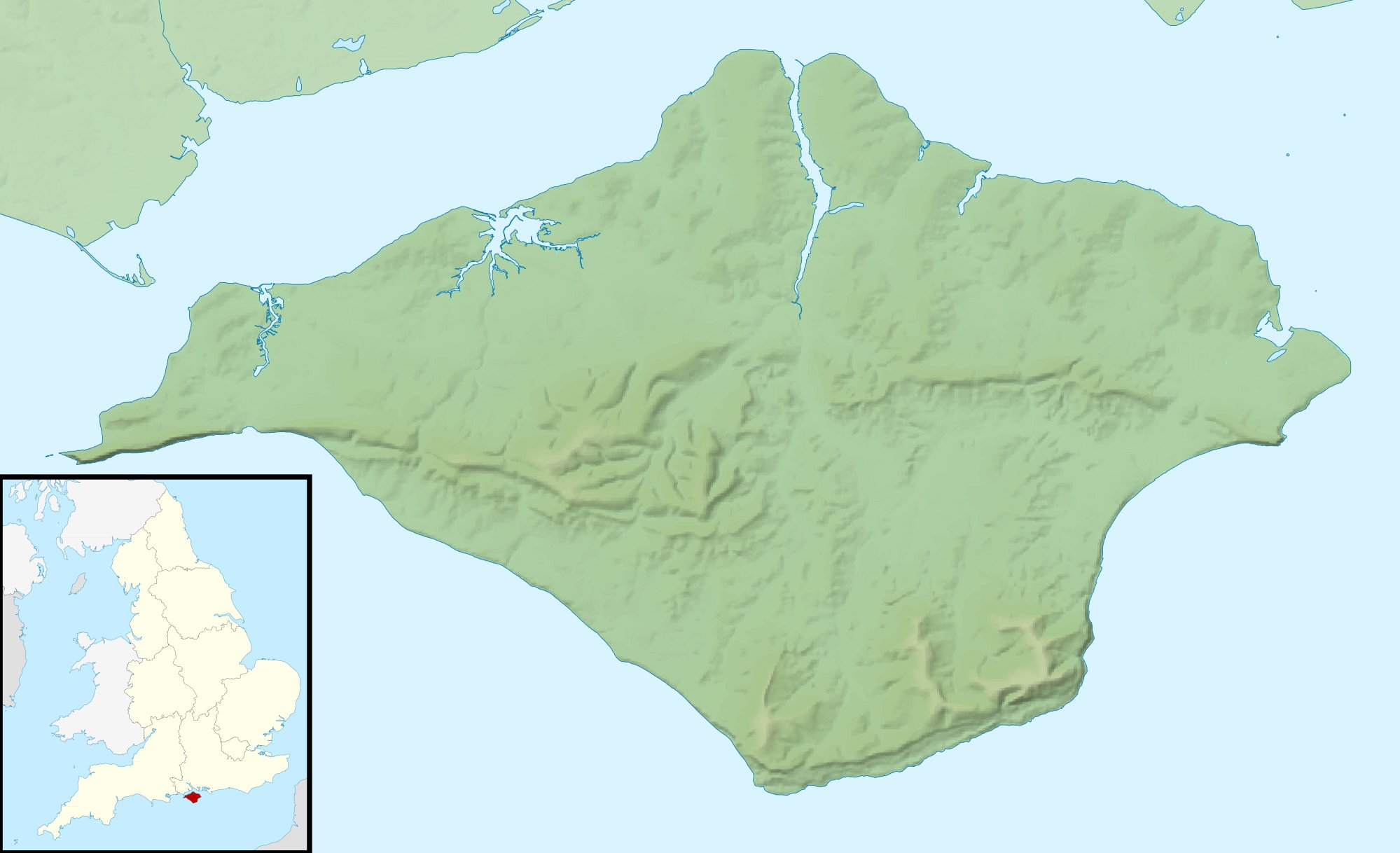
- Location within Isle of Wight
- Coordinates: 50.6800°N 1.5514°W
- Ocean/sea sources: English Channel

Totland Bay is a bay on the west coast of the Isle of Wight, England. It lies one-quarter of an mile (0.4 km) to the west of the village of Totland from which it takes its name. It faces north west and has a 2.5-mile-long (4.0 km) shoreline, which has a beach, concrete seawall, groynes and 450-foot-long (140 m) Victorian pier. It stretches from Warden Point in the north to Hatherwood Point in the south-west.

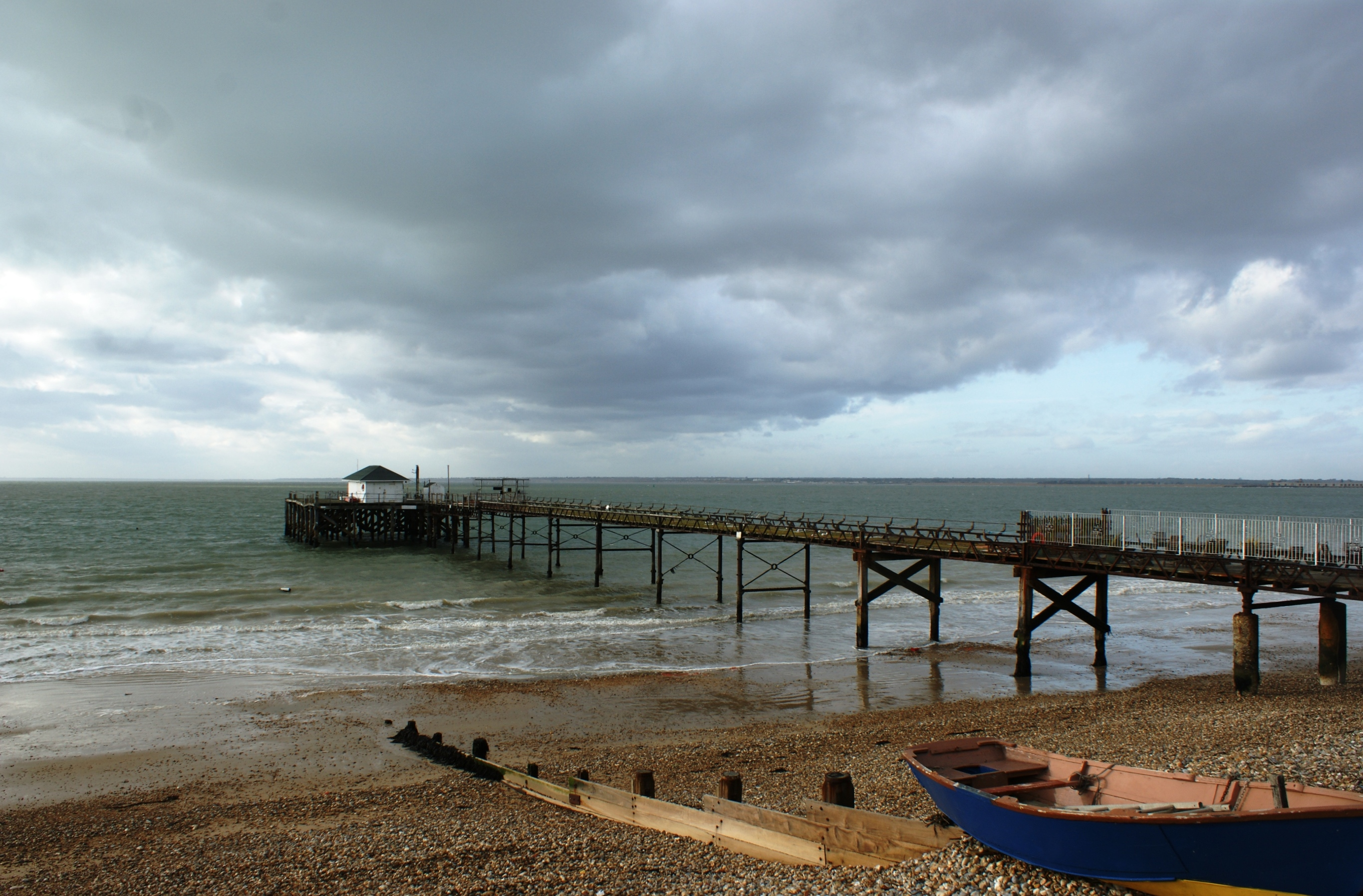
Totland Pier

The seabed is a mixture of mud and sand, clear of many underwater outcrops, this makes it a popular anchorage point for vessels. The beach is predominantly shingle. Since 2001 the quality of the beach has been high enough for it to be awarded the Seaside Award Flag. In the summer, litter and seaweed are removed each day, with the latter being composted by local farmers. Currently, the pier is being refurbished to re-open the cafe which was there before.

The bay is best viewed from Headon Warren or anywhere along the concrete seawall. The Isle of Wight Coastal Path runs along the seawall from Warden Point to Widdick Chine.

Between 1885 and 1924, Totland Bay Lifeboat Station operated in the area. Weston Academy, which closed in 2015 is located in the bay area.
