= Yarmouth Pier =

Coordinates: 50.7077°N 1.4995°W

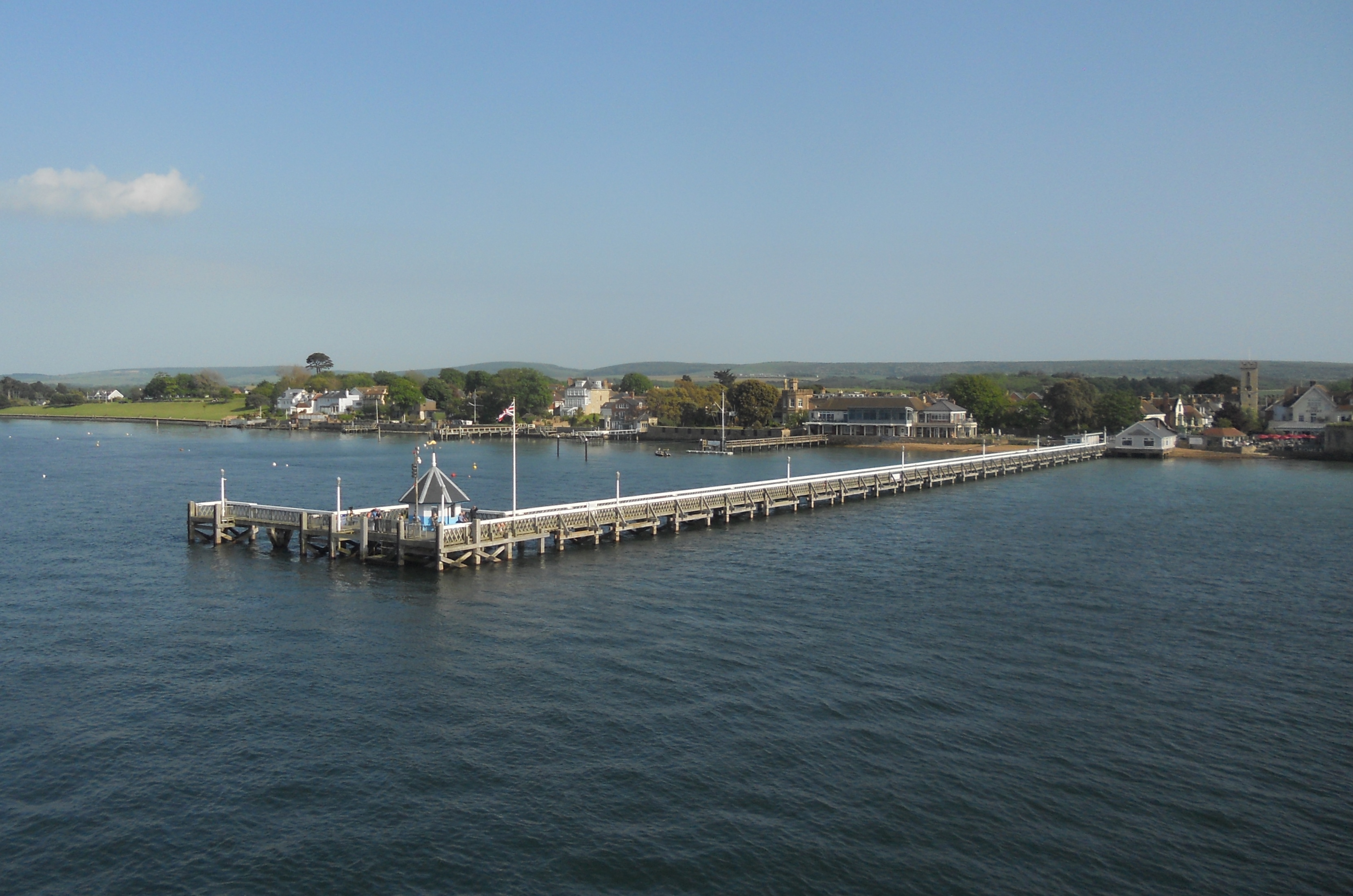

Characteristics
- Total length: 186 metres (610 ft)

History
- Opening date: 1876

Yarmouth Pier is a Victorian pleasure pier, located in Yarmouth, Isle of Wight. It is the longest wooden pier in England, and frequently requires restoration due to the relatively short lifespan of the wooden piles. Following its latest restoration scheme, it reopened to the public in 2008.

After 140 years of operation, it continues to thrive as a tourist attraction.

== See also ==
- List of piers in the United Kingdom
