= Grand Pier, Teignmouth =

Pier in Devon, England

Grand Pier
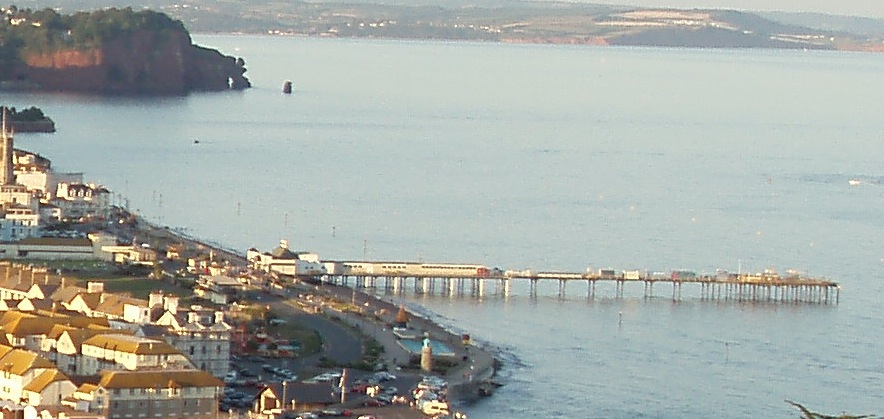
- Type: Pleasure Pier
- Coordinates: 50.5447°N 3.4942°W
- Official name: Grand Pier

Characteristics
- Total length: 212 metres (696 ft)

History
- Designer: J W Wilson
- Opening date: 1867

The Grand Pier, also known as Teignmouth Pier, is a pier in the town of Teignmouth, Devon, England, constructed between 1865 and 1867. It is 212 metres (696 ft) in length.

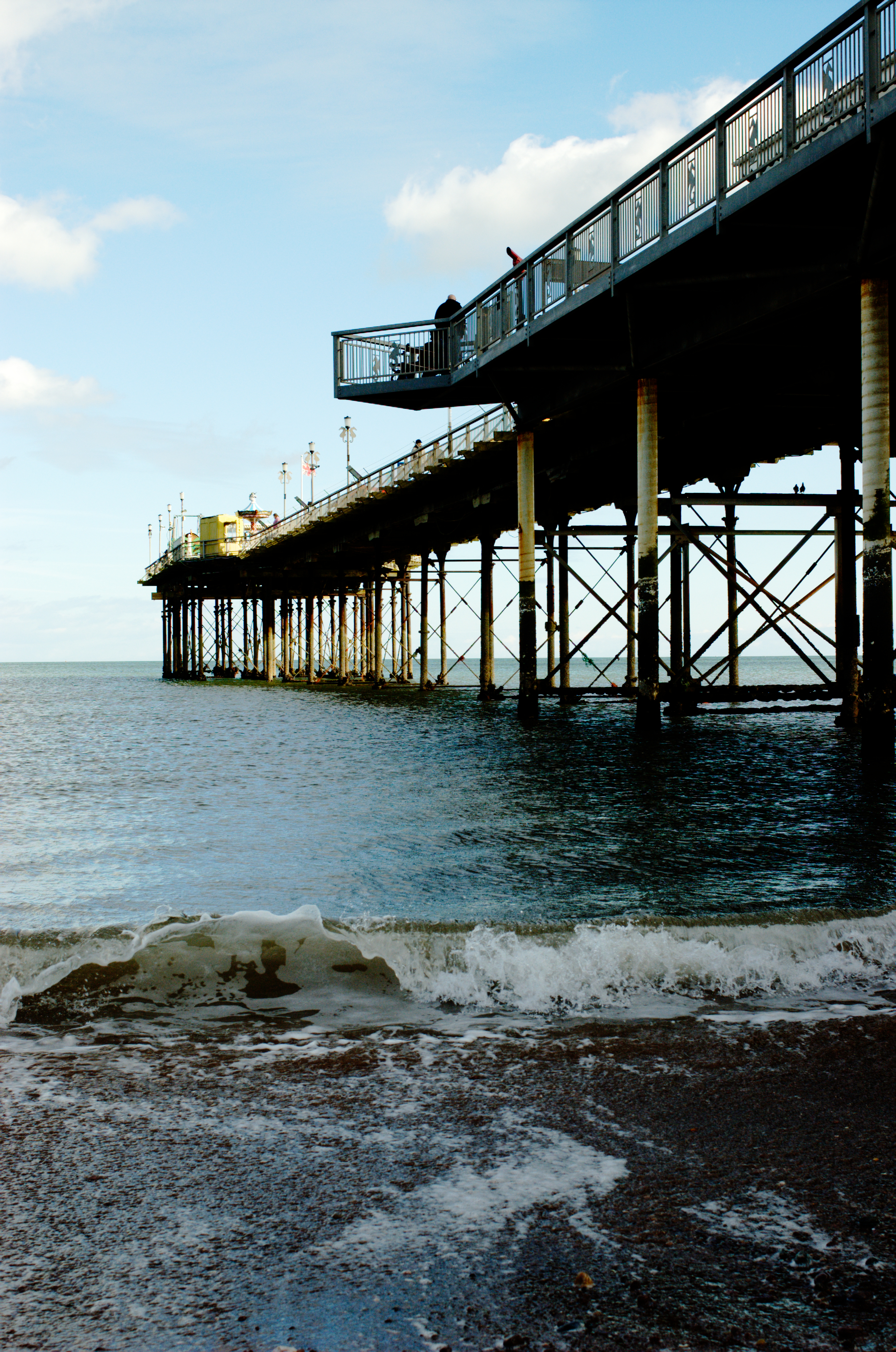
Teignmouth Pier seen from the beach

== History ==
A total of 89 piers were built in England and Wales between 1814 and 1910 of which only 50 remain. Teignmouth Pier was built in 1865 by Joseph Wilson, an engineering consultant from London.

Initially, the pier was a landing stage; its purpose was to enable steamboat passengers to get to the shore.

In March 1870, a petition to wind up the Teignmouth Pier Company Limited was published in The London Gazette.

The pier is constructed of cast-iron screw piles, screwed into the sand with a large hexagon on the pile. They are screwed down to the clay level. New steel piling has been driven 80 ft right to bedrock. The deck is open and made up of wood from the Yellow Balou, a hard wood from Borneo. The deck was only recently renewed.

During the Second World War, a 60–foot section of deck was removed so that the Germans could not use it to disembark if they invaded England. Nearly all the piers on the East and South coasts were dealt with in the same way. Compensation was paid out for replacement of that section but many remained in that state for a considerable period. The Grand was not returned to its original width until the early 1960s.

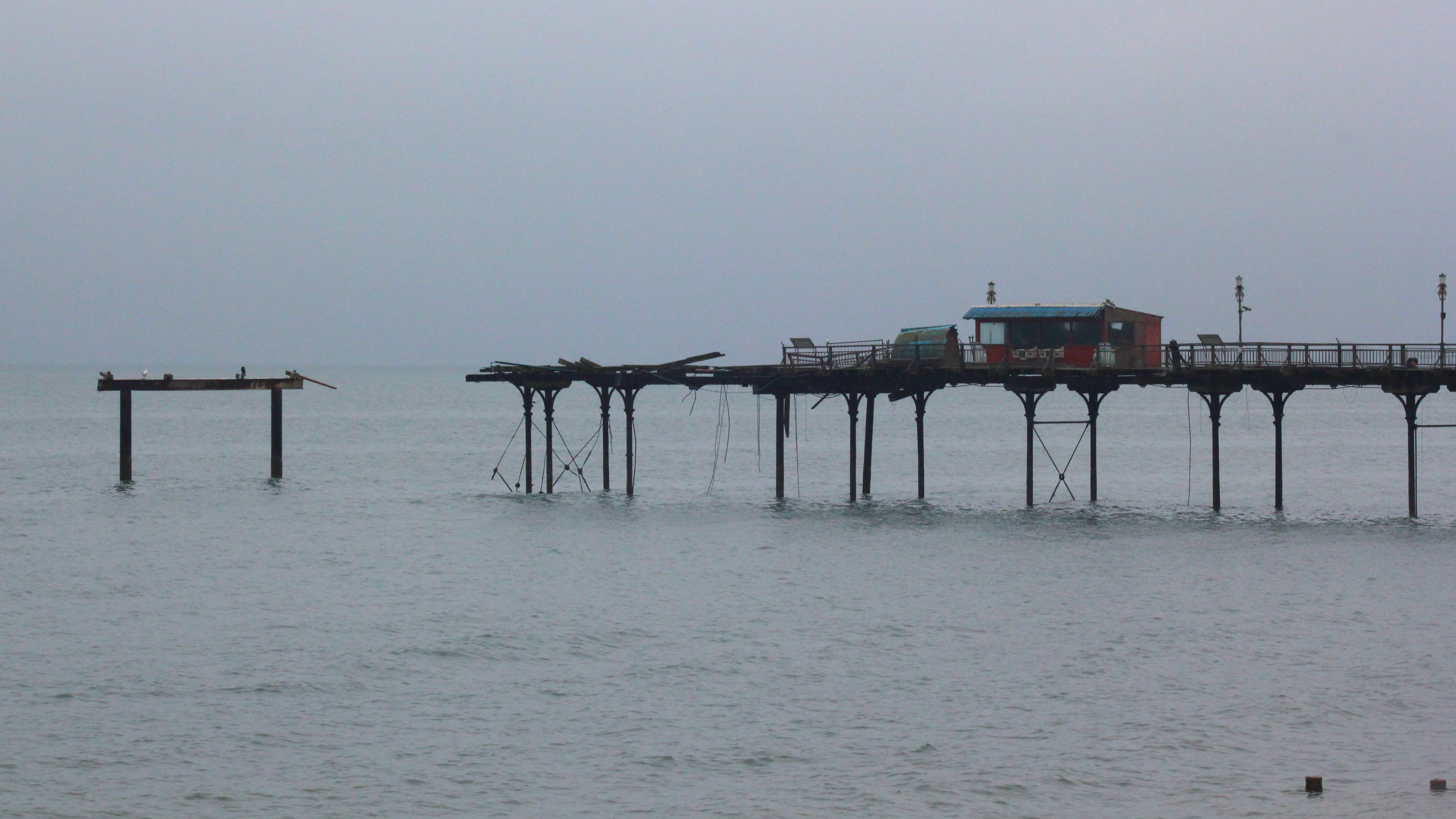
Damage to the end of Teignmouth Pier caused by Storm Ingrid in January 2026

Part of the pier was destroyed in January 2026 by Storm Ingrid.
