= Lommel German war cemetery =

Cemetery in Lommel, Belgium

Coordinates: 51°11′20″N 5°18′22″E

- German War Graves Commission; Volksbund Deutsche Kriegsgräberfürsorge.
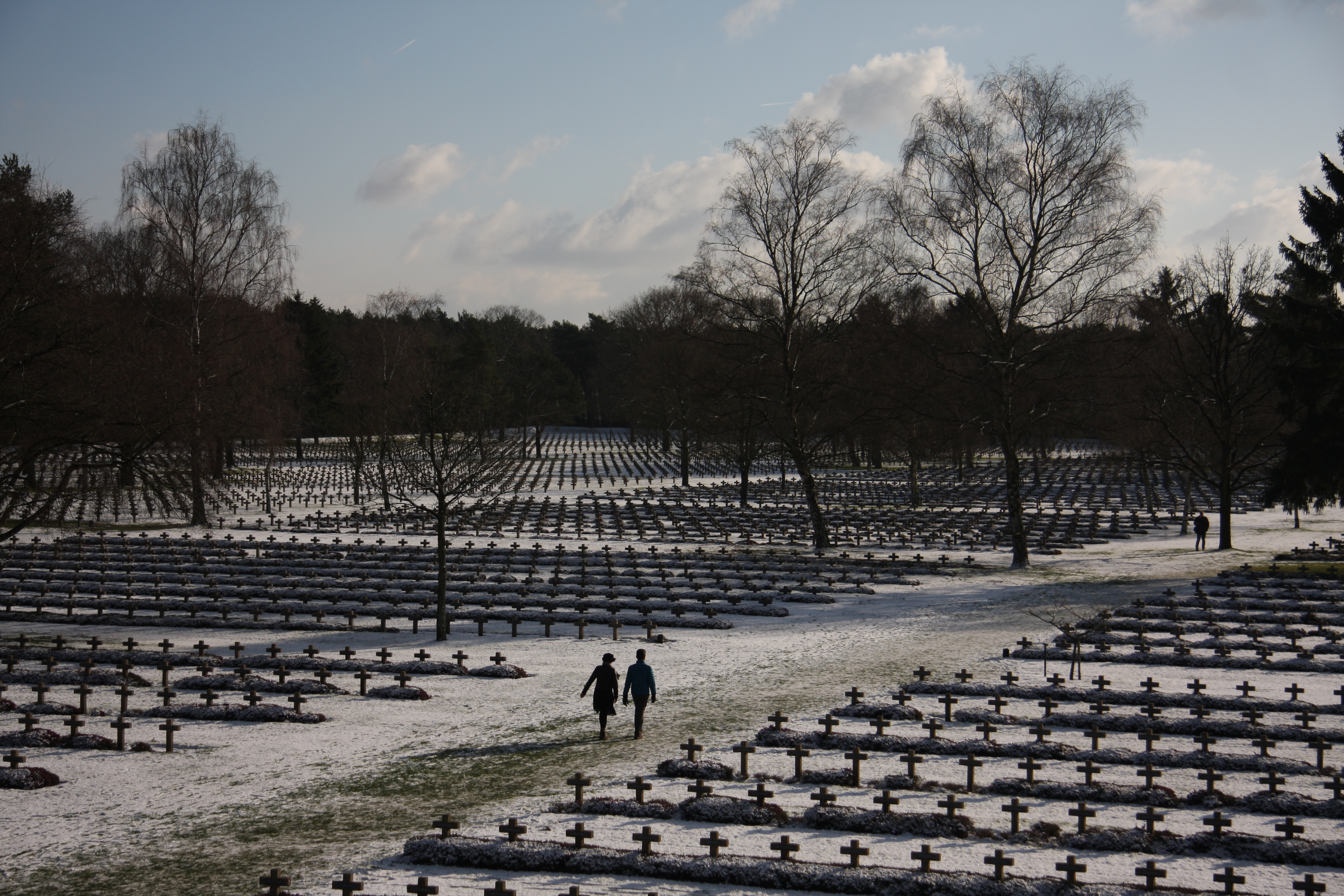
- Used for those deceased
- Established: 1946
- Location: near Lommel
- Total burials: 39,111
- Unknowns: 6,221

Burials by nation
- Imperial Germany, Nazi Germany

Burials by war
- World War I, World War II

Lommel German war cemetery is located at Kattenbos in the municipality of Lommel, Belgium. It is the largest German military cemetery in Western Europe outside Germany itself. German soldiers who died during the World War II on the territory of Belgium rest here. In addition, there is a smaller number of soldiers buried who died during the First World War.

== Figures ==
The site has 16 ha and more than 39,000 soldiers from the Second World War are buried here. They are mostly coming from collective cemeteries in Henri-Chapelle, Fossé, Overrepen and Neuville-en-Condroz. They were temporarily buried there by the American Battle Monuments Commission and then transferred to Lommel in 1946 and 1947. Since 1946, when the Belgian government started the construction of the cemetery, all German soldiers from the Second World War who were found on Belgian territory were buried here. Additionally, 483 soldiers from the First World War came from a soldiers' cemetery in Leopoldsburg.

As of 2016, a total of 39,108 people was known to be buried here. The number has slightly increased over time because the remains of missing victims were found. On 21 September 2019, the International Day of Peace, three unknown soldiers were buried in memory of 75 years of liberation and the 100th anniversary of the German War Graves Commission. On this special occasion, a "peace bell" was also cast, which was then placed in the courtyard in front of the crypt.

The casualties from World War II mainly died during the following campaigns:

- Eighteen Day Campaign (10–28 May 1940)
- 3 Battles of Aachen (13 September – 10 December 1944)
- Battle of the Hürtgen Forest (19 September 1944 – 10 February 1945)
- Battle of the Bulge (16 December 1944 – 30 January 1945)

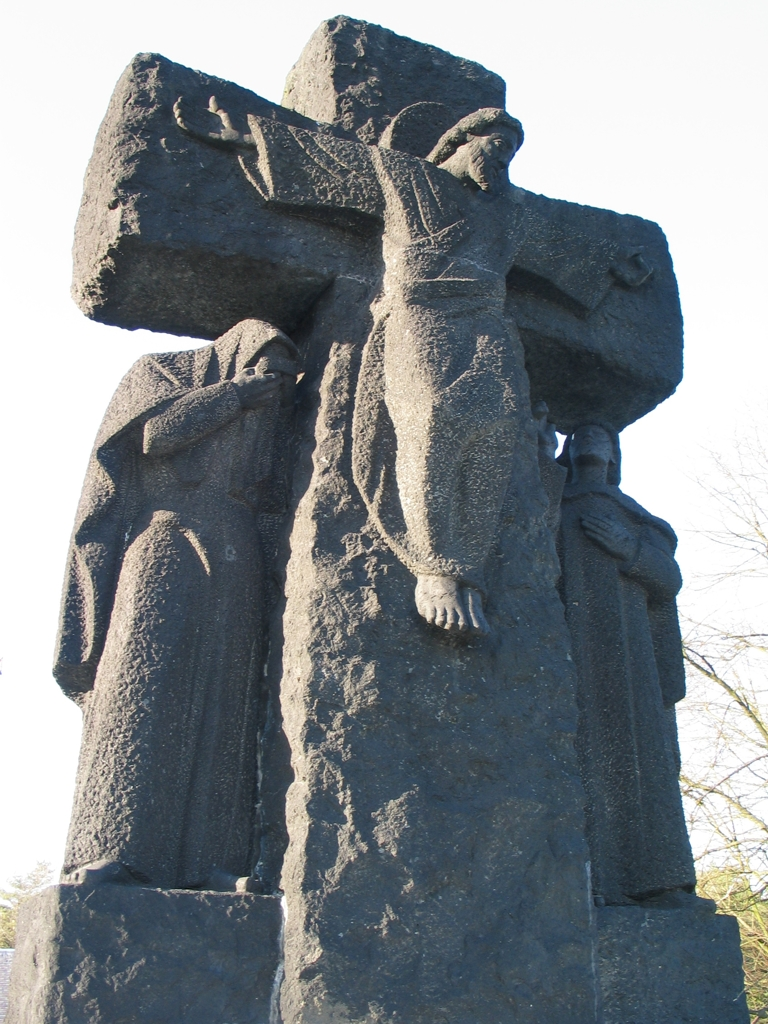
The crucifixion on the crypt

- Operation Lumberjack (in the night of 7 to 8 March 1945)

== Arrangement of the graveyard ==
In 1952 the cemetery was handed over to the German War Graves Commission – Volksbund Deutsche Kriegsgräberfürsorge e.V., by the means of a War Graves Agreement. They planted and furnished the cemetery. Due to the many excavations, the soil structure was largely destroyed, resulting in a desert-like soil surface. As a result, in windy weather, the sand was blown over the cemetery in large clouds of dust.

In 1953, the restoration of the soil was started by supplying large quantities of peat and forest soil; in addition, thousands of trees, shrubs and erikas were planted. An earthen wall with a total length of 1100 m was also built around the entire area. The grave service was assisted by young people from the youth work camp. Whereas in 1953 about 100 mainly German youth assisted, in 1954 there were already almost 400 young people from 16 different countries. Many young people from these summer youth camps in '53/'54/'55 were members of various youth organizations, such as CJVM (Christlicher Verein Junger Menschen), Kolpingnetwerk or Jugendbauwerk Schleswig-Holstein. They used the slogan: "Reconciliation through the graves". Later, "Work for Peace" was added. The youth camps were from Lommel and almost every European country with German war cemeteries.

In the youth meeting house Huis Over Grenzen, which opened in 1993, international (youth) meetings take place. This educational center mainly serves as a peace and remembrance center, where visitors can, among other things, talk to eyewitnesses and relatives of war victims. The intention is to contribute beyond the graves to achieve peace and European unification.

== Access ==
There is extensive information about the history of the cemetery at the entrance, as well as an information center. The cemetery can be entered via a crypt designed by Robert Tischler on which there is a large crucifixion group made of basalt from the Eifel. The statues of John and Mary are 3.30 meters high; the total height of the statues is 6 meters, and the weight is 39 tons. In the crypt is an effigy of a fallen soldier.

Approximately in the middle of the cemetery is a memorial stone, which originally came from the Brussels-Evere honorary cemetery.

In 1995 a tree was planted, a ginkgo, Japanese nut tree, as a sign of hope and in memory; not only to the Second World War, but also to 6 August 1945. On that date, the Allies dropped an atomic bomb over the Japanese city of Hiroshima. Next to the tree is a text board in three languages;

- Dutch: "Symbool van hoop en vrede. Geplant ter herdenking op de 50e verjaardag van het einde van de oorlog"
- French: "En signe d'espoir et de paix. Planté à l'occasion du 50ème anniversaire de la fin de la guerre"
- German: "Als Zeichen der Hof fnung des Friedens. Gepflanzt anlässlich des 50. Jahrestages des Kriegsendes" meaning: "Symbol of hope and peace. Planted to commemorate the 50th anniversary of the end of the war"

== Identification of the deceased ==
For each two soldiers there is usually one cross. However, there are some graves, which contain the remains of several individuals.

In the mid-twentieth century, DNA research did not yet exist, so in some cases it was difficult to determine to whom certain body parts belonged. In some cases, brothers are buried together. In addition, some fallen medical staff (doctors, nurses) have also found a final resting place here. Initially, 13,000 remains were unidentified. Of these, about 7,000 had become known until 2008. By mid-2017, 6,480 cases had not yet been identified.

Attempts were made to find out the name, date of birth, date of death and rank or position of each case, but in many cases this did not work; many German archives went up in flames during the Allied bombing raids. In particular, of the fallen from the First World War, except for some, only the name and date of death are known. Each person that rests in Lommel has a box number combined with a row number on the cross.

== Extremism ==
In the past, the cemetery has been repeatedly used for anti-democratic rallies, including neo-Nazis of the Blood & Honour movement.

Thanks to a special municipal ordinance, which was drawn up in consultation with the cemetery's managers, this extremism has been put to an end. In November 2008, two Dutch neo-Nazis were convicted of giving the Hitler salute during a neo-Nazi meeting on the spot.

== Sources ==
1. Lommel, military cemetery, 39,108 graves
2. ↑ Dutch sentenced to 1,100 euro fine for Hitler salute
