= South Pier, Lowestoft =

Pier in Lowestoft, Suffolk, England

South Pier
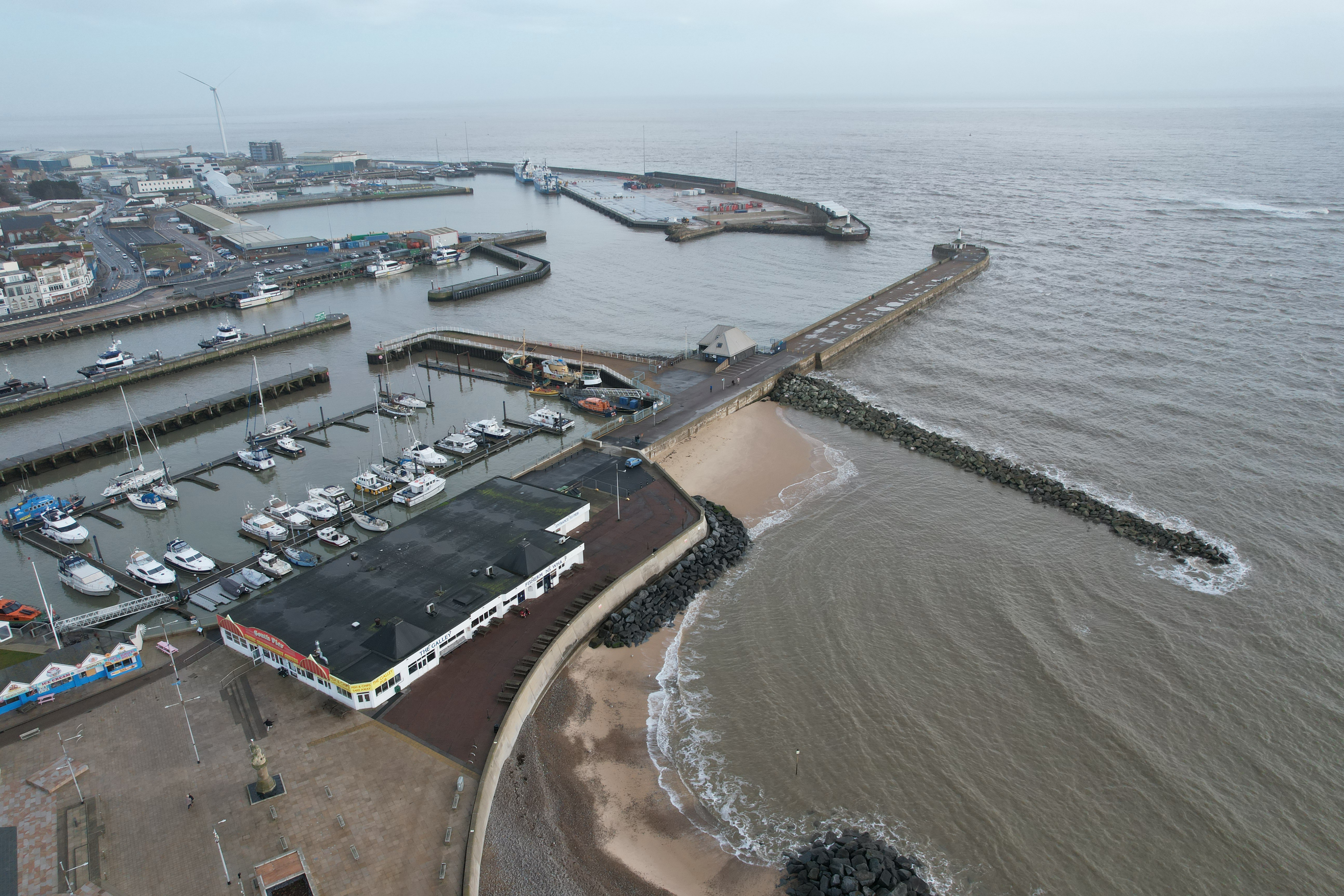
- The South Pier in January 2026
- Type: Pleasure
- Carries: Pedestrians
- Location: Lowestoft
- Coordinates: 52.4715°N 1.7544°E
- Owner: Oulton Broad Leisure Ltd

Characteristics
- Total length: 1,320 feet (400 m)

History
- Designer: William Cubitt
- Opening date: 1864; 162 years ago

South Pier is a leisure pier in Lowestoft, Suffolk, engineered by William Cubitt and opened in 1846 at a length of 1,320 feet (400 m). The pavilion was used by the Royal Naval Patrol Service as a headquarters during World War I, although it suffered significant damage during World War II and was subsequently demolished.

== History ==
=== 19th century ===
The pier opened in 1846 and was built in association with harbour works. Around June 1850, the esplanade around the pier was completed, described as being "one of the finest and most extensive promenades on the coast, combined with marine views of the greatest variety and beauty". In 1854, a reading room was built and 30 years later, a jetty was constructed, although both were destroyed during a fire in 1885 and rebuilt around 1890. The pier was strengthened in 1928 with concrete.

=== 20th century ===
During World War I, the pavilion was used a headquarters for the Royal Naval Patrol Service's commanding officer. By the 1930s, the resort was at its height and the pier was among its major attractions.

The replacement reading room and pavilion was heavily damaged during World War II and were subsequently demolished. On 2 May 1956, the Duke of Edinburgh opened a new pavilion. Around this time, the pier also had a miniature railway. In 1975, a new shoreward leisure centre building was erected, at a cost of £220,000 (equivalent to £2,021,800 in 2024) while improvements to the pavilion were also made.

Plans to incorporate the pier into a new marina were announced towards the late 1980s, following a report of structural issues that resulted in the closure of the seaward end. Despite the pavilion being demolished around 1989, no developments had occurred by June 1990. Following a £30,000 (equivalent to £61,400 in 2024) refurbishment by the council, the entire pier reopened in June 1993.

=== 21st century ===
Major refurbishments were undertaken during 2008. The pier was closed in 2013 by its then-owner, Associated British Ports, due to public safety fears. Anglers, who would frequently visit the pier, called for access to be restored and were supported by national organisation the Angling Trust. The pier had been leased for 20 years by Waveney District Council, who explained that financial restraints, in particular maintenance and public liability costs, prevented them from renewing the lease.

Having subsequently reopened in 2015 with the help of businessman Danny Steel and Waveney MP Peter Aldous, the pier received a £1,000 donation from the Post Office in 2019 to help secure its future for the following year.

In July 2021, it was announced that a sponsorship deal with CityFibre lasting for 12 months would help financially secure the future of the pier.
