= Bognor Regis Pier =

Pier in Bognor Regis, West Sussex, England

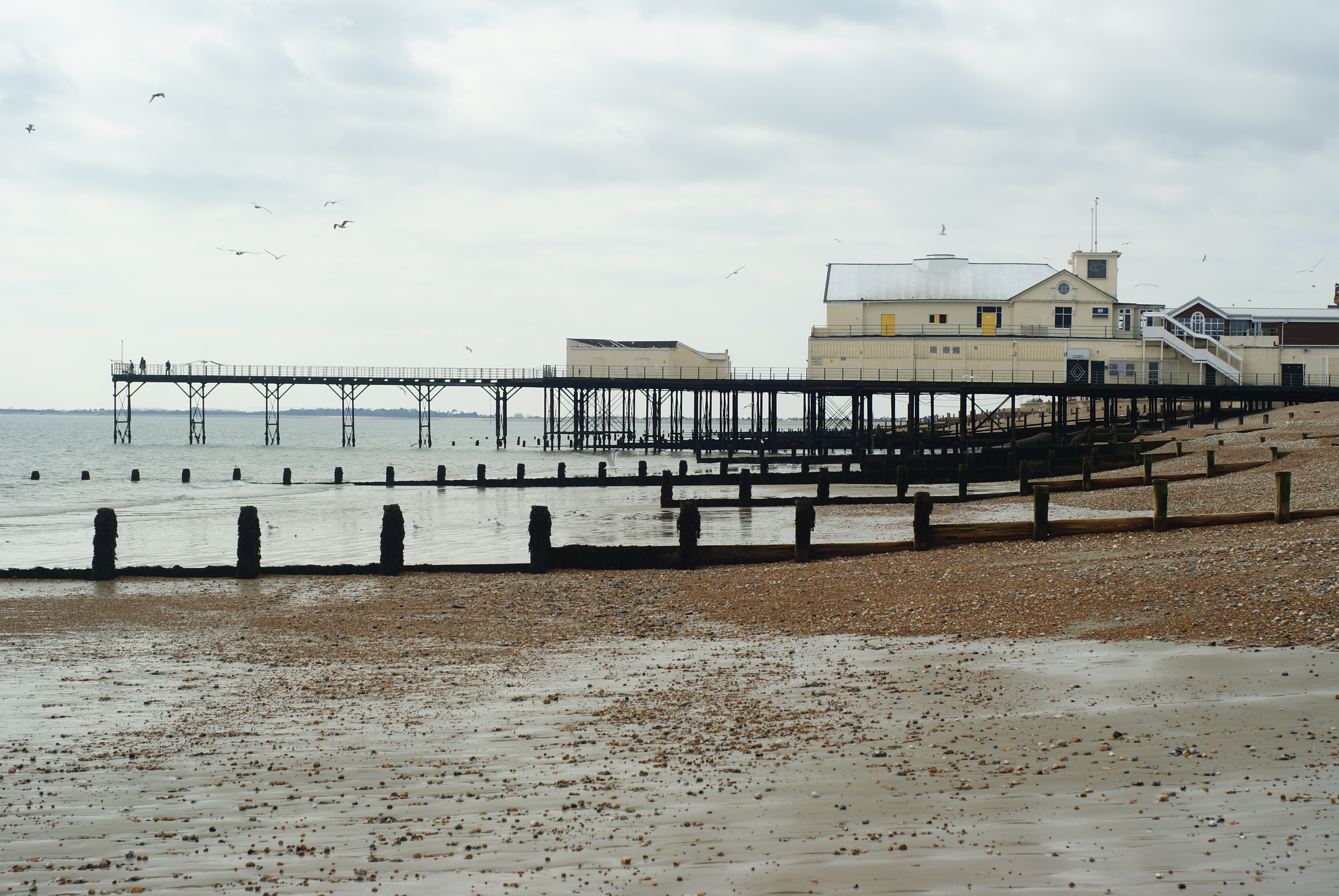
- Type: Pleasure pier
- Coordinates: 50.7811°N 0.6759°W
- Official name: Bognor Regis Pier
- Owner: Bognor Pier Leisure Ltd

Characteristics
- Total length: 117 yards (107 m)

History
- Designer: Sir Charles Fox and J. W. Wilson
- Opening date: 5 May 1865
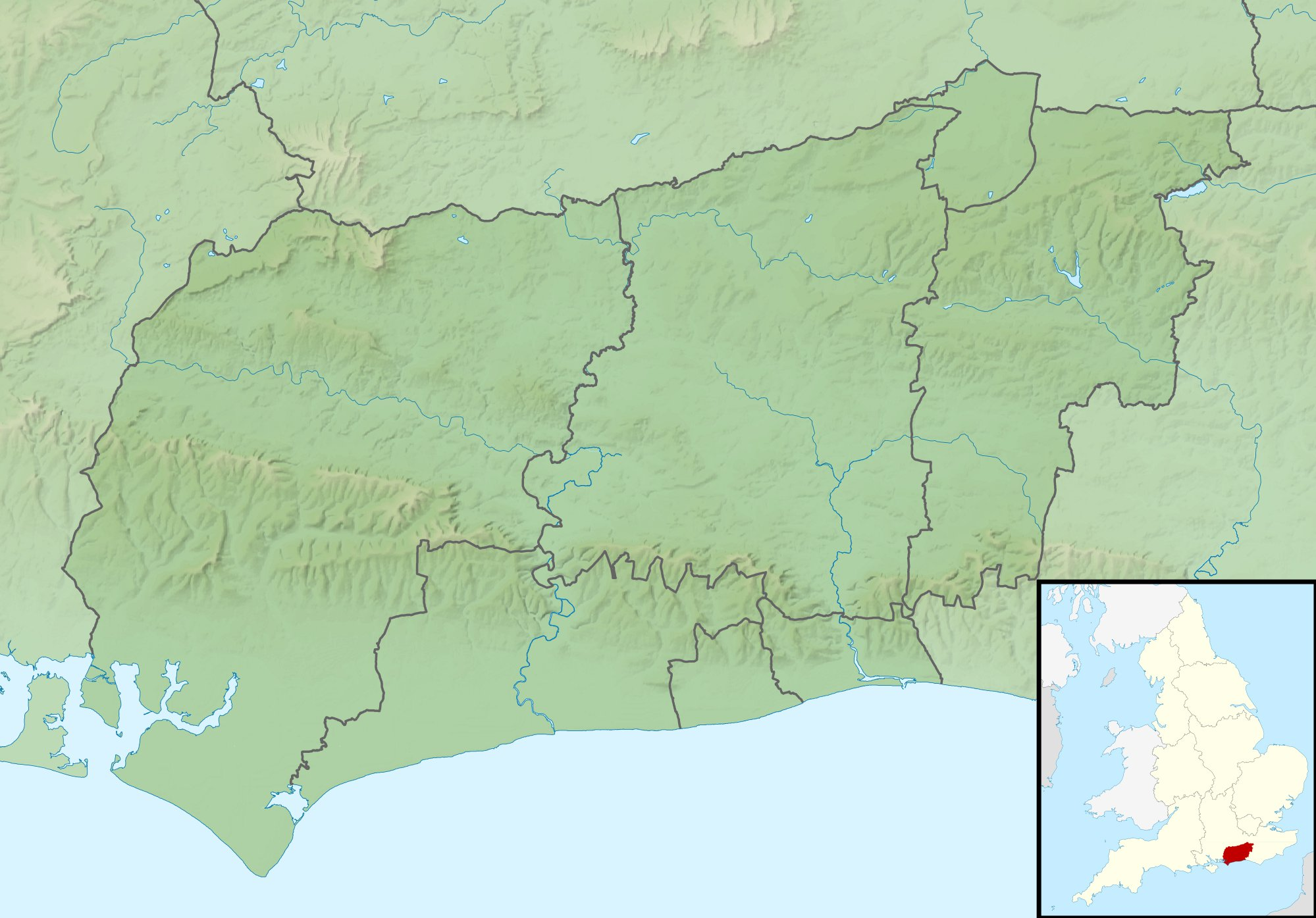
- Location in West Sussex

Bognor Regis Pier is a pier located in the seaside resort of Bognor Regis, West Sussex. The pier opened on 5 May 1865 to the design of Sir Charles Fox and J. W. Wilson. Initially constructed with a length of 1000 ft (305m), it now stands at 350 ft (107m). The pier is Grade II listed.

The pier continued to be developed after opening, with a pavilion being built in 1900. A seaward was also built around this time.

During World War II the pier became a Royal Navy observation station, named HMS St Barbara.

In 1964 and 1965, storm damage destroyed the pavilion. A series of fires in 1974 led to the pier being closed.

In 1989, Bognor Regis Pier was awarded a Grade II listing status by English Heritage. Despite this, the condition of the pier continued to decline, and in 1994 an application was made to demolish the structure's remaining seaward end.

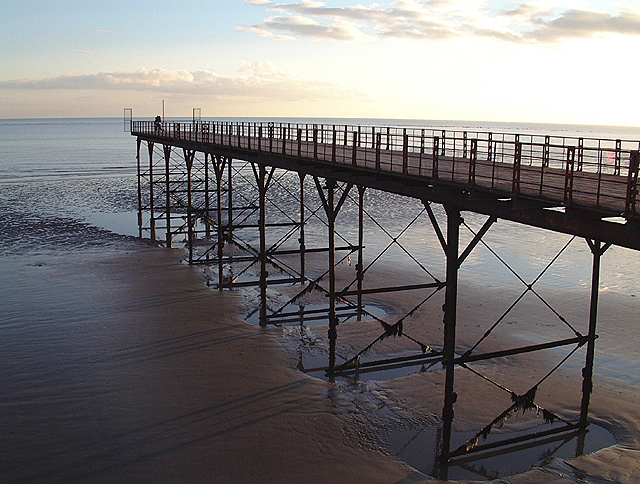
Bognor Regis Pier at low tide

The International Bognor Birdman is an annual competition for human-powered 'flying' machines held each summer in Bognor Regis. Contestants launch themselves from the end of the pier, a prize being awarded to the one who glides the furthest distance. Rarely taken completely seriously, the event provides competitors with an opportunity to construct improbable machines complete with outlandish dress. The spectacle draws a sizeable crowd in addition to the local media. Inaugurated in nearby Selsey in 1971, the Birdman transferred to Bognor in 1978 when it had outgrown its original location. Competitors have included Richard Branson.

The Birdman Event of 2008 was transferred to Worthing after 60 feet (18 m) of pier had been removed by the owners due to storm damage in March 2008. This meant that there were question marks over the possible safety of the contestants landing in shallower water. The shortened pier was judged safe for the event in 2010, and the event subsequently returned to Bognor. Annual events now take place at both locations.
