= Totland Pier =

Pleasure pier in Totland

- Totland Pier in 2026
- Type: Pleasure pier
- Spans: The Solent
- Location: Totland
- Coordinates: 50.6834°N 1.5458°W
- Owner: Totland Pier Ltd

Characteristics
- Total length: 137 metres (449 ft)

History
- Constructor: SH & SW Yockney
- Construction start: 1879
- Opening date: 1880
- Closure date: 1980

Pier and Harbour Orders Confirmation Act 1879
- Act of Parliament
- Parliament of the United Kingdom
- Long title: An Act to confirm certain Provisional Orders made by the Board of Trade under the General Pier and Harbour Act, 1861, relating to Ramsgate, St. Anne's-on-the-Sea, Skegness, Strachur (Loch Fyne), Totland Bay, Westgate, Whitehall (Stronsay), Cromarty, Fortrose, Lybster, Penzance, and Torquay.
- Citation: 42 & 43 Vict. c. lv

Dates
- Royal assent: 3 July 1879
Other legislation
Relates to	General Pier and Harbour Act 1861

Totland Pier is a pier located in the town of Totland on the Isle of Wight.

The pier has been effectively closed to the public since 1980 despite significant investment and various renovation projects.

== History ==
Totland Pier was opened in March 1880 primarily to provide ferry access to the Totland Bay Hotel as well as promenading. It replaced a derelict wooden jetty. There were amusements at the shore end and a small shelter at the pier head. The last ferry service took place in 1927 and the final pleasure cruises took place in 1931.

During World War 2, the pier was sectioned for security reasons but reopened in June 1951. Soon after a new shelter was built at the pier head to replace the original.

Trinity House purchased the pier in the early 1970s and installed a data gathering centre in 1975 but the pier remained open to visitors. In 1978 the amusements at the shore end were damaged in a fire and by 1980 the pier was closed. In 1987 the pier was damaged in a storm and repair costs increased.

The old cafe at the shore end in 2009.

In 1992 the pier was sold for £1000. The pier was briefly in use again when the MV Balmoral visited in 1993 but vandalism meant that the pier was still never fully repaired. The pier was sold again in 1993 for £19,500. The walkway and pier head remained closed although the cafe at the shore end was open.

In 1999 the artist, Derek Barran purchased the pier and restored the shelter at the pier head with a small kitchen and bunkroom in order to use it as an art studio. A year later the landing stage was repaired.

In 2012 the pier was purchased by Farnham Developments. Over the next decade various plans and proposals were made to restore the pier and cafe but little progress was made. In 2020 construction started on a new two-storey cafe building at the shore end. The cafe was expected to be completed by May 2020 but work was not completed until 2021 by which point contruction on a two storey resutarant at the pier head was also underway. The cafe was only open for one season before it was closed again and in late 2021 the pier went up for sale. In May 2025 the pier went up for sale again with the structure on the pier head still unfinished and inaccessible to the public.
