= Chain pier =

A chain pier was a type of pier. It may refer to:

- Royal Suspension Chain Pier, (1823-1896), in Brighton
- Seaview Chain Pier, (1881-1952), near Ryde on the Isle of Wight
- Trinity Chain Pier, (1821-1898), near Edinburgh
- Chain Pier, Brighton (painting), 1827 painting by John Constable
- The Chain Pier, Brighton (Turner), 1828 painting by J.M.W. Turner
