= Captain Brown =

Captain Brown may refer to:

- Captain Samuel Brown (1776-1852), British civil engineer
- Captain Eric Brown (pilot) (1919–2016), British Royal Navy officer and test pilot
- Captain Roy Brown (RAF officer) (1893–1944), Canadian World War I flying ace
- Captain Brown, a fictional character in TV series Captain Scarlet and the Mysterons
