= List of listed buildings in Hutton, Scottish Borders =

This is a list of listed buildings in the parish of Hutton in the Scottish Borders, Scotland.

== List ==
Name	Location	Date listed	Geo-coordinates	Notes	Category	LB number	Image
Paxton House Estate, North Lodge And West Lodge Including Boundary Walls, Railings, Gates And Piers			55°45′59″N 2°06′32″W		C(S)	10508	Upload Photo
Hutton Castle (Formerly Hutton/Hatton Hall) Including Ancillary Structure			55°47′15″N 2°10′42″W		B	10524	Upload Photo
Hutton Castle, Boundary Walls, Railings, Pier, Gatepiers And Gates At West Lodge			55°47′08″N 2°11′03″W		C(S)	10526	Upload Photo
Hutton, Hutton Church (Church Of Scotland) Including Burial Vault, Graveyard, War Memorial, Boundary Walls, Railings, Gatepiers And Gates			55°46′45″N 2°08′55″W		B	6815	Upload Photo
Paxton, The Old School			55°46′18″N 2°06′31″W		B	6821	Upload Photo
Paxton House Estate, Dene Cottage			55°45′49″N 2°06′39″W		C(S)	47696	Upload Photo
Paxton, The Schoolhouse			55°46′17″N 2°06′29″W		C(S)	47702	Upload Photo
Paxton House Estate, Entrance Comprising South Lodge, East Lodge, Quadrant Walls, Piers And Entrance Screen			55°45′58″N 2°06′32″W		B	10507	Upload Photo
Clarabad Farm, Former Horse Mill And Barn			55°46′51″N 2°07′09″W		C(S)	47681	Upload Photo
Clarabad Farmhouse			55°46′51″N 2°07′06″W		C(S)	47682	Upload Photo
Hutton Castle, Quadrant Walls, Gatepiers And Gates At East Lodge			55°46′59″N 2°10′21″W		C(S)	47689	Upload Photo
Hutton Hall Barns Farm Steading Including Ancillary Structure And Boundary Walls			55°47′00″N 2°10′33″W		C(S)	47693	Upload Photo
Spital House, Walled Garden			55°46′19″N 2°07′45″W		C(S)	47709	Upload Photo
Union Suspension Bridge, Bridge House (Former Tollhouse)			55°45′08″N 2°06′32″W		C(S)	47714	Upload Photo
Union Suspension Bridge Including Pylons, Piers And Walls, aka Union Bridge (Tweed)			55°45′09″N 2°06′25″W		A	13645	Upload another image
Hutton Castle, East Lodge			55°46′59″N 2°10′21″W		C(S)	10505	Upload Photo
Hutton Castle, West Lodge Including Boundary Railings			55°47′08″N 2°11′03″W		C(S)	10525	Upload Photo
Tweedhill House Including Ancillary Structure			55°45′17″N 2°06′50″W		C(S)	6818	Upload Photo
Fishwick Mains Steading			55°44′43″N 2°08′11″W		C(S)	47686	Upload Photo
Paxton House Estate, Garden Cottage Including Ancillary Range			55°45′53″N 2°06′41″W		C(S)	47698	Upload Photo
Paxton House Estate, Ice House			55°45′47″N 2°06′29″W		C(S)	47699	Upload Photo
Paxton, War Memorial Including Bollards And Chains			55°46′09″N 2°06′32″W		C(S)	47704	Upload Photo
Scotch New Water Shiel			55°45′11″N 2°06′30″W		C(S)	47705	Upload Photo
Spital House Including Service Courtyard And Garden Walls And Gatepiers			55°46′16″N 2°07′35″W		B	47706	Upload Photo
Spital House, Quadrant Walls, Piers, Gatepiers & Gate			55°46′06″N 2°07′42″W		C(S)	47708	Upload Photo
Paxton South Mains Including Farmhouse, Steading, Boundary Walls, Railings, Pier, Gatepiers And Gate			55°46′00″N 2°06′35″W		B	6817	Upload Photo
Clarabad Mill Including Cottage			55°46′55″N 2°06′29″W		C(S)	47683	Upload Photo
Fishwick Mains, Fishing Shiel Including Ice House, Near St Thomas's Island			55°44′21″N 2°07′07″W		C(S)	47687	Upload Photo
Hutton, Smiddy Cottage Including Former Smithy And Boundary Walls			55°46′42″N 2°08′54″W		C(S)	47691	Upload Photo
Nabdean Farmhouse Including Former Cartshed And Granary, Ancillary Structure, Implement Shed And Boundary Walls			55°45′51″N 2°07′14″W		C(S)	47694	Upload Photo
Spital Mains Including Farmhouse, Cottage, Steading, Threshing Mill, Boundary Walls And Gatepiers			55°46′08″N 2°07′16″W		B	47710	Upload Photo
Sunwick Farmhouse Including Boundary Wall			55°45′59″N 2°09′44″W		B	47711	Upload Photo
Tweedhill House, Boundary Wall, Quadrant Walls, Piers And Gatepiers			55°45′21″N 2°07′10″W		C(S)	47713	Upload Photo
Broadmeadows Home Farm, West Range			55°46′54″N 2°07′52″W		C(S)	47680	Upload Photo
Fishwick Mains Farmhouse Including Ancillary Range And Boundary Walls			55°44′41″N 2°08′16″W		C(S)	47685	Upload Photo
2, 3, 4 And 5 Hutton Hall Barns Farm Cottages Including Cobbled Path			55°46′59″N 2°10′25″W		C(S)	47692	Upload Photo
Spital House, Bridge Spanning Netherlough Burn			55°46′14″N 2°07′40″W		C(S)	47707	Upload Photo
Hutton Castle, Hutton Castle Mill, Kiln And Bridge			55°47′10″N 2°09′17″W		B	48613	Upload Photo
Paxton House Estate, Bridge Spanning Linn Burn			55°45′47″N 2°06′29″W		B	6816	Upload Photo
Hutton, Antrim House (Former Manse) Including Ancillary Structure, Boundary Walls And Gatepiers			55°46′49″N 2°08′56″W		C(S)	47688	Upload Photo
Paxton, Paxton Church (Church Of Scotland) Including Boundary Walls, Railings, Gatepiers And Gates			55°46′15″N 2°06′23″W		C(S)	47701	Upload another image See more images
Tweedhill Garden			55°45′14″N 2°06′59″W		C(S)	47712	Upload Photo
Tweedhill Stables Including Garden Walls And Bridge			55°45′14″N 2°06′55″W		C(S)	6819	Upload Photo
Paxton House Estate, The Dower House (Former Factor's House)			55°45′50″N 2°07′00″W		A	47697	Upload Photo
Paxton House Estate, Paxton House			55°45′40″N 2°06′36″W		A	10506	Upload Photo
Paxton House Estate, Boundary Walls, Railings And Gatepiers			55°45′58″N 2°06′41″W		C(S)	10509	Upload Photo
Fishwick Mortuary Chapel Including Graveyard And Boundary Wall			55°44′40″N 2°07′14″W		C(S)	6822	Upload Photo
Finchy Shiel Including Ice House			55°45′49″N 2°05′31″W		C(S)	47684	Upload Photo
Hutton Castle, Walled Garden			55°47′12″N 2°10′54″W		C(S)	47690	Upload Photo
Paxton Brick And Tile Works Kiln Block (Former)			55°46′43″N 2°06′07″W		C(S)	47695	Upload Photo
Paxton House Estate, Walled Garden			55°45′50″N 2°06′34″W		C(S)	47700	Upload Photo
Paxton, Thorn Cottage Including Boundary Wall			55°46′18″N 2°06′33″W		C(S)	47703	Upload Photo

== Key ==
The scheme for classifying buildings in Scotland is:

- Category A: "buildings of national or international importance, either architectural or historic; or fine, little-altered examples of some particular period, style or building type."
- Category B: "buildings of regional or more than local importance; or major examples of some particular period, style or building type, which may have been altered."
- Category C: "buildings of local importance; lesser examples of any period, style, or building type, as originally constructed or moderately altered; and simple traditional buildings which group well with other listed buildings."

In March 2016 there were 47,288 listed buildings in Scotland. Of these, 8% were Category A, and 50% were Category B, with the remaining 42% being Category C.
