= James Anderson (civil engineer) =

Scottish civil engineer

James Anderson was a Scottish civil engineer.

He was born in Edinburgh on 22 January 1793. His father was a flax dresser. Anderson was a pupil of James Jardine. Assisted by Jardine and the work of Thomas Telford, he proposed two designs for a suspension Forth Bridge in 1818, but the idea was ahead of its time and was not taken up. In 1830 he was responsible for replacing the piles on the Trinity Chain Pier, which had been damaged by the marine crustacean Limnoria terebrans. In 1834 he wrote a treatise on proposed improvements to the harbour at Leith. In 1836 he was elected a Fellow of the Royal Society of Edinburgh. He became a harbour engineer and died in Edinburgh on 19 February 1861.
