= Fishwick, Scottish Borders =

Village in Scottish Borders, Scotland

Coordinates: 55.75337°N 2.13285°W

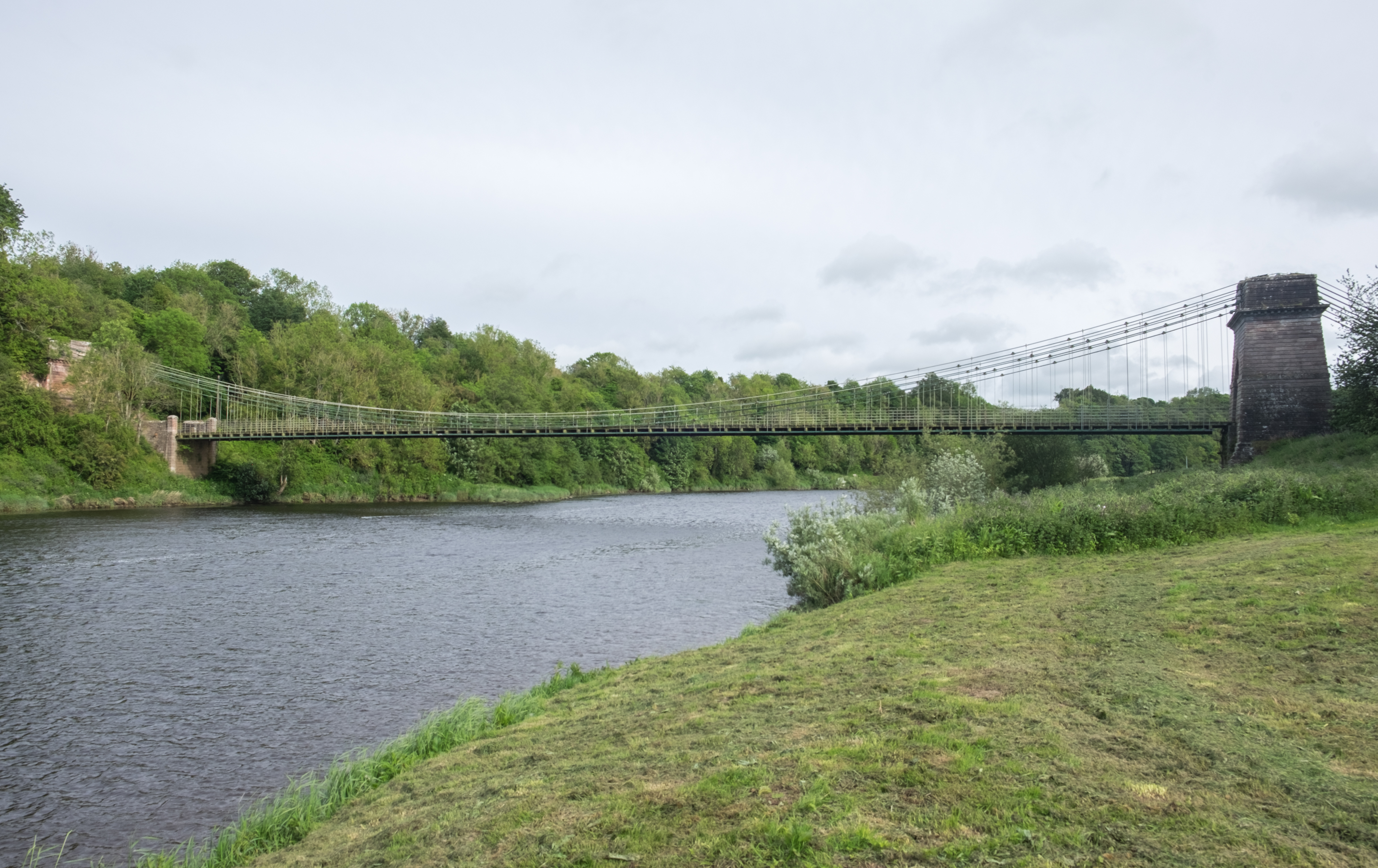
The Union Chain Bridge spanning the Tweed from near Fishwick into England

Fishwick is a parish with a small mediaeval village (now vanished) in the Scottish Borders, Scotland, in the traditional county of Berwickshire, seven miles from Berwick-upon-Tweed. The parish church is now a ruin and the parish is united with Hutton and Paxton. Today the parish consists of farms and scattered housing. There is also an old WWII airstrip, still occasionally used. Fishwick borders the north of the River Tweed which here constitutes the border with England.

Anciently Fishwick was a possession of Coldingham Priory a cell of the Bishopric of Durham. The superiorities of the Priory became part of the Barony of Coldingham which in 1621 was held by James, 2nd Earl of Home (d. 1633). A William Purves was a resident in Fishwick in Nov 1577 when he witnessed a Sasine.

Just south of the Tweed from Fishwick is the northernmost village in England, Horncliffe. Between Fishwick and Horncliffe is the famous Union Bridge, a very early suspension bridge dating from 1820. When it was opened it was the longest wrought-iron suspension bridge in the world, and it is still carrying traffic, though now only one vehicle at a time. One of the toll cottages was demolished in 1955. The crossing is now toll-free.
