= The Chain Pier, Brighton (Turner) =

Painting by J.M.W. Turner

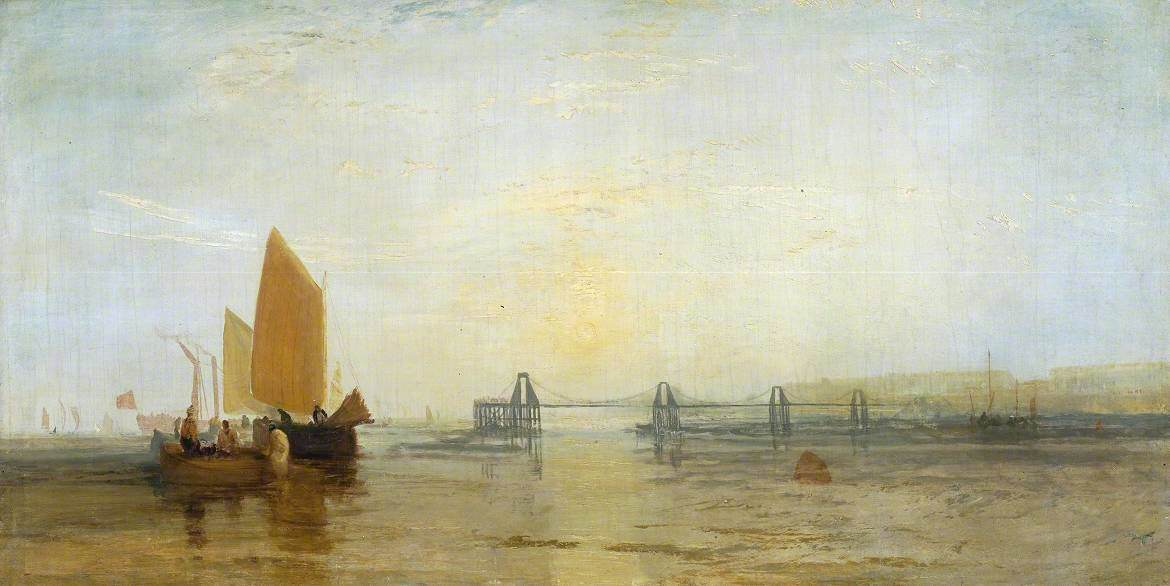
- Artist: Joseph Mallord William Turner
- Year: 1828
- Medium: Oil on canvas
- Dimensions: 136.5 cm × 71.1 cm (53.7 in × 28.0 in)
- Location: Tate Britain, London
- Accession: N02064
- Website: tate.org.uk/...n02064

The Chain Pier, Brighton is an 1828 landscape painting by the British artist J.M.W. Turner featuring a view of the sea at the resort town of Brighton in Southern England, dominated by the Royal Suspension Chain Pier which had opened five years earlier. The work was originally produced as an initial version for the art collector George Wyndham, 3rd Earl of Egremont's property at Petworth House where it was designed as one of four landscapes intended to fit under full-length portraits, explaining its unusual width. Egremont had been one of the investors in the construction of the pier.

A second version of the painting is on display at Petworth House.

The work was part of the Turner Bequest of 1856 and was in the National Gallery until 1906 before it was transferred to the Tate Britain. Turner's contemporary John Constable had produced his own painting Chain Pier, Brighton the previous year, which is also now in the Tate.

== See also ==
- List of paintings by J. M. W. Turner

== Bibliography ==
- Hamilton, James. Turner - A Life. Sceptre, 1998.
- Hermann, Luke. Turner: Paintings, Watercolours, Prints & Drawings. Phaidon, 1986.
- Thornes, John E. John Constable's Skies: A Fusion of Art and Science. A&C Black, 1999.
