= Union Chain Bridge =

Suspension bridge over the River Tweed, UK

Union Bridge
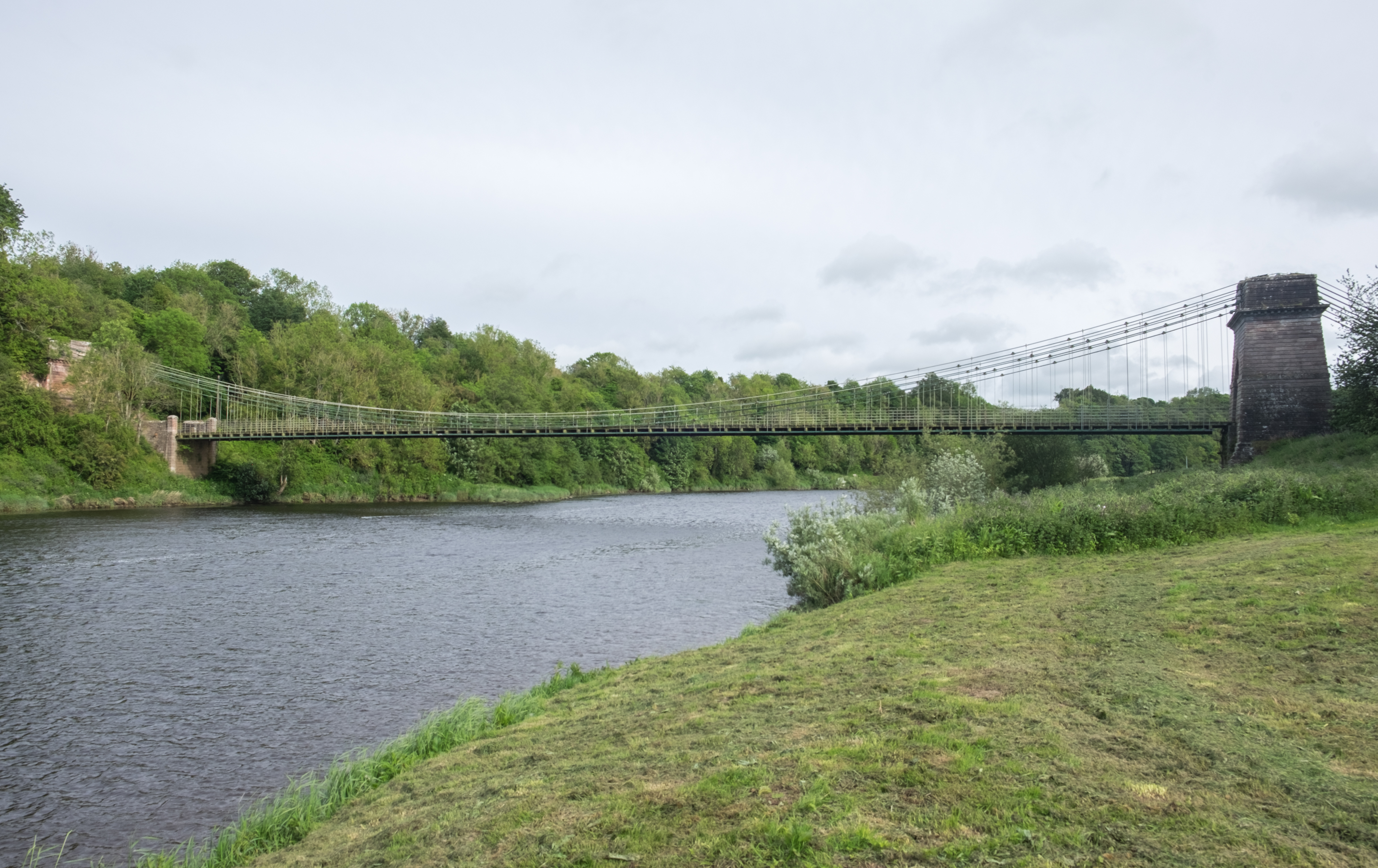
- The bridge from the north on the Scottish bank
- Coordinates: 55.7525°N 2.107°W
- Crosses: River Tweed

Characteristics
- Material: Wrought iron (original); Sandstone ashlar; Steel (modern upgrade)

History
- Designer: Captain Samuel Brown
- Construction start: 1819
- Opened: 26 July 1820; 205 years ago

Listed Building – Category A
- Official name: Union Suspension Bridge (that Part In Scotland)
- Designated: 8 June 1971
- Reference no.: LB13645

Location
- Interactive map of Union Bridge

The Union Chain Bridge or Union Bridge is a suspension bridge that spans the River Tweed between Horncliffe, Northumberland, England and Fishwick, Berwickshire, Scotland. It is four miles (6.4 km) upstream of Berwick-upon-Tweed.

When it opened in 1820 it was the longest wrought iron suspension bridge in the world with a span of 449 feet (137 m), and the first vehicular bridge of its type in the United Kingdom. Although work started on the Menai Suspension Bridge earlier, the Union Bridge was completed first. The suspension bridge, which is a Category A listed building in Scotland, is now the oldest to be still carrying road traffic.

The bridge is also a Grade I listed building in England and an International Historic Civil Engineering Landmark. It lies on Sustrans Route 1 and the Pennine Cycleway. Its chains are represented on the Flag of Berwickshire.

== History ==
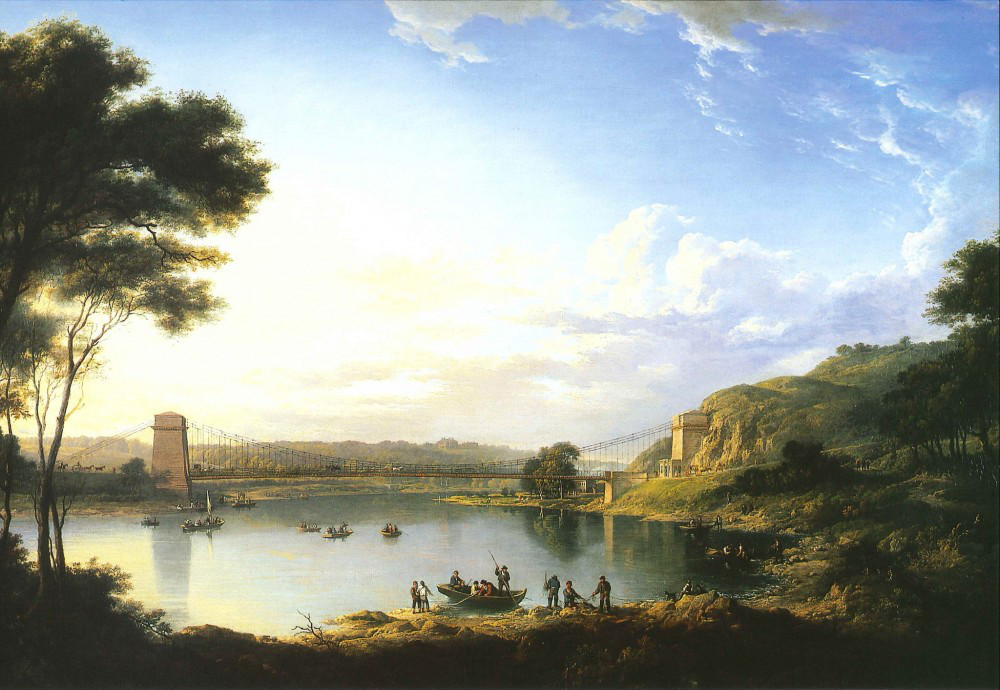
A painting of Union Chain Bridge by Alexander Nasmyth c. 1820

Before the opening of the Union Bridge, crossing the river at this point involved an 11-mile (18 km) round trip via Berwick downstream or a 20-mile (32 km) trip via Coldstream upstream. (Ladykirk and Norham Bridge did not open until 1888.) The Tweed was forded in the vicinity of the bridge site, but the route was impassable during periods of high water. The Berwick and North Durham Turnpike Trust took on responsibility for improving matters by issuing a specification for a bridge.

=== Construction ===
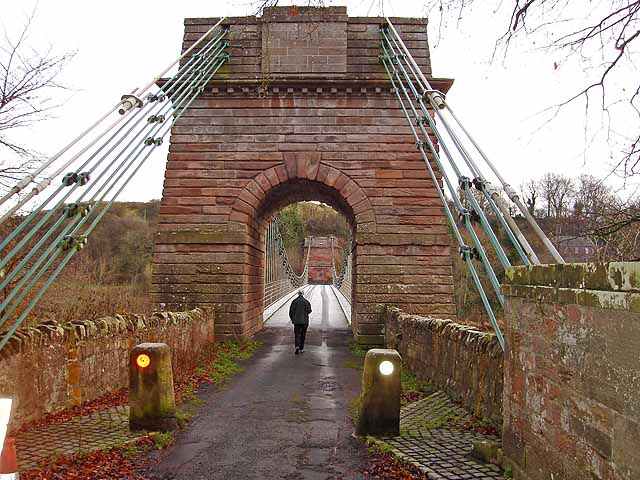
The sandstone pier on the Scottish side of the River Tweed

The bridge was designed by a Royal Navy officer, Captain Samuel Brown. Brown joined the Navy in 1795, and seeing the need for an improvement on the hemp ropes used, which frequently failed with resulting loss to shipping, he employed blacksmiths to create experimental wrought iron chains. HMS Penelope was fitted with iron rigging in 1806, and in a test voyage proved successful enough that in 1808, with his cousin Samuel Lenox, he set up a company that would become Brown Lenox & Co. Brown left the Navy in 1812, and in 1813 he built a prototype suspension bridge of 105 feet (32 m) span, using 296 stone (1,880 kg) of iron. It was sufficiently strong to support a carriage, and John Rennie and Thomas Telford reported favourably upon it.

Brown took out a patent in 1816 for a method of manufacturing chains, followed by a patent titled Construction of a Bridge by the Formation and Uniting of its Component Parts in July 1817. In around 1817, Brown proposed a 1,000 feet (300 m) span bridge over the River Mersey at Runcorn, but this bridge was not built. It is not known why Brown became involved with the Union Bridge project, but agreed to take on the work based on a specification dated September 1818.

Brown knew little of masonry, and Rennie did this aspect of the work.

The bridge proposal received consent in July 1819, with the authority of the Berwick and Durham Roads and Tweed Bridges Act 1802 (42 Geo. 3. c. cxvii), and construction began on 2 August 1819.

The bridge, which has its western end in Scotland and its eastern end in England, was built with a single span of 449 feet (137 m). There is a sandstone pier on the Scottish side, while the English side has a sandstone tower built into the side of the river bluffs that support the bridge's chains. The Scottish side has a straight approach road, but across the river, the road turns sharply south due to the river bank's steep sides.

It opened on 26 July 1820, with an opening ceremony attended by the celebrated Scottish civil engineer Robert Stevenson among others. Captain Brown tested the bridge in a curricle towing twelve carts before a crowd of about 700 spectators crossed. Until 1885, tolls were charged for crossing the bridge; the toll cottage on the English side was demolished in 1955.

=== Usage ===
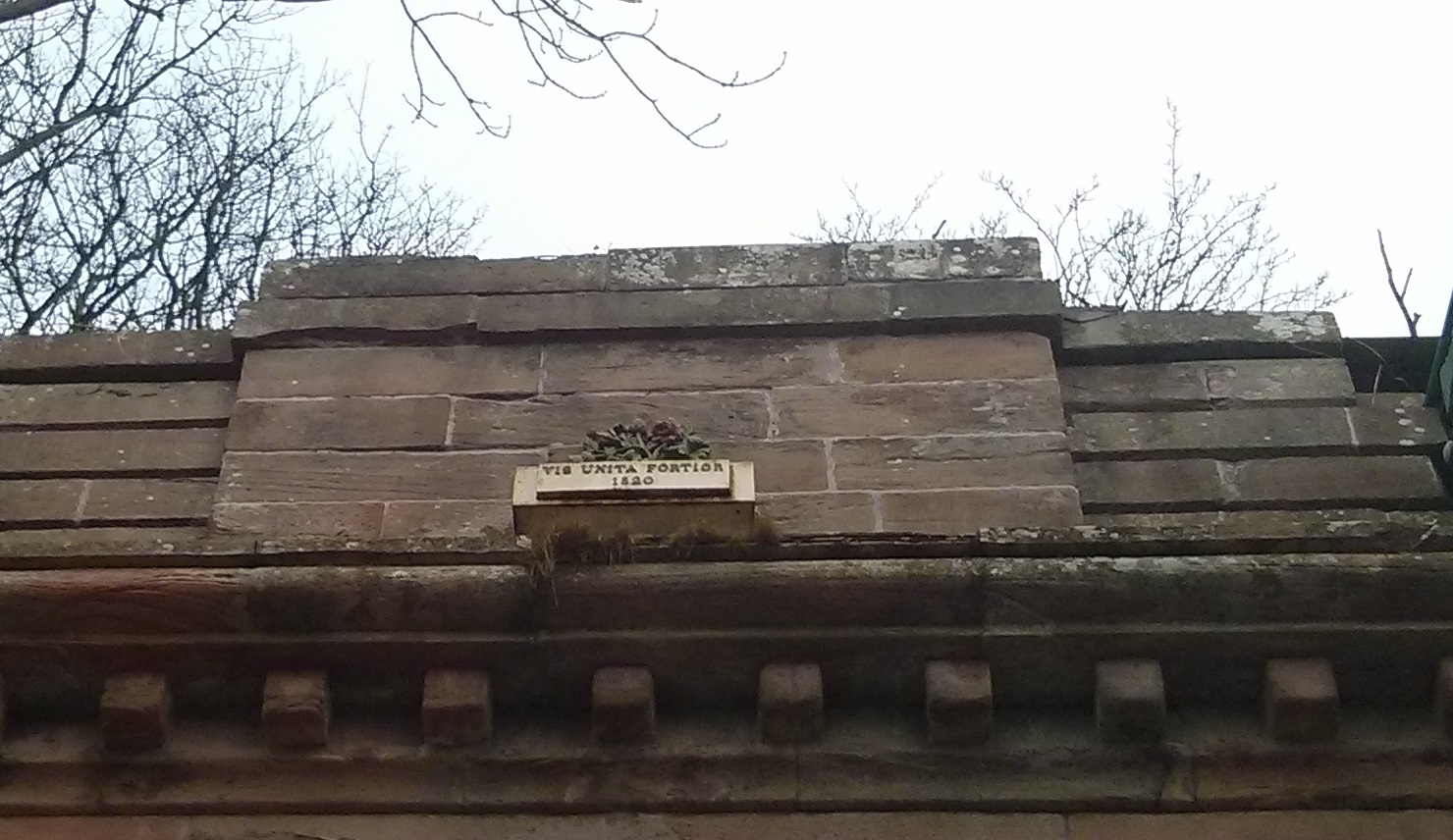
The bridge piers are adorned with an entwined rose and thistle coat of arms with the motto Vis Unita Fortior (Latin: "United, Strength is Yet Stronger")

With the abolition of turnpike tolls in 1883, maintenance of the bridge passed to the Tweed Bridges Trust. When the trust was wound up the bridge became the responsibility of Scottish Borders Council and Northumberland County Council and is now maintained by the latter.

In addition to the 1902 addition of cables, the bridge has been strengthened and refurbished on many occasions. The bridge deck was substantially renewed in 1871, and again in 1974, with the chains reinforced at intervals throughout its life.

== Maintenance and restoration ==
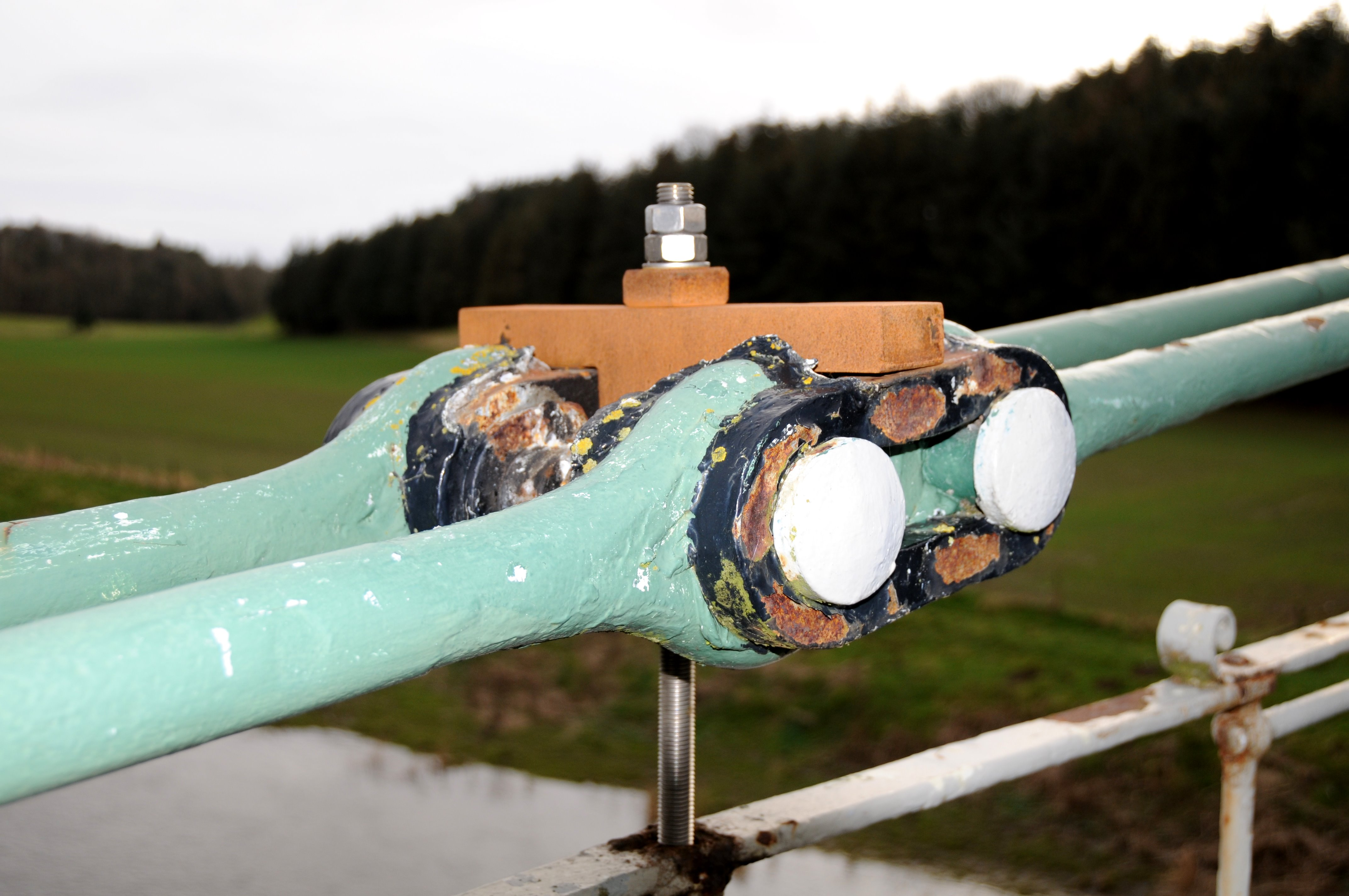
As a safety precaution, some of the 200-year-old chain links have required temporary hangers.

The bridge was closed to motor vehicles for several months during 2007 due to one of the bridge hangers breaking. In December 2008 the bridge was closed to traffic as a result of a landslide.

In March 2013 there was a proposal to close the bridge because there was a lack of funds to maintain it. In 2013, the bridge was placed on Historic England's Heritage at Risk register. In October 2014, local enthusiasts and activists started a campaign to have the bridge fully restored in time for its bicentenary in 2020.

In March 2017 Scottish Borders Council and Northumberland County Council agreed to contribute £550,000 each towards a restoration project that was then expected to cost £5 million. Between then and August 2020 further pledges were made by both councils, the National Lottery Heritage Fund and Historic England. The work started in October 2020 and was expected to cost £10.5 million and take around 18 months. The chains were cut in March 2021 and the restored bridge was due to re-open in early 2022. The bridge reopened on 17 April 2023. In July 2023, the bridge was designated as a Historic Civil Engineering Landmark by the American Society of Civil Engineers.

== See also ==
- List of bridges in Scotland
