= Samuel Brown (Royal Navy officer) =

English pioneer suspension bridge engineer and inventor

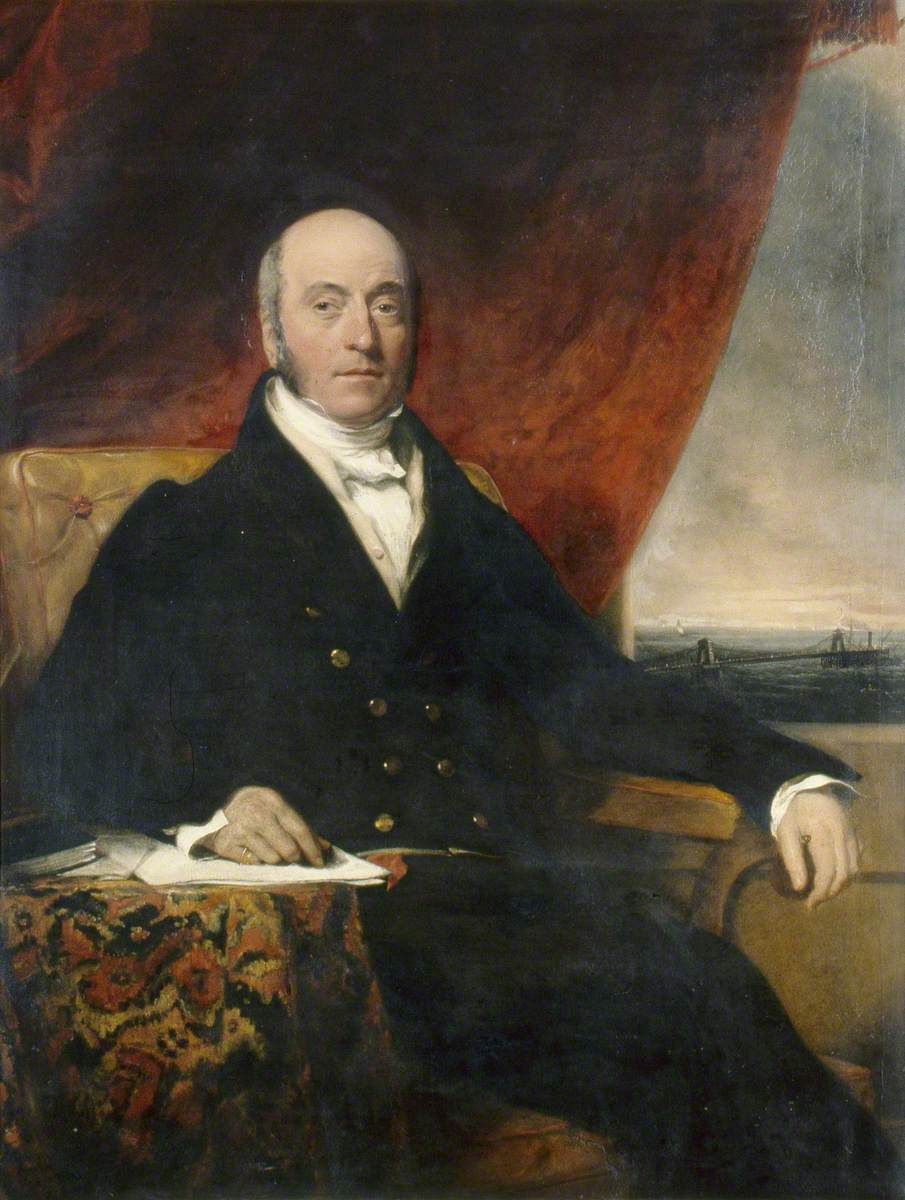
Samuel Brown c. 1823

Captain Sir Samuel Brown of Netherbyres KH FRSE (1776 – 13 March 1852) was an early pioneer of chain design and manufacture and of suspension bridge design and construction. He is best known for the Union Bridge of 1820, the first vehicular suspension bridge in Britain.

== Naval career ==
Brown was born in London, the son of William Brown of Borland, Galloway, Scotland and Charlotte Hogg. He joined the Royal Navy in 1795, serving initially on the Newfoundland and North Sea stations. He served as lieutenant on HMS Royal Sovereign (1803) and in 1805 joined HMS Phoenix as first lieutenant. During his service on Phoenix he took part in the capture of the French frigate Didon. The following year he was appointed to HMS Imperieuse, followed by periods of service aboard HMS Flore and HMS Ulysses.

During his service, he carried out tests on wrought iron chain cables, using them as rigging for HMS Penelope in 1806 on a voyage to the West Indies. This so impressed the Admiralty that on his return in 1808 it immediately ordered four vessels of war to be fitted with chain cables.

In 1808 Brown took out patents for twisted open chain links, joining shackles and swivels. His shackle and swivel designs were scarcely improved on for the next 100 years.

By 1811, he was promoted to commander (in 1842 he accepted the rank of retired captain), and his chains were introduced to hold ships' anchors. He retired from the Navy in May 1812. Just four years later, the Royal Navy standardized on iron chain instead of hemp for all new vessels of war.

== Chain manufacture ==
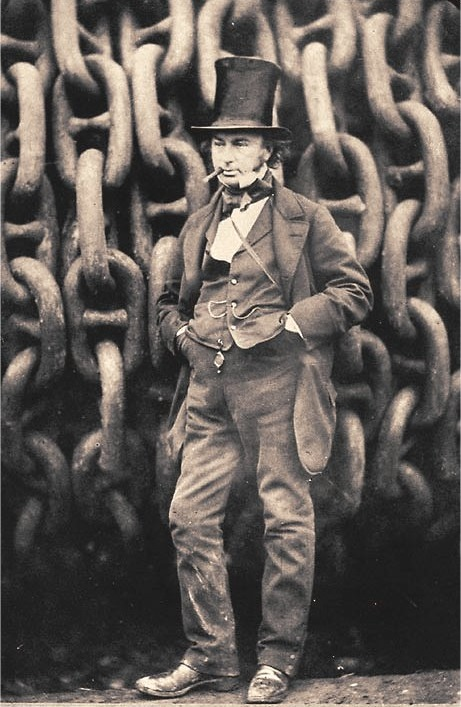
Brunel in front of the chains made at Brown's Pontypridd ironworks for SS Great Eastern.

He established a company (known as Samuel Brown & Co and also Brown Lenox & Co) with his cousin Samuel Lenox, based initially at Millwall in east London from 1812 and then, from 1816 at a larger works (a nail works previously operated by William Crawshay Brown), establishing the Newbridge Chain & Anchor Works (Pontypridd) at Ynysangharad, beside the Glamorganshire Canal, in Pontypridd, south Wales, close to large reserves of iron and coal.

His firm went on to supply all the chain to the Royal Navy until 1916, and made the chains for Brunel's SS Great Eastern, famously photographed by Robert Howlett.

== Bridge building ==
He took out a patent for chain-making in 1816, and patented wrought iron chain links suitable for a suspension bridge in 1817. In the same year, others built Dryburgh Bridge, the first chain-supported bridge in Britain. Brown had been experimenting with a chain-supported suspension bridge already, building a 32m span test structure in 1813.

"When he was thinking about how to build a bridge across the River Tweed, Sir Samuel Brown stopped while observing a spider's web. Right at this time he discovered the suspension bridge." —Charles Bender, 1868.

Brown was also invited to participate in abortive proposals for a suspension bridge at Runcorn. In September 1818, he submitted drawings for Union Bridge over the River Tweed, which was completed in 1820 and survives.

Brown went on to build several further chain bridges, as well as the Trinity Chain Pier in Newhaven, Edinburgh (opened in 1821 and destroyed in a storm in 1898) and the Chain Pier at Brighton (1823–1896). Most of his designs used an unstiffened bridge deck, before it became clear that this form was vulnerable to wind forces and unstable under concentrated loads. His designs were reviewed by eminent engineers including John Rennie and Thomas Telford, and generally approved. Brown's designs were significantly less conservative than his contemporaries, adopting a higher tensile strength for his iron chains.

=== Major bridges ===
- Union Bridge, River Tweed, 1820
- Trinity Chain Pier, Scotland, 1821 (destroyed 1898)
- The Royal Suspension Chain Pier, Brighton, 1823 (destroyed 1896)
- Welney Bridge, Norfolk, 1826 (replaced 1926)
- Hexham Bridge, River Tyne, 1826 (replaced 1903)
- South Esk Bridge, Montrose, 1829 (collapsed in 1830 under crowd loading, killing three, and collapsed again in 1838, oscillating in a hurricane)
- Stockton and Darlington Railway Suspension Bridge, River Tees, 1830 (first railway suspension bridge in the world)
- Wellington Suspension Bridge, Aberdeen, 1830–1831
- Norfolk Suspension Bridge, Shoreham-by-Sea was opened in 1834, designed by Brown and William Tierney Clark. Replaced in 1922.
- Kalemouth Bridge, River Teviot, 1835
- Kenmare Bridge, Ireland, 1840 (demolished 1932)

== Domestic life ==
One of his homes was close to the Brighton project, at 48 Marine Parade, now known as Chain Pier House. In 1827, Brown purchased Netherbyres, a country house near Eyemouth in Berwickshire, south-east Scotland. He had the existing house demolished and a new house built (c.1836), which he later sold on 5 March 1852, days before his death.

On 14 August 1822 Brown married Mary Horne from Edinburgh.

Brown was elected a member of the Royal Society of Edinburgh on 7 February 1831. In 1838, Brown was knighted by Queen Victoria.

He died, aged 75, at Vanbrugh Lodge, Blackheath, London on 13 March 1852 and was buried at West Norwood Cemetery.

== Bibliography ==
- 'Samuel Brown in North-East Scotland', Thomas Day, Industrial Archaeology Review, 1985
- 'The 19th-Century Iron Bridges of Northeast Scotland', Thomas Day, Industrial Archaeology, 1998
- 'Civil Engineering Heritage: Northern England', R.W. Rennison, Thomas Telford Publishing, 1996
- 'Union Chain Bridge – Linking Engineering', Gordon Miller, Proceedings of the Institution of Civil Engineers 159, May 2006, pp 88–95

== See also ==
- Samuel Brown, B. P. Cronin Oxford Dictionary of National Biography, Oxford University Press, 2004
- O'Byrne, William Richard (1849). "Brown, Samuel" . A Naval Biographical Dictionary . John Murray – via Wikisource.
