= Brown Lenox & Co Ltd =

Brown Lenox & Co Ltd was a company that created chains (a chainworks) and anchors, with factories in Millwall and Pontypridd, founded by Samuel Brown and Samuel Lenox.

== Early history ==
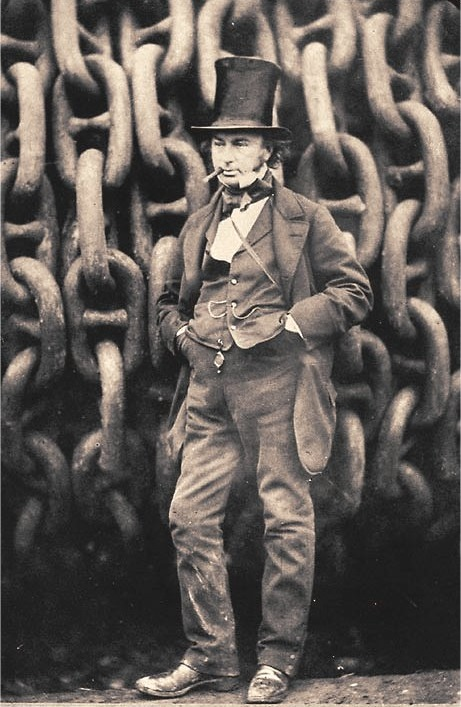
Brunel in front of the chains made at Brown's Pontypridd ironworks for the SS Great Eastern.

The company was started by Samuel Brown, initially called Brown & Co Ltd, following his patent on a stud-linked wrought iron chain that was suitable as a ship's anchor cable, and began manufacturing in 1803. Brown was unable to finance the company alone and so formed a partnership with his cousin Samuel Lenox in 1806, although the company continued to operate under Brown & Co Ltd until 1828 when it was changed to Brown Lenox & Co Ltd. In 1812 a large works was constructed at Millwall, on the river Thames and close to the Royal Dockyard, to meet the high demand. Due to an ever-increasing demand a second works was opened in Pontypridd, then called Newbridge, in South Wales; this was to become the company's main chain works. This site provided easy access to the high quantities of pig iron and coal needed in production. The new factory was established in 1816. Two canal basins were constructed, one for the receipt of raw materials the other for dispatching finished goods. The 20-foot difference between these two basins also allowed the works to be powered entirely through water wheels and turbines. From 1818 the factories also started manufacturing suspension bridge chains.

There is a monument near the site of the Pontypridd factory acknowledging Brown, Lenox & Co Ltd contribution to Marine safety.

== Royal Navy supply contract ==
Royal Navy Captain Samuel Brown carried out tests on the use of iron chains, fitting iron rigging and cables to HMS Penelope for a voyage to the West Indies. On his return in 1808 the Admiralty were impressed by their performance and immediately ordered chains to be fitted to four warships. They awarded annual contracts for chains to Brown Lenox until 1916.

== RMS Titanic ==
It has been claimed that Brown Lenox made the anchor chain for RMS Titanic. Although the patented Brown Lenox Stud link chain design was used, the chain was not made by Brown Lenox & Co Ltd.

== Closure ==
The Pontypridd factory closed in 2000 and was demolished around 2009. A Sainsbury's supermarket now occupies the site, and the retail park it resides in was named after the demolished factory.
