= Royal Suspension Chain Pier =

Pier in Brighton, England

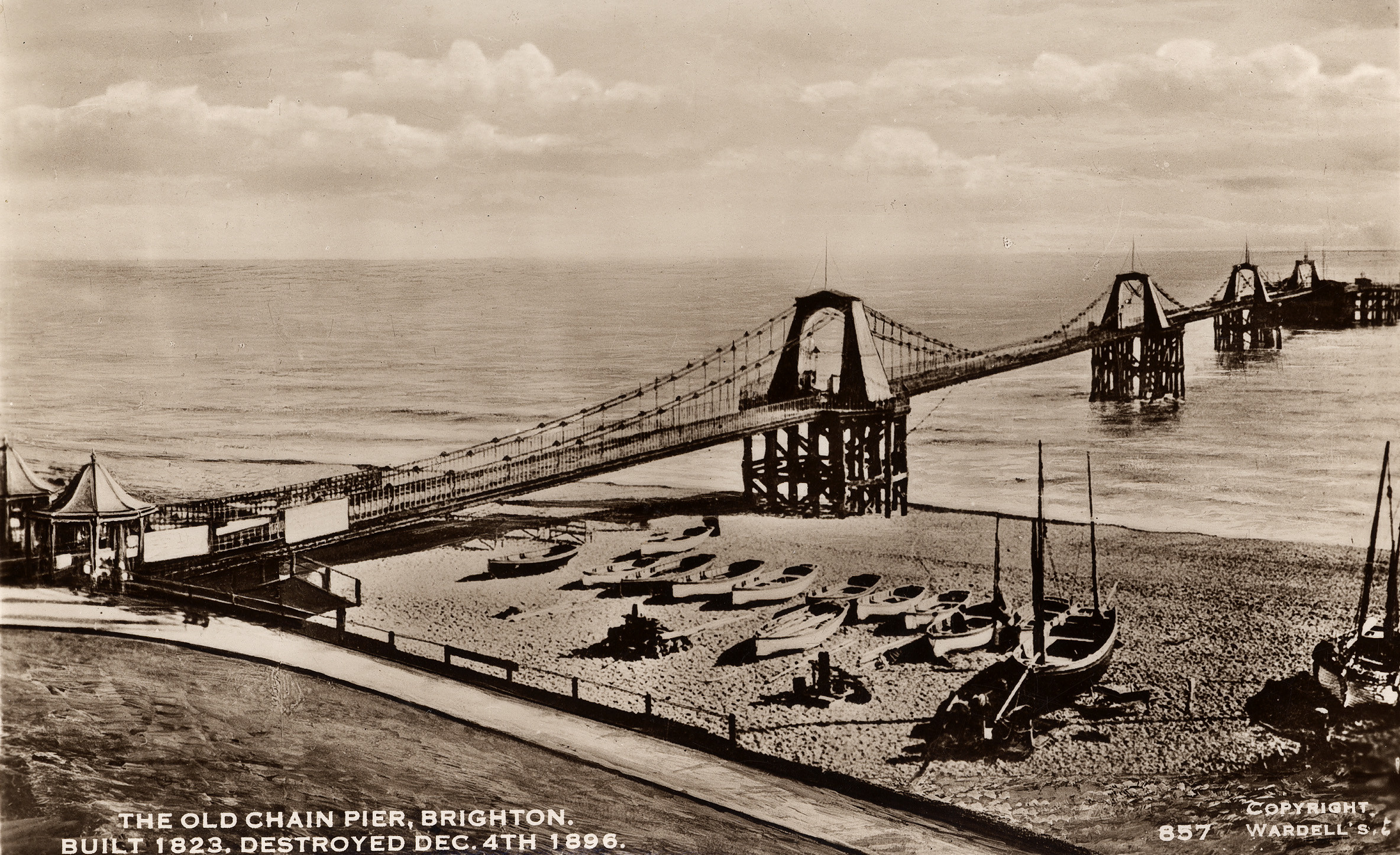
- A postcard of the pier
- Spans: English Channel
- Location: Brighton, England
- Coordinates: 50.818848°N 0.132173°W
- Owner: Brightelmston Suspension Pier Company (before 1889); Brighton Marine Palace and Pier Company (from 1889)
- Operator: Brightelmston Suspension Pier Company

Characteristics
- Total length: 1,134 feet (346 m)
- Width: 13 feet (4.0 m)

History
- Designer: Samuel Brown
- Construction start: 18 September 1822
- Completion date: September 1823
- Opening date: 25 November 1823
- Closure date: October 1896
- Destruction date: 4 December 1896

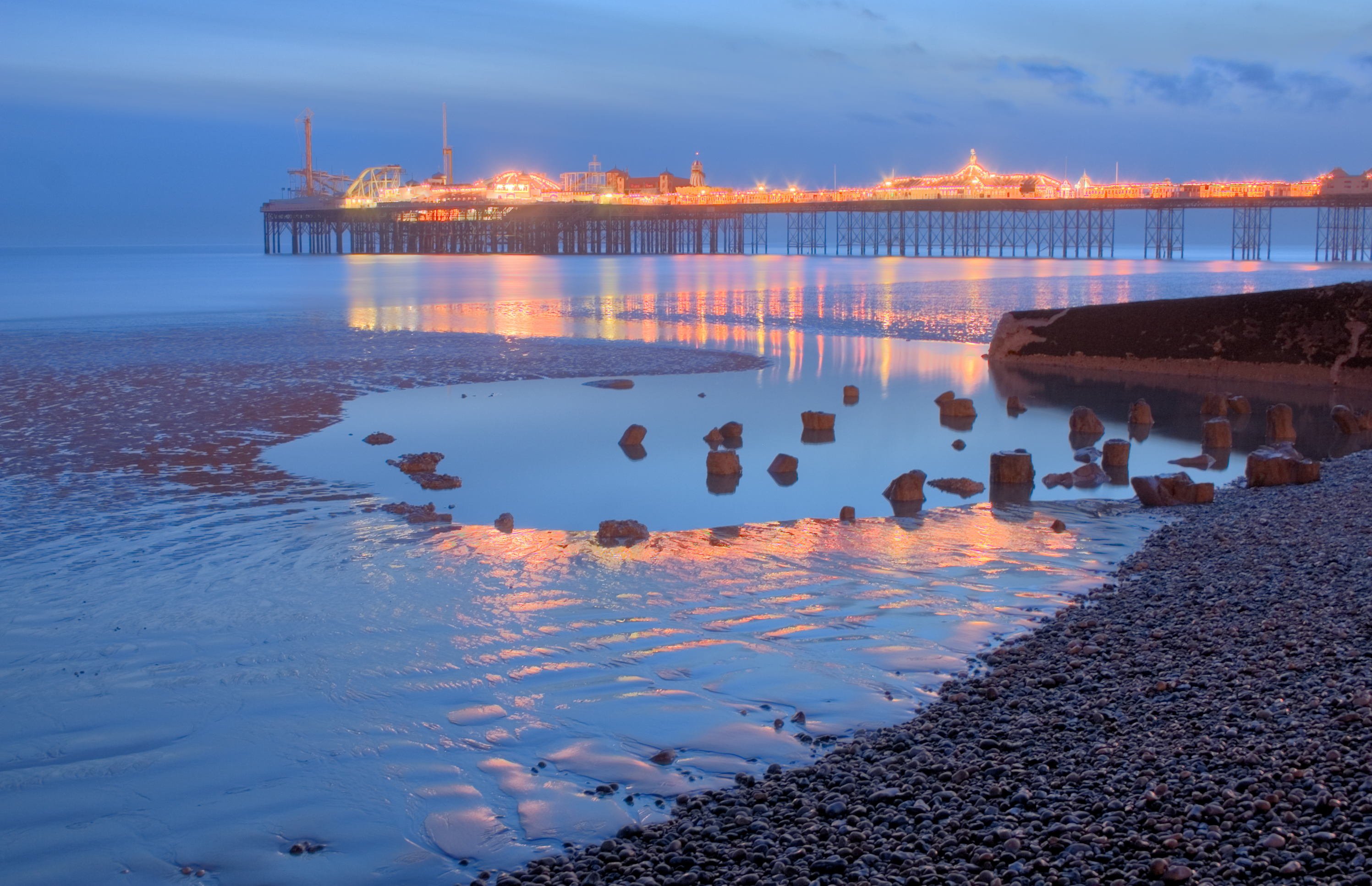
Oak foundation piles of the Royal Suspension Chain Pier Brighton and Brighton Pier in the background in 2010.

The Royal Suspension Chain Pier was the first major pier built in Brighton, England. Opened on 25 November 1823, it was destroyed during a storm on 4 December 1896.

== History ==
Brighthelmston Suspension Pier Act 1822
- Act of Parliament
- Parliament of the United Kingdom
- Long title: An Act for erecting and maintaining a Chain Pier and other Works connected therewith, at the Town of Brighthelmston, in the County of Sussex.
- Citation: 3 Geo. 4. c. cii

Dates
- Royal assent: 5 July 1822

Text of statute as originally enacted

The pier was authorised by the Brighthelmston Suspension Pier Act 1822 (3 Geo. 4. c. cii).

Generally known as the Chain Pier, it was designed by Captain Samuel Brown, with construction starting on 18 September 1822 and completing in September 1823, opening on 25 November 1823. Brown had completed the Trinity Chain Pier in Edinburgh in 1821. The pier was owned and operated by the Brighthelmston Suspension Pier Company, and was primarily intended as a landing stage for packet boats to Dieppe, France, but it also featured a small number of attractions including a camera obscura. An esplanade with an entrance toll-booth controlled access to the pier which was roughly in line with the New Steine. Turner and Constable both made paintings of the pier, King William IV landed on it, and it was even the subject of a song.

The Chain Pier co-existed with the later West Pier, but a condition to build the Palace Pier was that the builders would dismantle the Chain Pier. They were saved this task by a storm that destroyed the already-closed and decrepit pier on 4 December 1896. Some of the debris from the pier damaged the then under-construction Palace Pier and the Daddy Longlegs railway.

The remains of some of the pier's oak piles could be seen at low tides around 2010, however, as of 2021, they are no longer visible. Masonry blocks can still be seen. The signal cannon of the pier is still intact, as are the entrance kiosks which are now used as small shops on the Palace Pier.

== Gallery ==
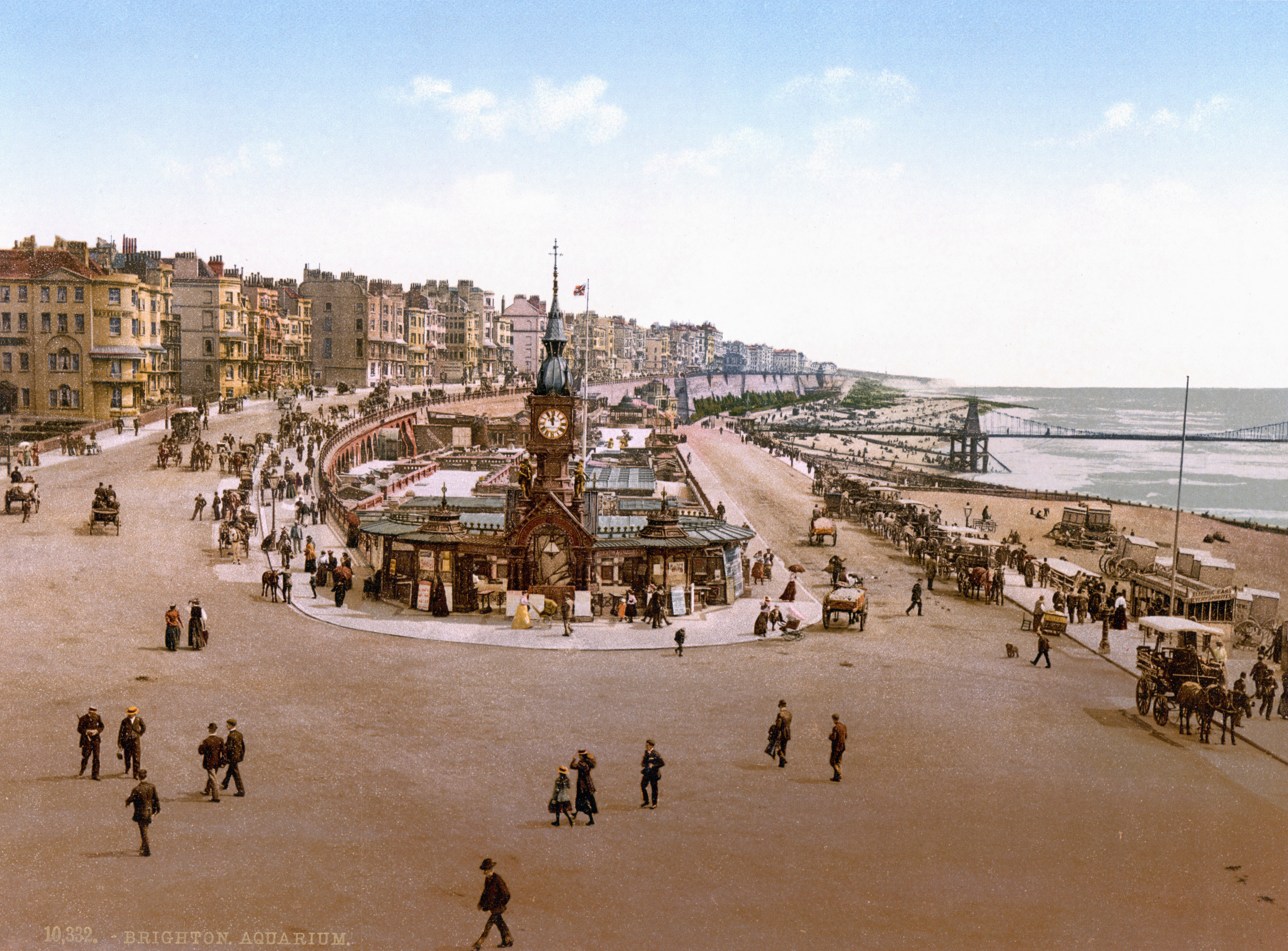
A photochrom of Brighton Aquarium with the pier in the background, originally photographed around 1890

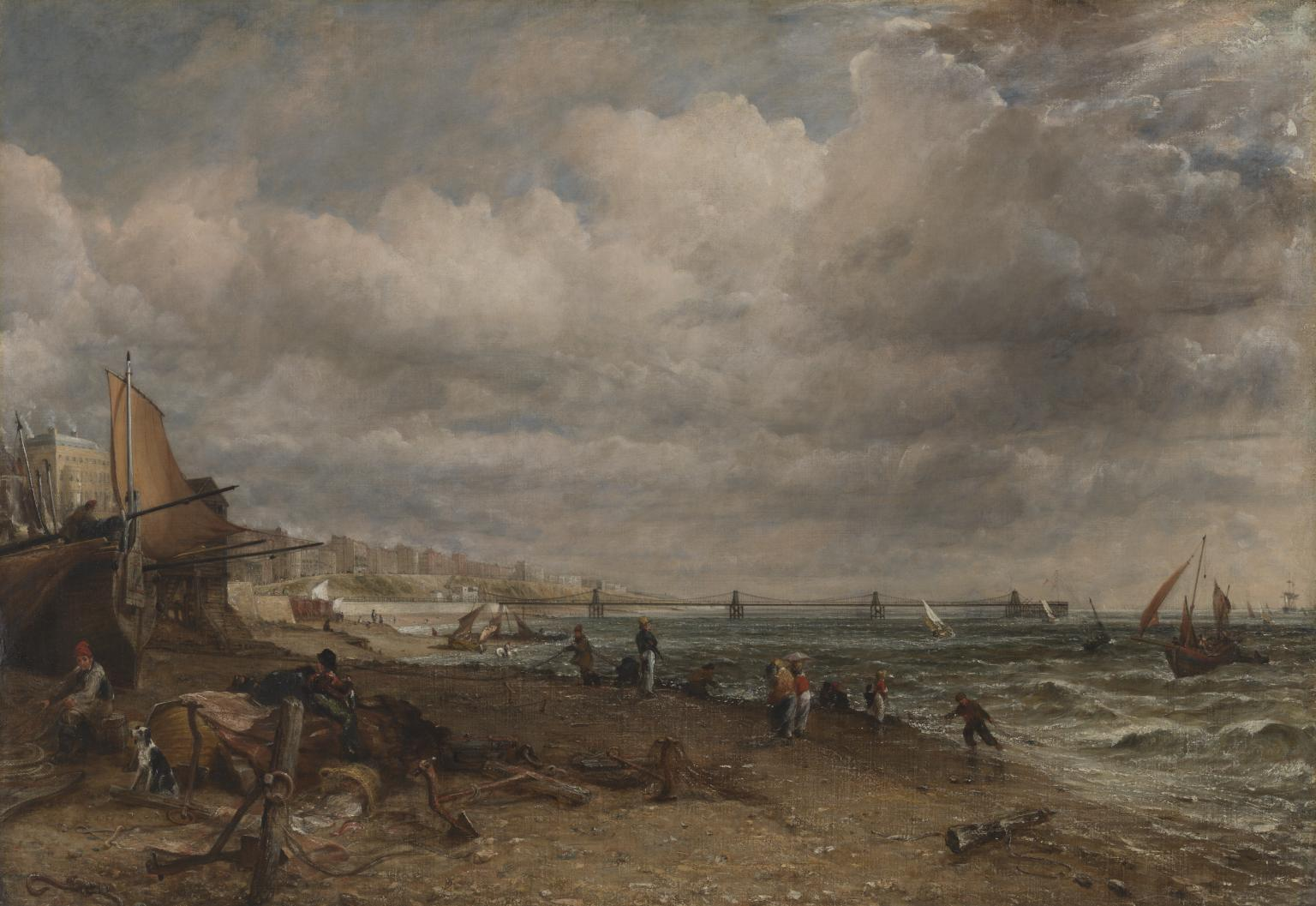
Chain Pier, Brighton by John Constable c.1827. Brighton beach with the Chain Pier in the background.

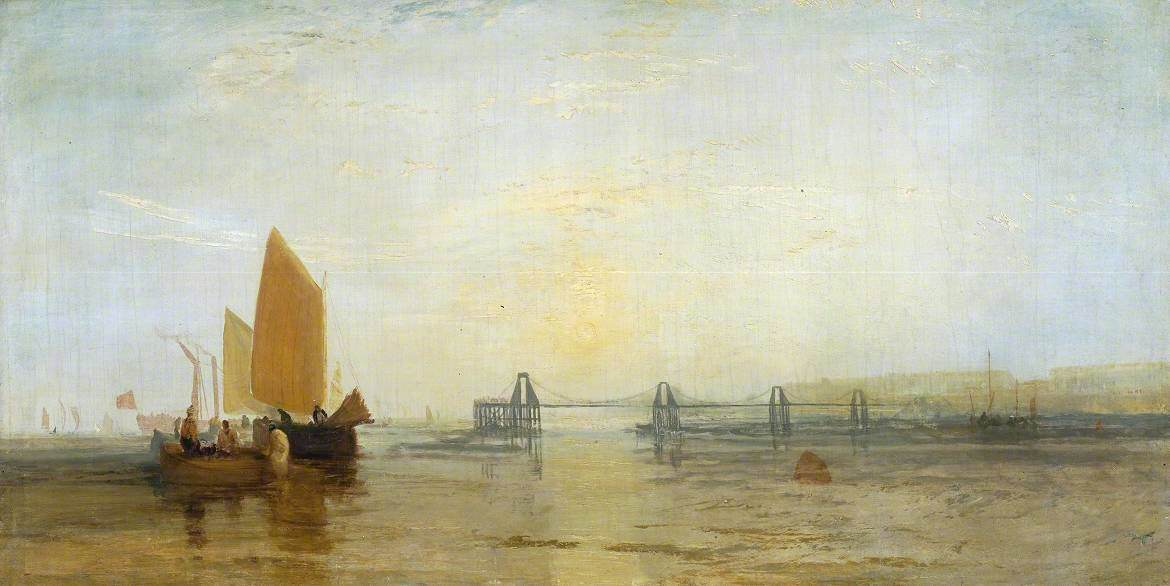
The Chain Pier, Brighton by J. M. W. Turner, 1828

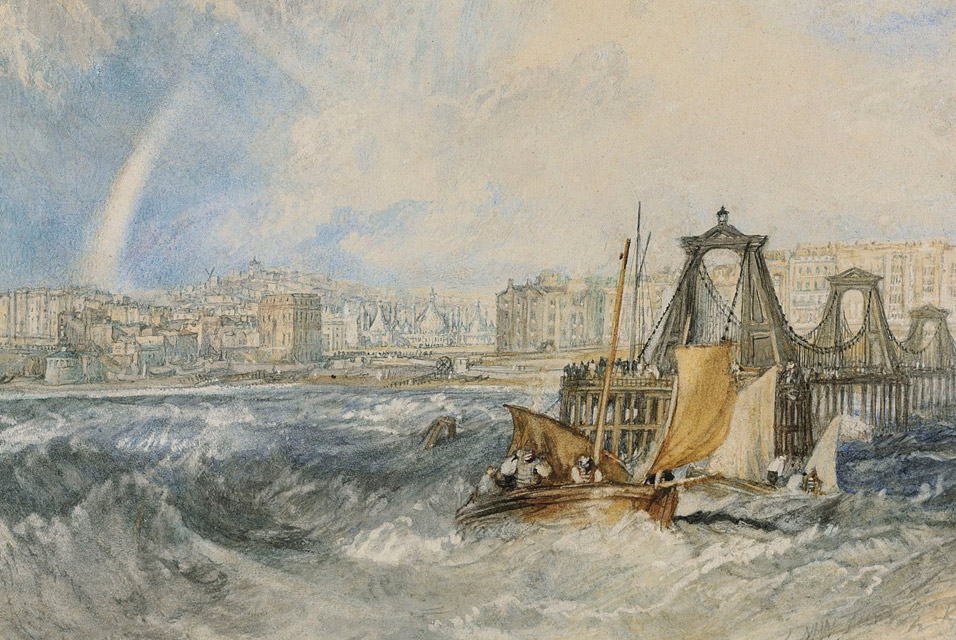
The Chain Pier at Brighton, by J. M. W. Turner

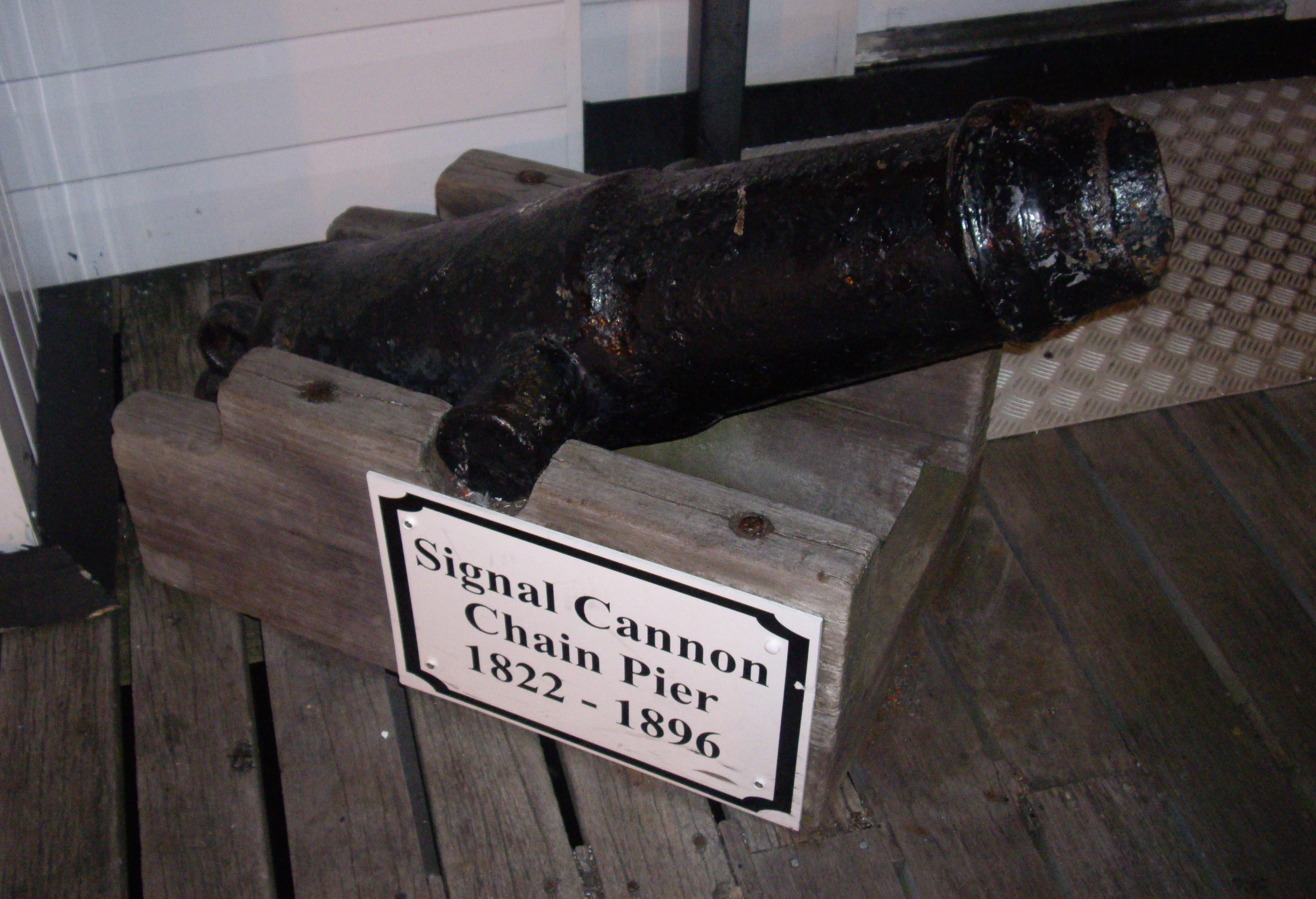
Signal cannon from the Chain Pier, on Palace Pier

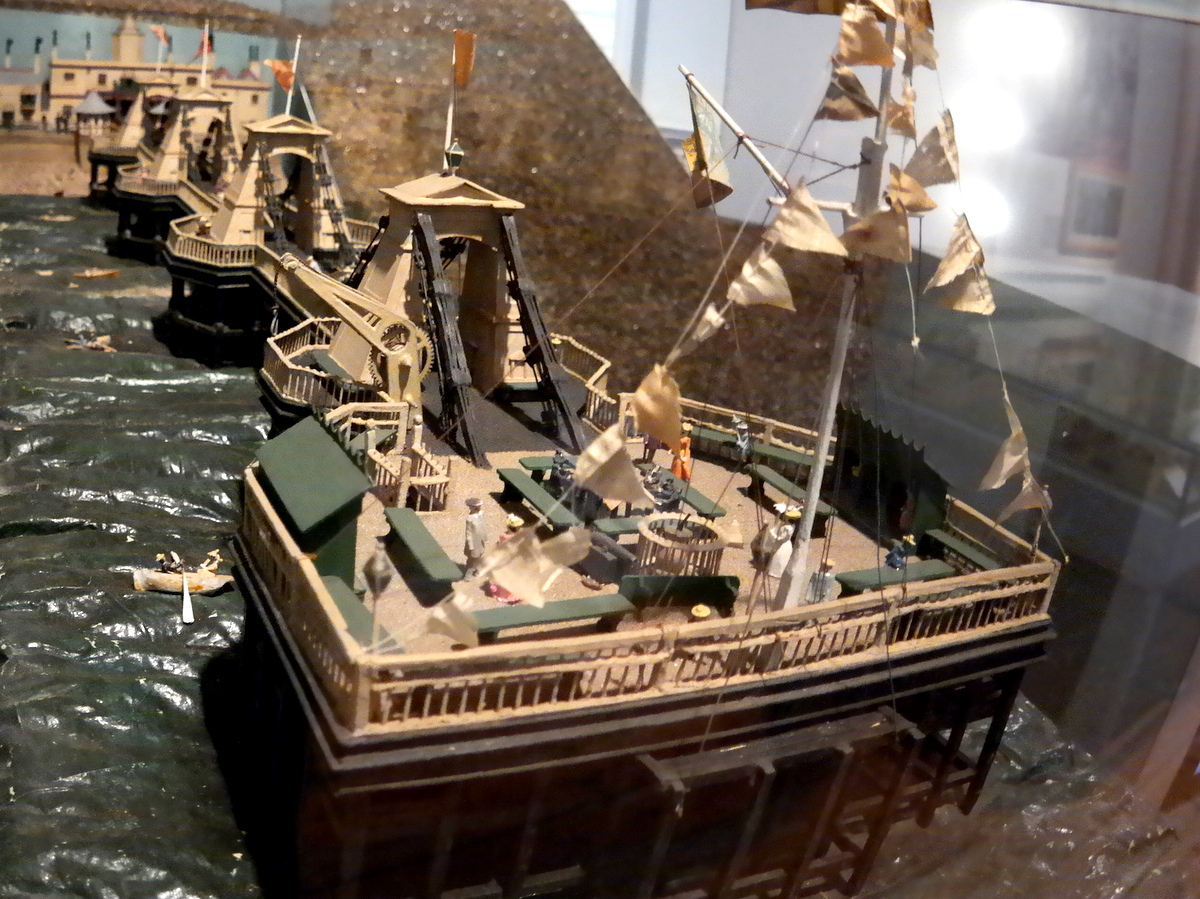
Model of the Royal Suspension Chain Pier on display at Brighton Museum & Art Gallery

== See also ==
- National Piers Society
- List of piers in the United Kingdom
