= Chain Pier, Brighton (painting) =

Painting by John Constable

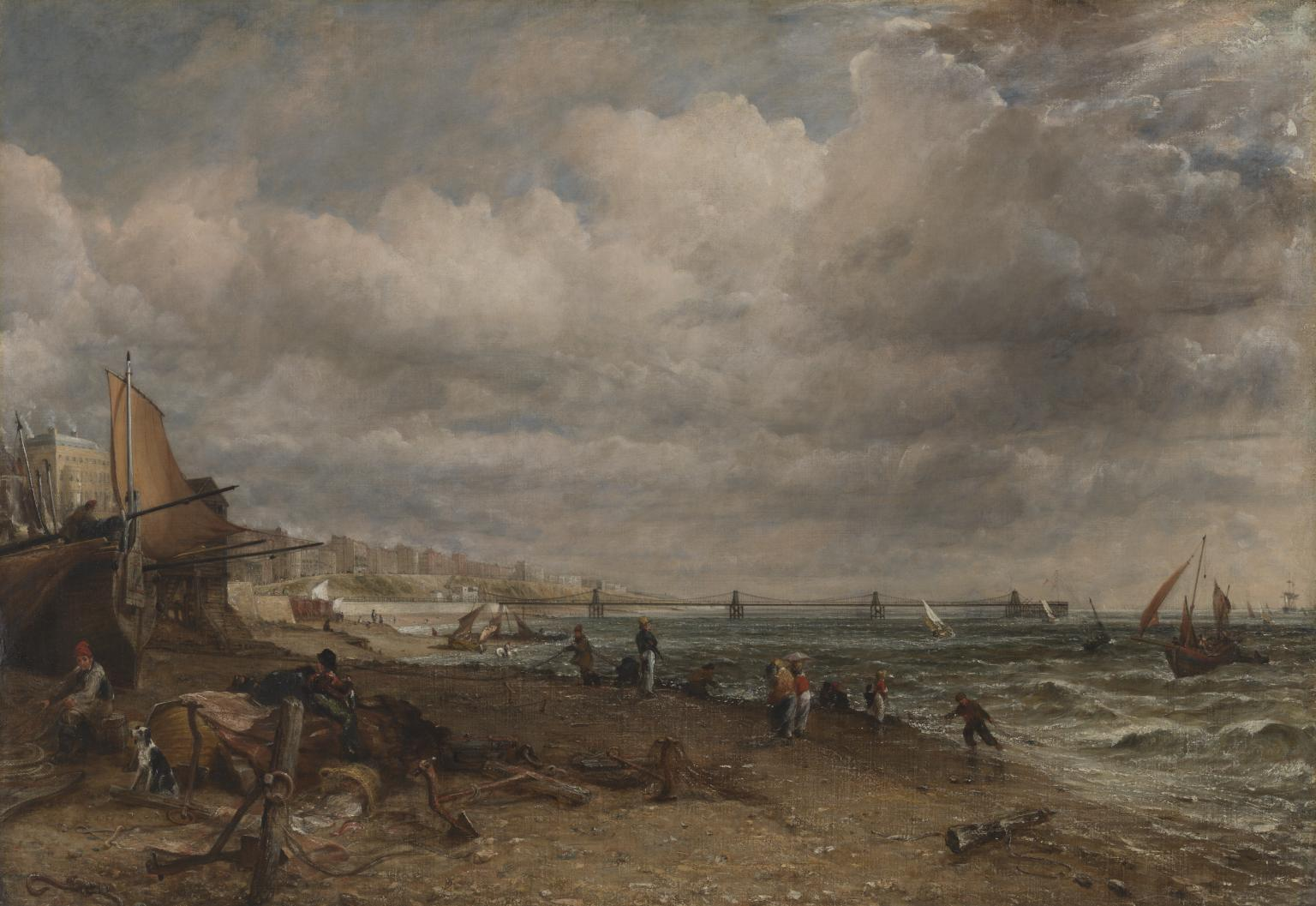
- Artist: John Constable
- Year: 1827
- Type: Oil on canvas, Landscape painting
- Dimensions: 130 cm × 180 cm (50 in × 72 in)
- Location: Tate Britain, London

Chain Pier, Brighton is a landscape painting by the British artist John Constable. One of his "six footers", it was exhibited at the Royal Academy's Summer Exhibition of 1827. It depicts the recently constructed Brighton Chain Pier in the resort town of Brighton on the southern coast of England. The Pier was opened in 1823 and remained a prominent feature of the Brighton seafront until it collapsed in 1896.

It was the largest and most important work from Constable's visits to Brighton where his wife went to recover her health. With a storm about to break it shows the bustling activity on the beach with the new hotels and wealthy residences in the background. Today it is part of the collection of the Tate Britain in London having been purchased in 1950.

== See also ==
- List of paintings by John Constable

== Bibliography ==
- Charles, Victoria. Constable. Parkstone International, 2015.
- Hamilton, James. Constable: A Portrait. Hachette UK, 2022.
- Thornes, John E. John Constable's Skies: A Fusion of Art and Science. A&C Black, 1999.
