= Royal Pier =

Royal Pier may refer to:

- Royal Pier, Southampton
- Royal Pier, Aberystwyth
- Royal Suspension Chain Pier
