= Sea Life Brighton =

SEA LIFE Brighton
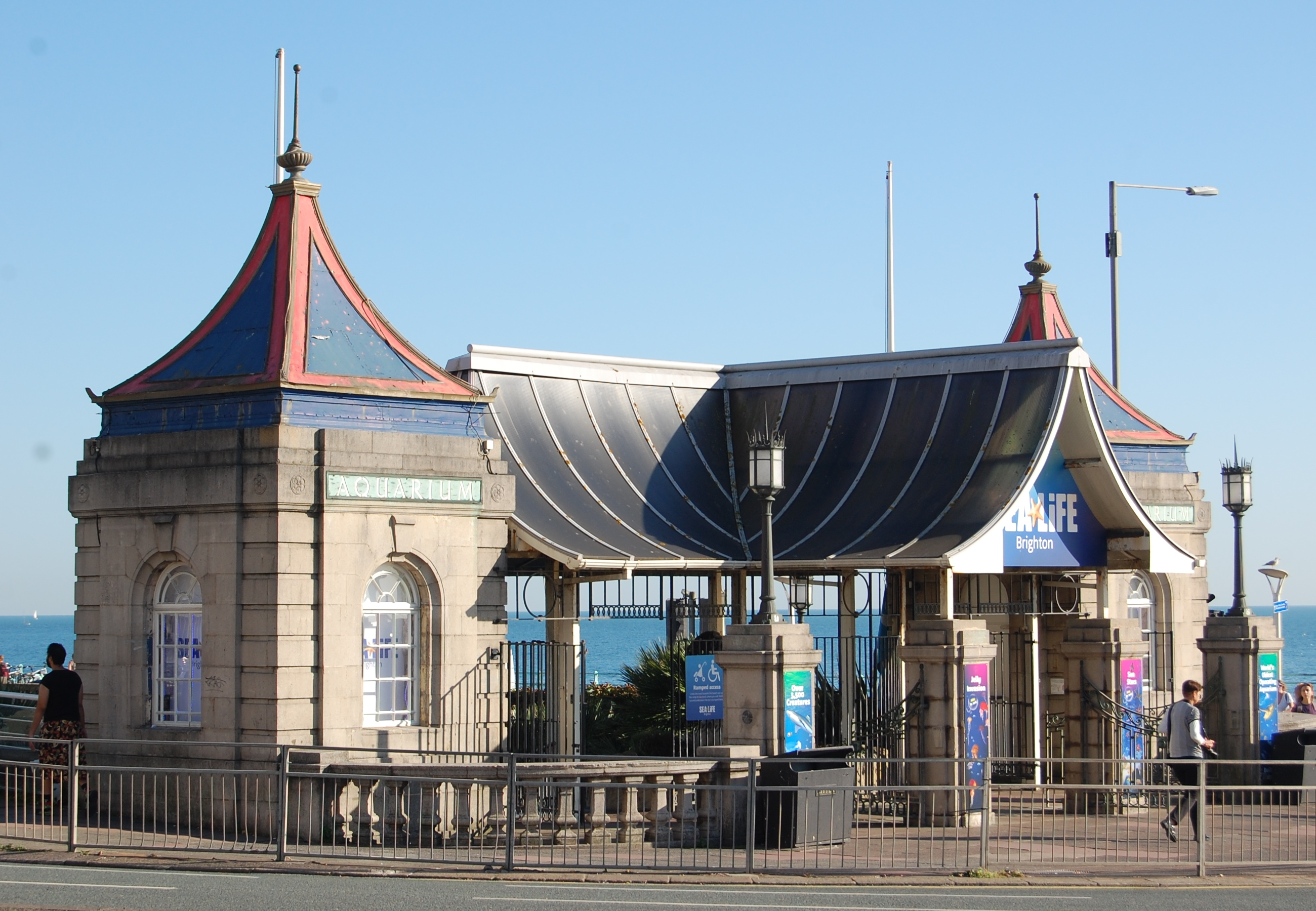
- The entrance viewed from the northwest
- Interactive map of SEA LIFE Brighton
- 50.8196°N 0.1353°W
- Date opened: 1872
- Location: Brighton, United Kingdom
- No. of animals: Over 2,000
- Volume of largest tank: 110,000 gallons
- Website: www.visitsealife.com/Brighton/

SEA LIFE Brighton, known originally as Brighton Aquarium and then from 1969 until 1991 as Brighton Aquarium and Dolphinarium, is an aquarium attraction in Brighton, part of the English seaside city of Brighton and Hove. Opened as Brighton Aquarium in 1872, it is the oldest continuously operating aquarium in the world, and the main tank was the largest in the world at the time. The attraction was bought by SEA LIFE in 1991.

Occupying a prominent position on Brighton seafront, the aquarium was immediately popular among fashionable visitors when it opened and continued to be "one of Brighton's great tourist attractions" for many years afterwards, despite periods of decline. Its exterior was substantially rebuilt in a modern style in the 1920s, and new attractions were added to the roof terrace, but the High Victorian Gothic interior remains. The building was requisitioned during World War II and many changes were made after the war, including the introduction of a motor museum, nightclub, dolphinarium and children's adventure playground; all of these were short-lived. The SEA LIFE chain bought the attraction in 1991 and converted it into a Sea Life Centre. Historic England has listed the building at Grade II for its architectural and historical importance.

== History ==
=== 19th century ===
Brighton Aquarium and Improvements Act 1869
- Act of Parliament
- Parliament of the United Kingdom
- Long title: An Act for re-incorporating and giving additional powers to the Brighton Aquarium Company, and for other purposes.
- Citation: 32 & 33 Vict. c. lxxxviii

Dates
- Royal assent: 12 July 1869
Other legislation
Repealed by	Brighton Corporation Act 1901

Status: Repealed

Text of statute as originally enacted

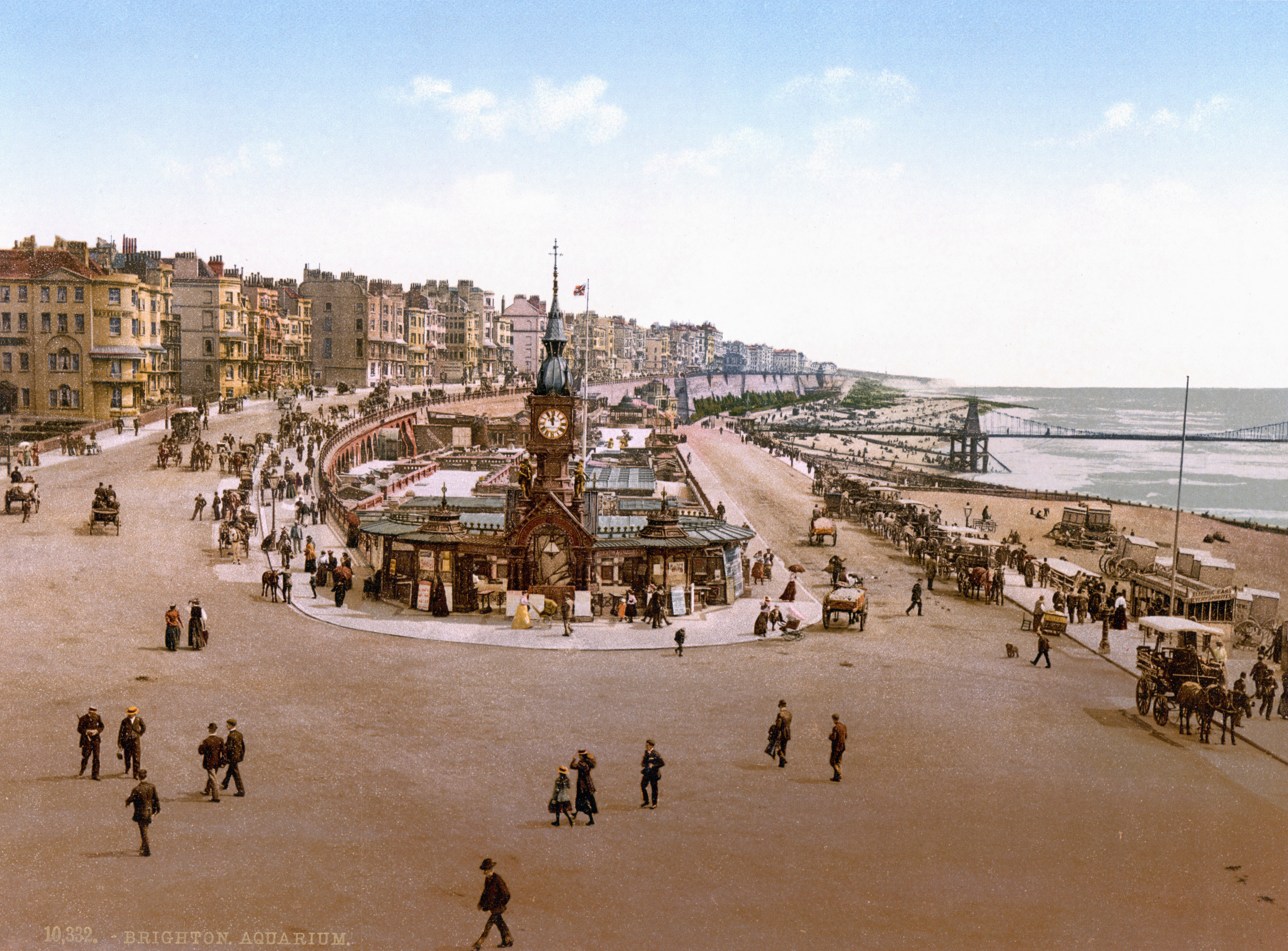
Photochrom of the aquarium as it appeared in the late 19th century, looking east

From the 1850s, architect and civil engineer Eugenius Birch made a career out of designing pleasure piers at British seaside resorts. Prominent among these was the West Pier in Brighton, built between 1863 and 1866. Soon after completing this pier, Birch travelled to Boulogne-sur-Mer in France and visited its aquarium. Around this time, having seen the Great Exhibition in Hyde Park, London, in 1851 and then the aquatic exhibits at The Crystal Palace, many people in Brighton were developing "an interest in the marvels of science", and demand was growing for the town to have an aquarium of its own. After returning from France, Birch developed a plan to build one; it was authorised by the Brighton Aquarium and Improvements Act 1869 (32 & 33 Vict. c. lxxxviii), and work commenced in 1869.

The scheme was "conceived on a grand and audacious scale". Marine Parade, the road running eastwards along the clifftop from central Brighton towards Rottingdean, was to be widened; south of it, land would be reclaimed from the sea and a new seafront road built, leading from Old Steine to Black Rock; and the aquarium would be built in the sloping gap between these roads, extending for about 700 feet (210 m) eastwards from their junction. Behind the new seafront road or promenande (Madeira Drive – initially known as Madeira Road) a new retaining wall had to be built as well. Birch's original design included a series of turret-like structures rising from the roof, to be used as accommodation for staff. When reviewing the plans, though, Borough of Brighton councillors stated that no part of the building should be higher than level with Marine Parade, to prevent views of the sea being interrupted. Other than this, the aquarium was built largely to its original specification. At the west end, on the site of the demolished Royal Suspension Chain Pier's toll-house, was an Italianate-style stone entrance building with steps down to an arched courtyard. From there, a 224-foot (68 m) valuted corridor, lined with water tanks, led into a main hall with a 100-foot (30 m) tank: with a capacity of 110,000 US gallons (420,000 L), it was the world's largest at the time. Beyond were a series of rooms for various entertainment purposes, including a reading-room, a restaurant, a conservatory and a fernery. A roller-skating rink was also provided, catering to the contemporary craze, and concerts and music recitals were a regular feature from the beginning. A cinema, known as the Aquarium Kinema [sic], also operated at the aquarium for a time.

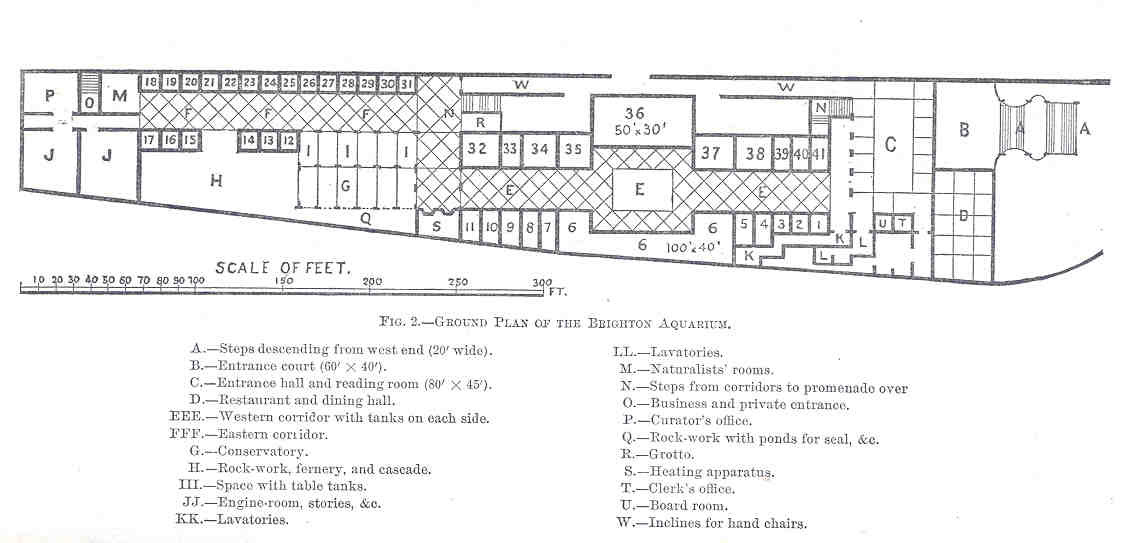
Interior layout of the aquarium in 1884. The main tank, the largest in the world, is marked "E".

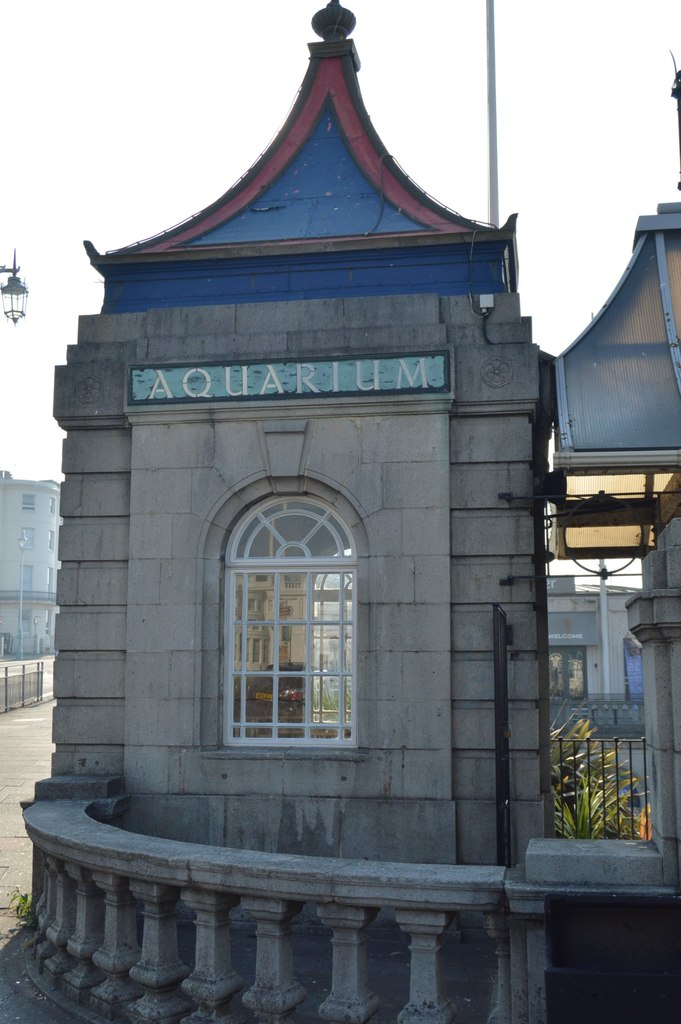
The 1927–29 rebuild included the construction of two entrance kiosks flanking the entrance staircase.

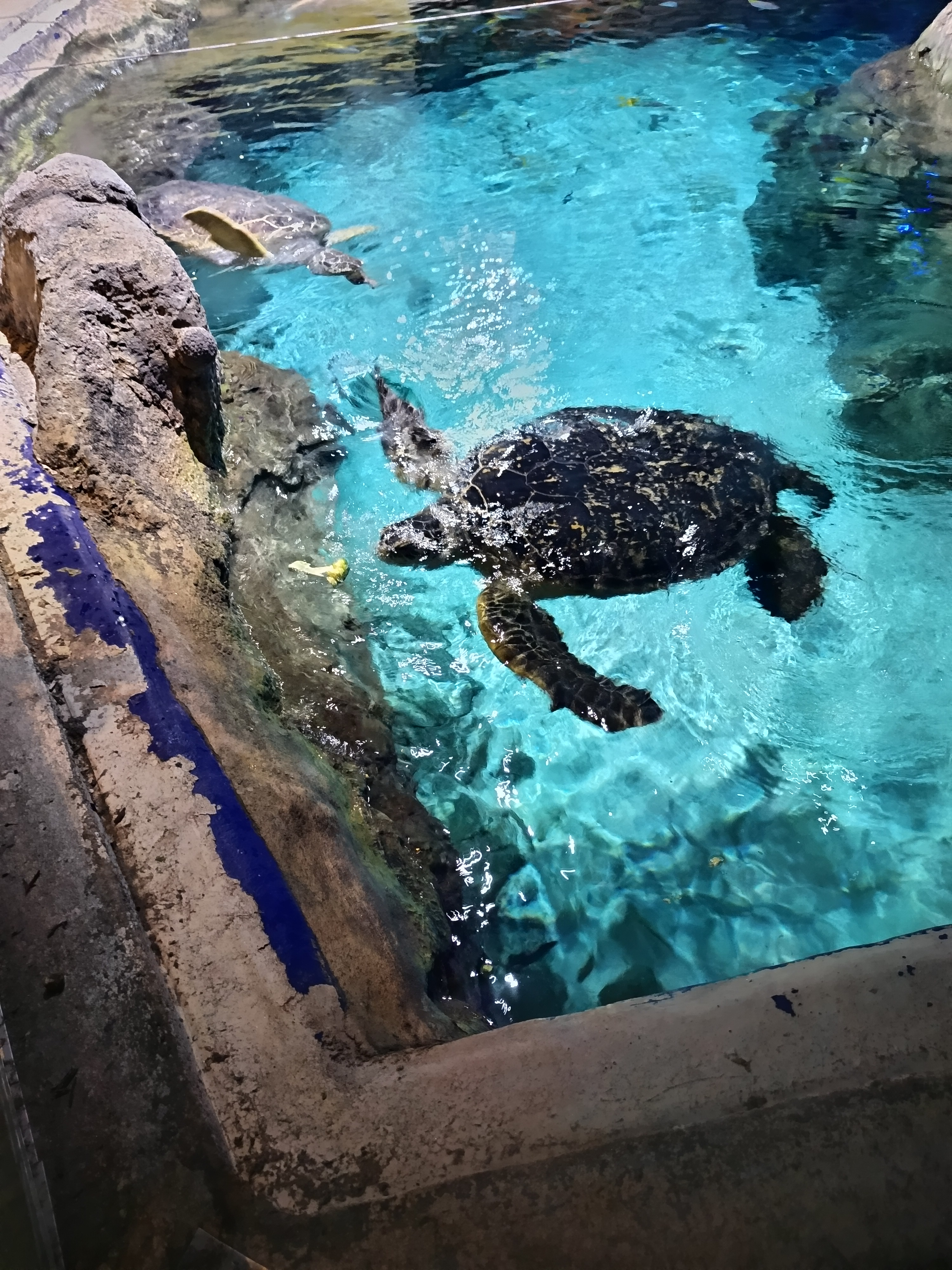
Turtle

The final cost of construction was £130,000. Work continued until 1872, and the aquarium was opened by Prince Arthur, Duke of Connaught and Strathearn on Easter Monday (1 April) that year—although the building was then in a "very unfinished condition", hosting only one tank of fish. A formal opening ceremony took place on 10 August 1872, when Mayor of Brighton John Cordy Burrows officially inaugurated Brighton Aquarium, as it was known. An annual meeting of the British Association for the Advancement of Science was held at the same time, at which naturalist Francis Trevelyan (Frank) Buckland, who had been involved with the Brighton Aquarium Company for some years, "produced, apparently from his pocket, a couple of juvenile alligators" which were added to the aquarium's collection. Other early exhibits included a Norway lobster, a large octopus and a pair of sealions. A dead whale which washed up on Brighton beach was taken into the aquarium and installed as a temporary exhibit on one occasion. Other activities continued to develop as the aquarium "proved to be an instant success with the town's fashionable society": daily organ recitals were supplemented from 1889 by regular plays following the granting of a theatre licence. Czech musician and composer Wilhelm Kuhe was the aquarium's musical director during its early years.

Brighton Aquarium (Capital) Act 1873
- Act of Parliament
- Parliament of the United Kingdom
- Long title: An Act to enable the Brighton Aquarium Company to raise additional Capital.
- Citation: 36 & 37 Vict. c. xxvi

Dates
- Royal assent: 15 May 1873
Other legislation
Repealed by	Brighton Corporation Act 1901

Status: Repealed

Brighton Aquarium (Capital) Act 1878
- Act of Parliament
- Parliament of the United Kingdom
- Long title: An Act to enable the Brighton Aquarium Company to raise additional Capital.
- Citation: 41 & 42 Vict. c. ii

Dates
- Royal assent: 28 March 1878
Other legislation
Repealed by	Brighton Corporation Act 1901

Status: Repealed

Text of statute as originally enacted

A roof terrace was added in 1874 and extended by 180 feet (55 m) two years later. It had a garden, café and smoking room, among other things. The entrance façade was also altered in 1874, when a cast iron structure topped by a clock tower was added on Marine Parade: this work was undertaken by T. Boxall. In August 1883 local inventor Magnus Volk opened the first section of what became Volk's Electric Railway along the seafront, with its western terminus outside the Aquarium.

=== Early 20th century and corporation ownership ===
Brighton Corporation Act 1901
- Act of Parliament
- Parliament of the United Kingdom
- Long title: An Act to empower the Mayor Aldermen and Burgesses of the County Borough of Brighton to purchase the Brighton Aquarium and for other purposes.
- Citation: 1 Edw. 7. c. ccxxiv

Dates
- Royal assent: 9 August 1901
Other legislation
Repealed by	Brighton Corporation Act 1931

Status: Repealed

Brighton's fortunes declined around the turn of the 20th century, and the aquarium was badly affected. It encountered financial difficulties, and was threatened with closure in 1901. Brighton Corporation bought it for £30,000 under the Brighton Corporation Act 1901 (1 Edw. 7. c. ccxxiv), and undertook several improvements, including building a winter garden and increasing the range of exhibits. Within a few years it had one of the largest and widest ranging collections of marine life of any European aquarium, and it resumed its position as one of the town's most important attractions. The corporation planned a larger series of improvements, but World War I interrupted this. A closure threat was averted in 1922, when the corporation initially granted and then withdrew permission for the Southdown Motor Services bus company to take over the building and turn it into a bus station; and work to enhance the aquarium eventually started in 1927 and continued until 1929. The corporation spent £117,000 on rebuilding the exterior of the aquarium in a contemporary style with extensive use of white stone. Boxall's iron entrance structure was demolished, although the clock was retained and was placed in a small tower above the entrance to the nearby Palace Pier, where it remains. The winter garden was replaced with a new concert hall, a bandstand and another restaurant were built on the roof terrace, and the equipment used to pump and cleanse the water in the tanks was improved and modernised. Other than this, very few changes were made inside. David Edwards, the Brighton Borough Surveyor, undertook this work. The roof terrace was redesignated as a "sun terrace", and it was initially provided with a large cricket scoreboard sponsored by Johnnie Walker whisky, on which scores from Test matches and other major cricket matches would be updated regularly. The aquarium was ceremonially reopened by the Duke of York (later George VI) on 12 June 1929 after a two-year closure. The aquarium now extended all the way to Madeira Terrace. Further enhancements in the 1930s included the provision of a miniature rifle range, public baths, and a lift from Marine Parade.

=== World War II and decline ===
During World War II the aquarium was taken over by the Royal Air Force; it was damaged and became run down. Brighton Corporation took possession again after the war but in 1955 leased the aquarium to a newly formed private company. Restrictions were placed on the forms of entertainment that could be provided, but the aquarium became more downmarket and suffered from structural neglect, with damp penetration and the loss of interior details through being covered up or overpainted. The 1,250-capacity concert hall which had replaced the winter garden in 1929 was converted into a nightclub, the Florida Rooms. A few years later, in 1961, a motor museum in connection with the Montagu collection was added.

=== The Florida Rooms ===
The Florida Rooms was a live music venue and nightclub on the premises. It operated from the late 1950s until 1967 when it was closed to make way for the salt water pool needed for the dolphinarium. The Florida Rooms hosted jazz bands from the 1950s and became one of the first British R&B clubs in the 1960s. Among the jazz musicians appearing regularly at the venue were Chris Barber and Acker Bilk. The High Numbers (an early incarnation of The Who) played an early gig there and The Who were to become regulars at the venue, at one point playing every Wednesday night for an entrance fee of 1s.6d. In 1965, Davy Jones and the Lower Third, fronted by a very young David Bowie, appeared there. By the mid-1960s, the club had settled into regular weekend nights. Friday was Blues night and the club hosted, among others, Memphis Slim, John Lee Hooker and Jimmy Witherspoon. Saturday was the day for the top chart acts of the time. Artists appearing on the Saturday night slot included The Animals, Manfred Mann, Georgie Fame and John Mayall's Bluesbrakers.

=== Dolphinarium to Sea Life Centre ===
When a pair of dolphins were introduced at the aquarium in 1968, they became a popular attraction and in 1969 a permanent dolphinarium was set up in the former motor museum. A 210,000-US-gallon (790,000 L) saltwater pool was installed, along with seating for 1,000 people, and the aquarium's name was changed to Brighton Aquarium and Dolphinarium. The public baths were closed in 1979, and by the early 1980s a funfair, amusement arcade and miniature railway were operating on the former roof terrace. In 1987 part of the building was converted into Pirates Deep, a children's adventure playground. In the 1980s, concern over the welfare of dolphins resulted in public pressure to close the dolphinarium, and in November 1990 it was announced that the Sea Life group would take over the aquarium in 1991 and convert it into a Sea Life Centre. The last two bottlenose dolphins in the aquarium were Missie (since 1969) and Silver (since 1978). These dolphins were released into the wild in 1991 as part of Operation Into The Blue, after rehabilitation at a conch farm in the Turks and Caicos Islands.

After taking over the aquarium, Sea Life undertook a £1.5 million restoration project. More work was done in 2012: the centre was closed for a time to allow the interior to be fully restored to its 19th-century style.

In the late 1990s the Aquarium's former roof terrace, which is still owned by the local council, was redeveloped into multiple commercial units, but these failed to attract many occupants. A Harvester restaurant occupies some of the space, but a Burger King restaurant stayed only until 2010. In the same year, a gym was given permission to open in a unit where a nightclub operating under the Cream brand had previously been proposed. In another part of the building, a private members' club, part of the Soho House chain, was proposed in 2014 and was given permission to open in April 2016. Rebuilding work at Sea Life Brighton delayed the redevelopment and demolition work needed (including of a large circular building which previously housed The Terraces restaurant), but in December 2017 it was announced that work would start in early 2018. An extension to its licencing hours was sought in 2022, when it was stated that the club could hold 500 people and had a separate 300-capacity shared workspace.

Brighton Aquarium is the oldest aquarium in continuous operation in the world.

== Architecture ==
Under the name The Brighton Aquarium and attached walls, piers, railings and lamps, the aquarium was listed at Grade II by English Heritage on 19 August 1971. This status is given to "nationally important buildings of special interest". As of February 2001, it was one of 1,124 Grade II-listed buildings and structures, and 1,218 listed buildings of all grades, in the city of Brighton and Hove.

As originally built, the entrance to the aquarium was at the east end, but it was moved to the west end in 1874 when the "attention-seeking clock tower" structure was added. This new entrance structure, added in 1874 by T. Boxall and removed during the 1920s remodelling, consisted of an elaborate cast iron gateway with paired columns and arches set below gables, topped with a tall clock tower. Set at each corner of the entrance was a statue representing one of the four seasons. These were cast in bronze and designed and manufactured in Paris by the firm of Messrs Barbezat. Laidlaw and Sons of Glasgow were responsible for the ironwork. Behind this, down a flight of shallow steps, was the Italianate entrance court, designed to resemble structures in ancient Rome (it has been described as the "Pompeian style"). On its frieze was a quote from the Book of Genesis: "And God said, 'Let the water bring forth abundantly the moving creatures that hath life'". The walls were of stone.

The present exterior appearance is attributable to the 1920s rebuilding by David Edwards. The entrance and its surrounding structures are of white artificial stone in the Louis XVI style. This architectural style, a derivative of Neoclassical architecture, can also be seen in Brighton at the Post and Telegraph pub (formerly the National Provincial Bank) on North Street, another 1920s building. The style has also been classed as Regency Revival. Two kiosk-type structures with tented metal roofs flank a staircase leading to a sunken plaza. Arched entrances lead to the interior. Above, a balustrade runs around the former roof garden, forming a parapet. The structures which replaced the old roof garden were designed in 1998 by the Colman Partnership in a "stripped-down Regency style". The complex now extends about 900 feet (270 m) eastwards along Madeira Drive as a result of successive extensions.

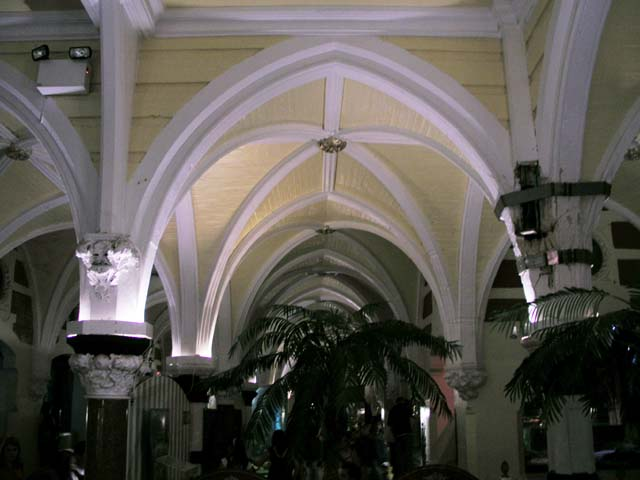
The ceiling has quadripartite vaults

Inside, much of the original High Victorian Gothic architecture survives. The main hall in the centre, where the largest tank can be found, has two seven-bay aisles leading from it, with subsidiary tanks on the side walls. The easternmost aisle is articulated on the exterior by a seven-bay arcade with pilasters of the Tuscan order; the dolphinarium was entered through this section when it was operating. The aisles have deep quadripartite roof vaults. The columns are of green serpentine marble, granite from Edinburgh and Bath stone, and their capitals are carved with representations of sea creatures designed by H.R. Pinker. Architect and architectural historian Harry Stuart Goodhart-Rendel, who lived locally, admired the interior decoration: he said "I have never heard justice done to the adroit detail of those strange Victorian galleries from which Victorian children [...] gazed with awe upon the wonders of the deep". The extensive vaulting, and the aquarium's position set below the cliff and reached down a flight of steps, meant the interior was likened in contemporary accounts to an "undersea cathedral" and a "vast underground extravaganza".

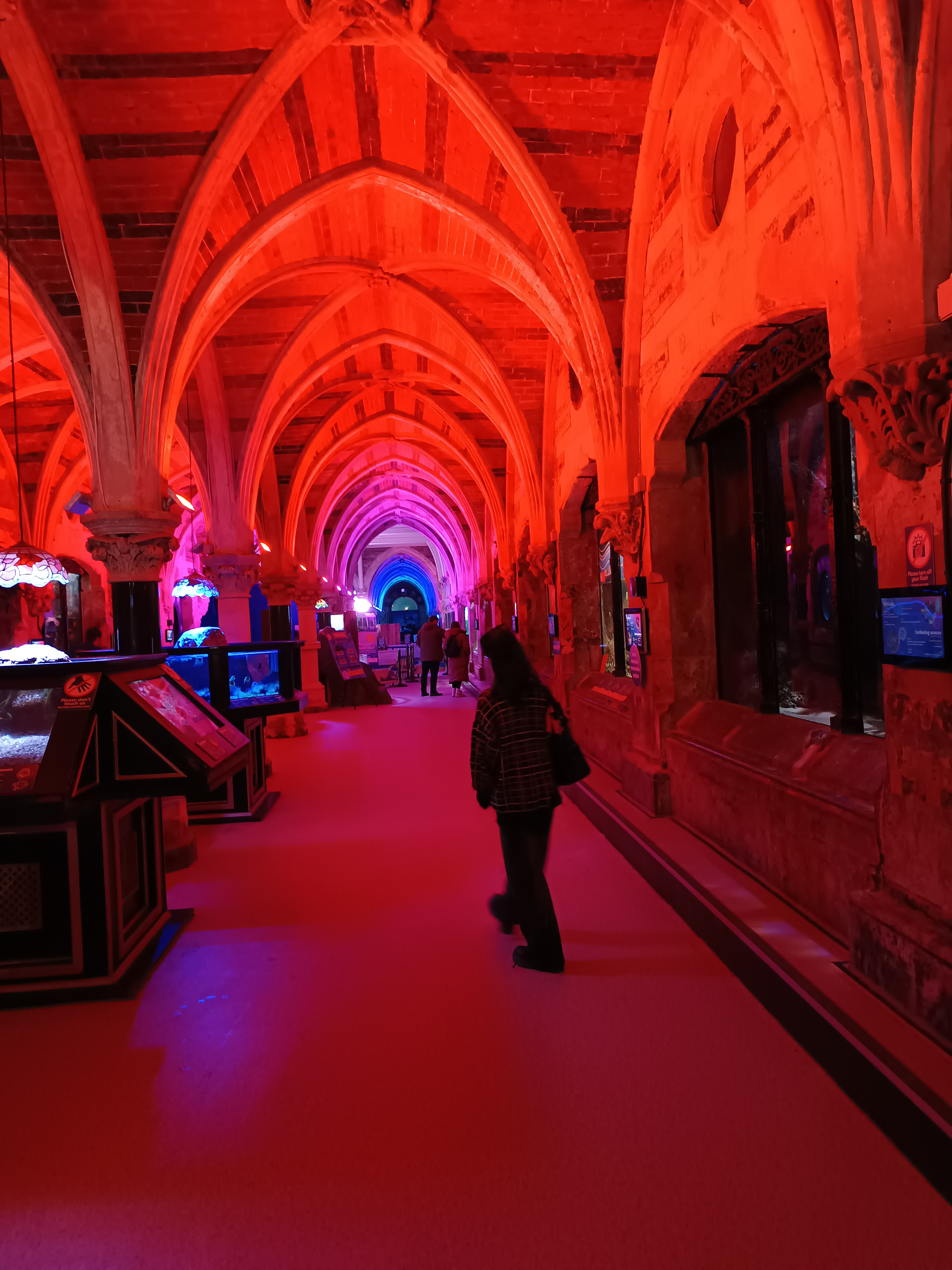
Lighting scheme

As originally designed, the conservatory was 160 feet (49 m) long and had a glazed roof. All the rocks were made of Pulhamite, an artificial stone made by James Pulham and Son; this could be sculpted into natural-looking features. Water features in this section included a waterfall and a stream used to demonstrate the breeding of fish.

== Transport ==
Bus stops named "Brighton Sea Life Centre", situated on Marine Parade, are served by regular buses on various eastbound and westbound routes.

== See also ==
- Grade II listed buildings in Brighton and Hove: A–B
- Media related to Brighton Sea Life Centre, Madeira Drive, Brighton at Wikimedia Commons

== Bibliography ==
- Antram, Nicholas; Morrice, Richard (2008). Brighton and Hove. Pevsner Architectural Guides. London: Yale University Press. ISBN 978-0-300-12661-7.
- Arscott, David (2009). Brighton: A Very Peculiar History. Brighton: The Salariya Book Co. Ltd. ISBN 978-1-906714-89-5.
- Beevers, David; Roles, John (1993). A Pictorial History of Brighton. Derby: The Breedon Books Publishing Co. Ltd. ISBN 1-873626-54-1.
- Carder, Timothy (1990). The Encyclopaedia of Brighton. Lewes: East Sussex County Libraries. ISBN 0-861-47315-9.
- Fines, Ken (2002). A History of Brighton & Hove. Chichester: Phillimore & Co. ISBN 1-86077-231-5. (pp93–94)
- Musgrave, Clifford (1981). Life in Brighton. Rochester: Rochester Press. ISBN 0-571-09285-3.
- Sampson, Mark (1994). Brighton: History and Guide. Stroud: Alan Sutton Publishing. ISBN 0-7509-0476-3.
- Seldon, Anthony (2002). Brave New City: Brighton & Hove Past, Present, Future. Lewes: Pomegranate Press. ISBN 0-9542587-1-1.
- Underwood, Eric (1978). Brighton. London: B.T. Batsford Ltd. ISBN 0-7134-0895-2.
- Wales, Tony (1997). Brighton. The Archive Photographs Series. Chalford: Chalford Publishing Co. ISBN 0-7524-0755-4.
