= Eugenius Birch =

English seaside architect (1818–1884)

- Born: 20 June 1818; Shoreditch, Middlesex, England
- Died: 8 January 1884 (aged 65); London, England
- Resting place: Highgate Cemetery
- Occupation: Architect
- Awards: Telford Medal
- Buildings: West Pier; Eastbourne Pier; Brighton Aquarium; Scarborough Aquarium
- Projects: East Indian Railway
- Design: Promenade piers

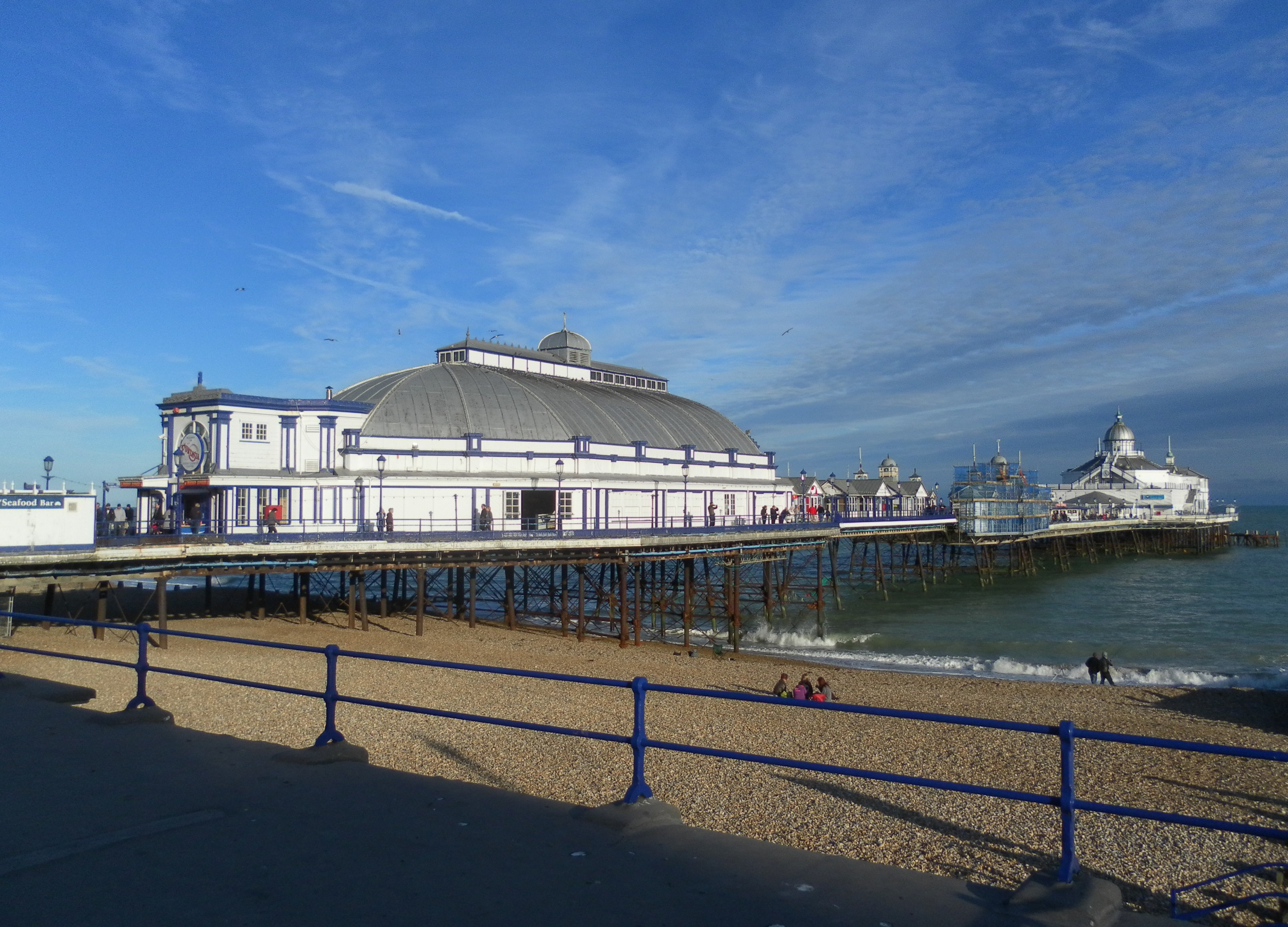
The Grade II*-listed Eastbourne Pier, designed in 1870 by Eugenius Birch.

Eugenius Birch (20 June 1818 – 8 January 1884) was a 19th-century English seaside architect, civil engineer and noted builder of promenade-piers and two large aquaria.

== Biography ==
Both Eugenius and his elder brother, John Brannis (1813–1862), were born in Gloucester Terrace (later Pitfield Street), Shoreditch, London to John and his wife, Susanne. John was an architect and a surveyor according to the Obituary of Eugenius Birch, while according to Oxford Dictionary of National Biography he was a corn dealer. He attended schools in Brighton and at Euston Square. Fascinated by engineering from a young age, he would often visit major engineering works being built in north London (such as the Primrose Hill Tunnel). While still a boy he submitted a design for a passenger carriage to the London and Greenwich Railway company. His innovation, to place the wheels beneath the carriage as opposed to the side, thus freeing more room for the passengers was adopted by the railway.

=== Career ===
As a result of the success in getting his idea adopted at aged 16 he was able to join Messrs. Bligh's engineering works in Limehouse, London as an apprentice, and then studied at the Mechanics' Institute at the request of Dr George Birkbeck. In 1837, aged 19, he received a silver Isis Medal from the Society of Arts for his drawing of a marine steam engine.

In 1838, when the Institution of Civil Engineers was allowed to make drawings of Joseph Huddart's Rope Machinery by its owner, Cotton, Birch and George Drysdale Dempsey took the drawings and wrote manuscript accounts. Both communications were accurate and it was difficult to distinguish between their merits, therefore both men were awarded a Telford medal in silver, accompanied by books to the value of five guineas.

On 19 February 1839, Birch was elected a Graduate of the Institution of Civil Engineers, becoming a member on 5 May 1863. Meanwhile, John Brannis was elected a Graduate of the Institution of Civil Engineers in 1842, the brothers formed a general design engineering partnership in 1843. Birch worked across various projects including railways (such as the East Indian Railway from Calcutta to Delhi), viaducts and bridges including the Kelham and Stockwith bridges. Kelham Bridge was a screw-piled bridge whose construction started in 1849. But in March 1855, it was destroyed by the collision between piles and an immense sheet of ice, after locals broke the ice around the bridge.

He also designed the Devon and Somerset Railway, Exmouth docks, Ilfracombe harbour, West Surrey waterworks and Brighton Aquarium, the oldest operational aquarium in the world.

=== Piers ===
On his return to England from India, Birch applied his global experiences to the developing trend of seaside holidays in England, specifically the construction of piers. With the railways now allowing easy and cheap access to the seaside, and the known health benefits of clean air, businessmen in coastal towns were competing to build long and ornate piers to attract tourists.

In 1853, a group of Margate businessmen approach Birch to build the first screw-pile pier in Britain. In its design and construction, he brought two innovations: firstly, stylistic innovations directly influenced by his travels, and secondly, the adoption of screw blade added to iron piles making for a deeper and far more resilient base support. The result was a stylish and resilient Margate Pier, which survived storms and two world wars until it was destroyed by a storm in January 1978. The pier's foundations survive to this day, despite direct attempts at demolition.

The Margate pier led to a series of new commissions, which eventually ran to 14 piers in total, the most famous of which is the West Pier, Brighton. On top of this he designed the piled Royal Netley Hospital pier. His effect on pier construction techniques can be measured in the fact that, from 1862 to 1872, 18 new pleasure piers were built, the majority using screw piling. His last pier was at Plymouth, opened in the year he died, 1884.

In the BBC Radio 2 sitcom It Sticks Out Half a Mile (the radio sequel to Dad's Army), Birch is the builder of the fictional Frambourne-on-Sea pier.

=== Aquaria ===
Alongside his seaside work with piers, Birch was also well known for his design of aquaria in resort settings, first in Brighton and then in Scarborough.

Excavation of the site for the Brighton Marine Aquarium began in July 1870; the first brick was laid on 2 February 1871 and the whole project completed in August 1872. The building was 715 ft (218 metres) long, with average width of 100 ft (30.5 m.). It was built below street level so as not to obstruct the view for residents nearby. The principal entrance was opposite the Royal Albion Hotel, at the bottom of the Old Steine. Having descended three broad flights of granite steps, the visitor reached the floor of the entrance court, 20 ft below the Marine Parade.

The entrance court was 58 ft by 30 ft (17.5 m. by 9 m.) "Heat will come from hot-water pipes under the flooring. The entrance-hall will not only furnish a pleasant lounge and promenade; it will also be used as a lecture-room and for scientific conversaziones." The hall contained the world's largest display tank, for showing marine life. The entrance hall also provided a reading room, restaurant and a conservatory with fernery, rockery and cascade.

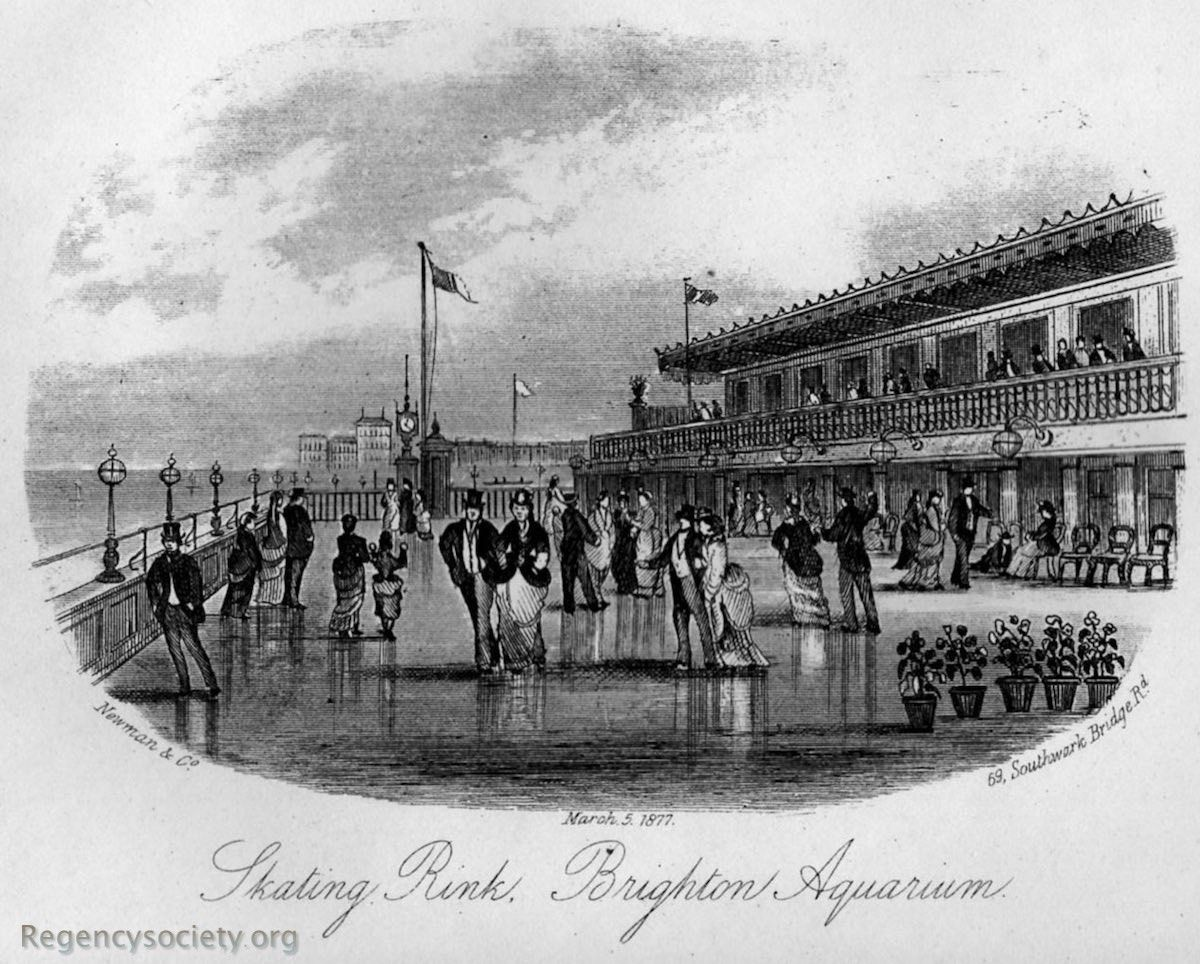
Skaters on the recently opened terrace above the Brighton Aquarium, 5 March 1877 © Regency Society of Brighton

The roof terrace was completed by 1874 and, two years later, a roller-skating rink, smoking room, cafe and music conservatory were all added.

"The Aquarium proved to be an instant success with the town’s fashionable society and received many royal visitors." The initial success was not sustained however, and by 1901 the Aquarium was in financial difficulty. In October the building and business were purchased by the corporation for £30,000, and Brighton Aquarium was thereafter managed as a municipal enterprise. "The Aquarium’s popularity then rose again as Brighton’s fortunes in general revived." In 1927 the Aquarium closed for a £117,000 modernisation. When it was reopened by the Duke of York on 12 June 1929, there had been many changes and additions, including a modern concert hall seating some 1,250 people.

The decision to construct the Scarborough Marine Aquarium (which would be bigger than its Brighton predecessor, though offering fewer attractions) was taken by the Town Council in January 1873.

Anyone in Scarborough in 1876, had they looked down near the Cliff Bridge, would have seen "beautiful and fairy-like groupings of arcades, courts, and grottoes concealed almost beneath his feet; vast corridors of rare architecture …; magnificent saloons …" The theme throughout was very much Indian, "of Moorish and Hindoo character, executed chiefly in coloured brickwork".

The Aquarium was opened "without any outward ceremony, and devoid of any outward pomp" on 21 May 1877. Although it closed in 1968, memories of the Aquarium live on in the form of a recent exhibition.

=== Later life ===
Later in his life, particularly during his travels, Birch produced numerous watercolour paintings, particularly those of Italy, Egypt and Nubia during a tour taken during the winter of 1874–75.

In the 1880s Birch damaged his ankle so severely that he was later forced to have his leg amputated to the thigh. Later complications led to his eventual death. Eugenius Birch died on 8 January 1884 at Laurieston Lodge, Hampstead. and is buried on the west side of Highgate Cemetery close to the grave of his brother John Braniss. Eugenius's grave (plot no.25915) has no headstone or identifiable memorial.

=== Personal life ===
On 10 February 1842, at Manchester Cathedral, Birch married Margaret Gent, the daughter of Charles, a silk manufacturer from Cheshire. She was the sister-in-law of Birch's sister. The couple had no children, but Birch had two children, Eugene (born 1879) and Ethel (born 1881), with his wife's niece, Marion Morris.

== List of piers ==
Location	Built	Contractor	Status	Comments
Margate Pier, Margate	1855–57		Closed 1976	First iron pier. Also known as Margate Jetty. Hit by storm-driven ship 1 January 1877. Hit by storm 11 January 1978. The wrecked pier remained for several years, surviving several attempts to blow it up, before final demolition though part of pier head remains.
North Pier, Blackpool	1862–63	R Laidlaw and Son, Glasgow	Open	Grade II-listed. The oldest remaining example of a Birch pier.
West Pier, Brighton	1863–66	R Laidlaw and Son, Glasgow	Closed 1975	Major sections collapsed in late 2002, and two fires in March and May 2003 left little of the original structure. Structured demolition took place in 2010 to make way for the observation tower i360; further structural damage from storms has occurred since.
Deal Pier	1864	R Laidlaw and Son, Glasgow	Final demolition 1954	Hit by ship 1940, destroying 200 feet of ironwork. Demolished by the army. Final demolition 1954. Replaced by a concrete pier, which opened in 1957.
Lytham Pier	1864–65	R Laidlaw and Son, Glasgow	Closed 1938. Demolished March/April 1960	In October 1903, sliced in two by drifting barges and repaired. The pavilion destroyed by fire in 1927.
Aberystwyth Royal Pier	1865	JE Dowson	Open	Grade II listed. Following storm damage, the pier is currently a third of its original length.
Eastbourne Pier	1866–72		Open	Grade II*-listed. The pier's arcade building, called the Blue Room, was destroyed in a fire in 2014. However, the pier continues to attract healthy numbers of visitors.
Birnbeck Pier, Weston-super-Mare	1867		Closed 1994	Grade II*-listed. Having purchased the pier in July 2023, North Somerset Council started restoration work on Birnbeck Pier, the only pier in the country to link to an island, in 2024.
New Brighton Pier	1867	JE Dowson	Closed 1972	Demolished 1977.
Scarborough North Pier	1866–69	J E Dowson and another	Destroyed 1905	Destroyed by storms in 1905. Entrance building remained until 1914.
Hastings Pier	1869–72	R Laidlaw and Son, Glasgow	Open	Re-opened in 2016 following a major restoration project.
Hornsea Pier	1880		Demolished 1897	Demolished following financial difficulties.
Bournemouth Pier	1880		Open	Pier head rebuilt in concrete in 1960, followed by the neck in 1979. Pier zip-line built in 2014.
Plymouth Pier	1884		Demolished 1953	Demolished 1953 following WWII bombing in 1940.
