= Eastbourne Pier =

Pier in Eastbourne, England

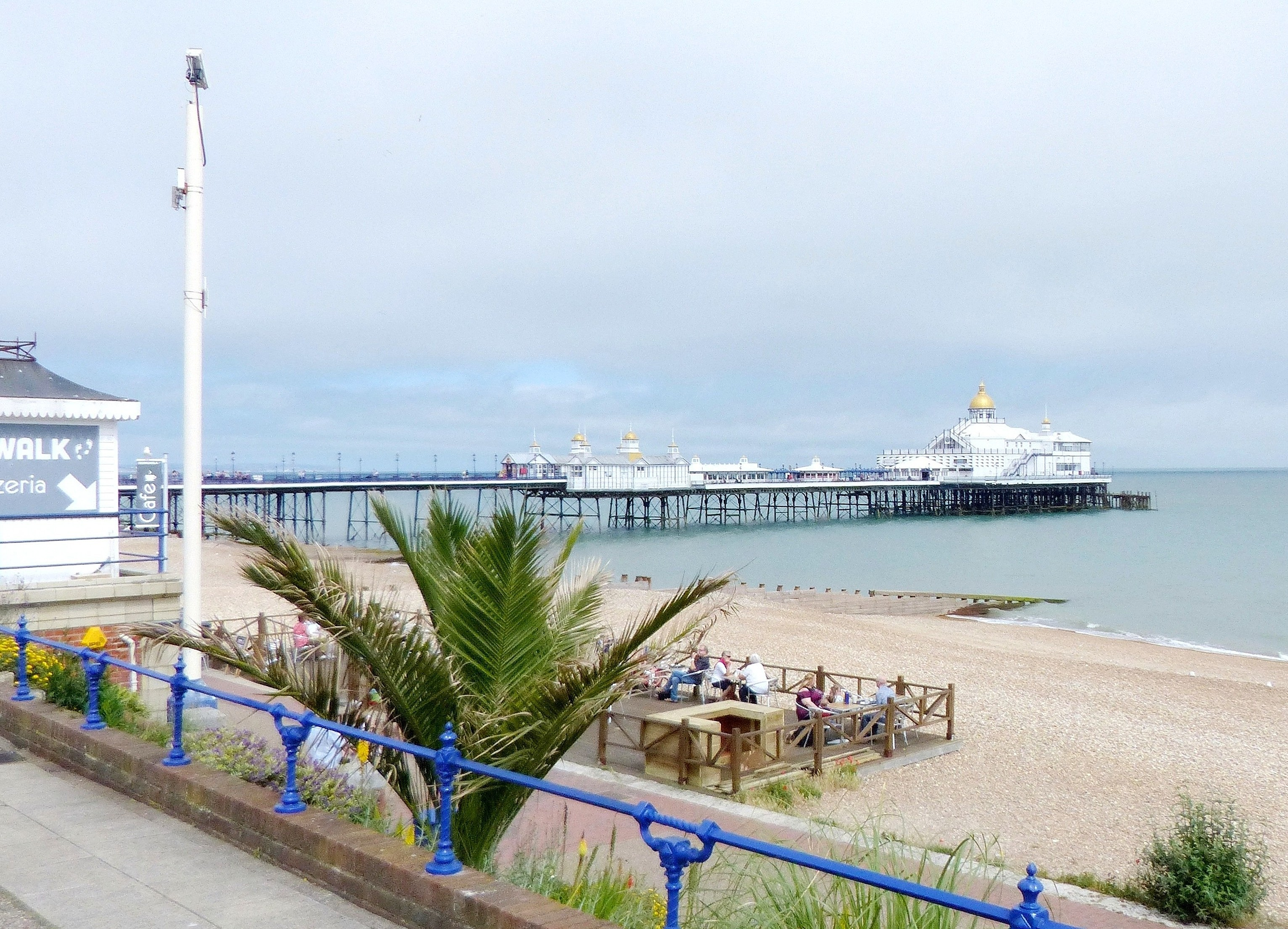
- Eastbourne Pier (June 2018)
- Type: Pleasure Pier
- Location: Eastbourne, East Sussex
- Coordinates: 50.7662°N 0.2946°E
- Official name: Eastbourne Pier
- Owner: Abid Gulzar

Characteristics
- Total length: 1,000 feet (300 m)

History
- Designer: Eugenius Birch
- Opening date: 13 June 1870

Eastbourne Pier is a seaside pleasure pier in Eastbourne, East Sussex, on the south coast of England.

== History ==
The proposal for a pier was first mooted at the end of 1863, and highly favoured by the town's major landowner, William Cavendish, 7th Duke of Devonshire. It was to have been 1000 feet in length and, at a cost of £12,000, would have been situated at the end of the town's grandest avenue, Devonshire Place. However, the project was delayed and finally abandoned in favour of the present site at the junction of Grand and Marine Parades, thus creating the easterly end of what amounts to a shingle bay. The pier interrupts what would otherwise have been a ribbon development of buildings – to the west, high-class hotels, with modest family hotels and boarding houses to the east.

The Eastbourne Pier Company was registered in April 1865 with a capital of £15,000 and on 18 April 1866 work began. It was opened by Lord Edward Cavendish on 13 June 1870, although it was not actually completed until two years later. On New Year's Day 1877 the landward half was swept away in a storm. It was rebuilt at a higher level, creating a drop towards the end of the pier. The pier is effectively built on stilts that rest in cups on the sea-bed allowing the whole structure to move during rough weather. It is roughly 300 metres (1000 ft) long. A domed 400-seater pavilion was constructed at a cost of £250 at the seaward end in 1888. A 1000-seater theatre, bar, camera obscura and office suite replaced this in 1899/1901. At the same time, two saloons were built midway along the pier. The camera obscura fell into disuse in the 1960s but was restored in 2003 with a new stairway built to provide access.

Paddle steamers (such as the PS Brighton Queen and the PS Devonia) operated by P and A Campbell ran trips from the pier along the south coast, to the Isle of Wight and across the Channel to Boulogne from 1906 until the outbreak of the Second World War. These were resumed after the war, but the paddle steamers were gradually withdrawn from service. In 1957, the final season was operated by a motor vessel.

During the Second World War, part of the decking was removed and machine guns were installed in the theatre providing a useful point from which to repel any attempted enemy landings and a Bofors anti-aircraft gun was sited midway along the length of the pier. In December 1942, an exploding mine caused considerable damage to the pier and nearby hotels; it had been tied to the stanchions by the local police, who were under the mistaken impression that it was fitted with a safety device. In 1943, a detachment of Royal Canadian Engineers fixed camouflage netting over the stanchions to conceal flotillas of small vessels, such as wooden assault landing craft. A George Medal and a British Empire Medal were awarded to two of the engineers who dived into the sea on 3 February 1943 to rescue a comrade who had fallen from a cableway which crossed a 30-foot gap in the structure.

Various traditional pier theatres were built over the years but after the last one was destroyed by fire in 1970, it was replaced by a nightclub and bar which remain to this day. On the landward half of the pier stands a fish and chip kiosk, an amusement arcade and a fast food outlet. Further out, as well as the club there is a cafe, a restaurant, a glassblower, a clothes shop and an ice cream shop. The tower at the end of the pier is often used as a viewing point during the annual air show. For more than a decade, the pier played host to the town's annual Birdman competition, which saw competitors jump into the sea in home-made costumes to see who could 'fly' the furthest.

In May 2009, the listed building status of the pier was upgraded from Grade II to Grade II*.

Six Piers Limited placed Eastbourne Pier up for sale in 2009, with an asking price of £5.5 million. The sale price included a tea room, two bars, an amusement arcade and a nightclub.

On 21 October 2015, Abid Gulzar, a local hotelier, bought the pier for an undisclosed price, although it is believed to be less than £5.5 million. The pier was then fully repaired and reopened.

== Fire ==
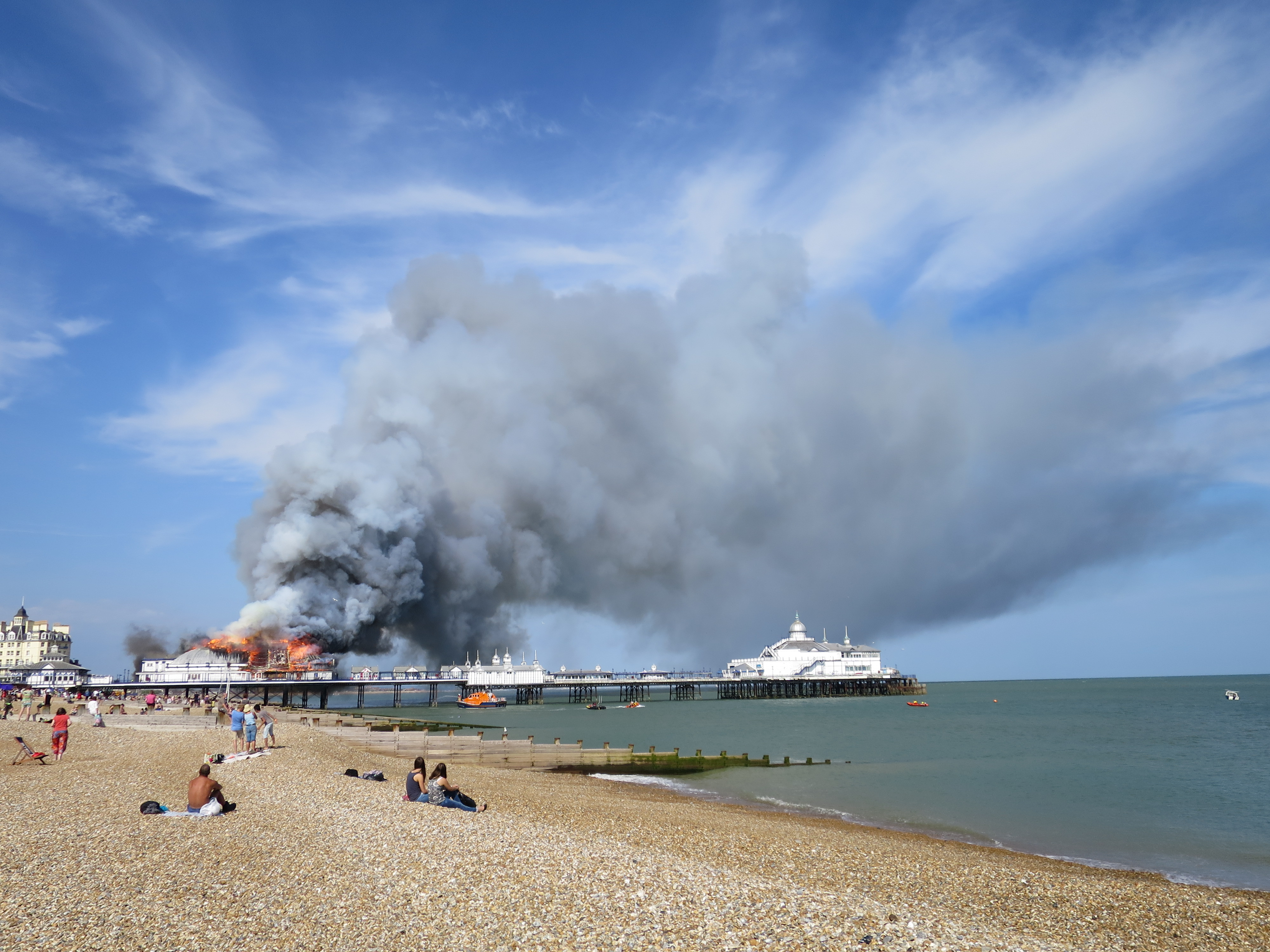
The pier on fire on 30 July 2014

The pier suffered a fire on 30 July 2014 that ripped through a large amount of the central domed building. Sussex Police initially said that the fire was not to be treated suspiciously, though later the police said arson was suspected.

East Sussex Fire and Rescue Service deployed up to 80 officers to tackle the blaze, which allegedly started in wood panelling in the walls of the games arcade. After fighting the fire through the night, fire officers eliminated the main hotspots and saved two-thirds of the pier with the main arcade being the only large building affected. The outer pavilion was not reached by the fire, which came just two weeks before Eastbourne's largest tourist event on the seafront, the airshow Airbourne.

A few days after the airshow, a 44-year-old workman on the pier fell through the destroyed part and died hours later.

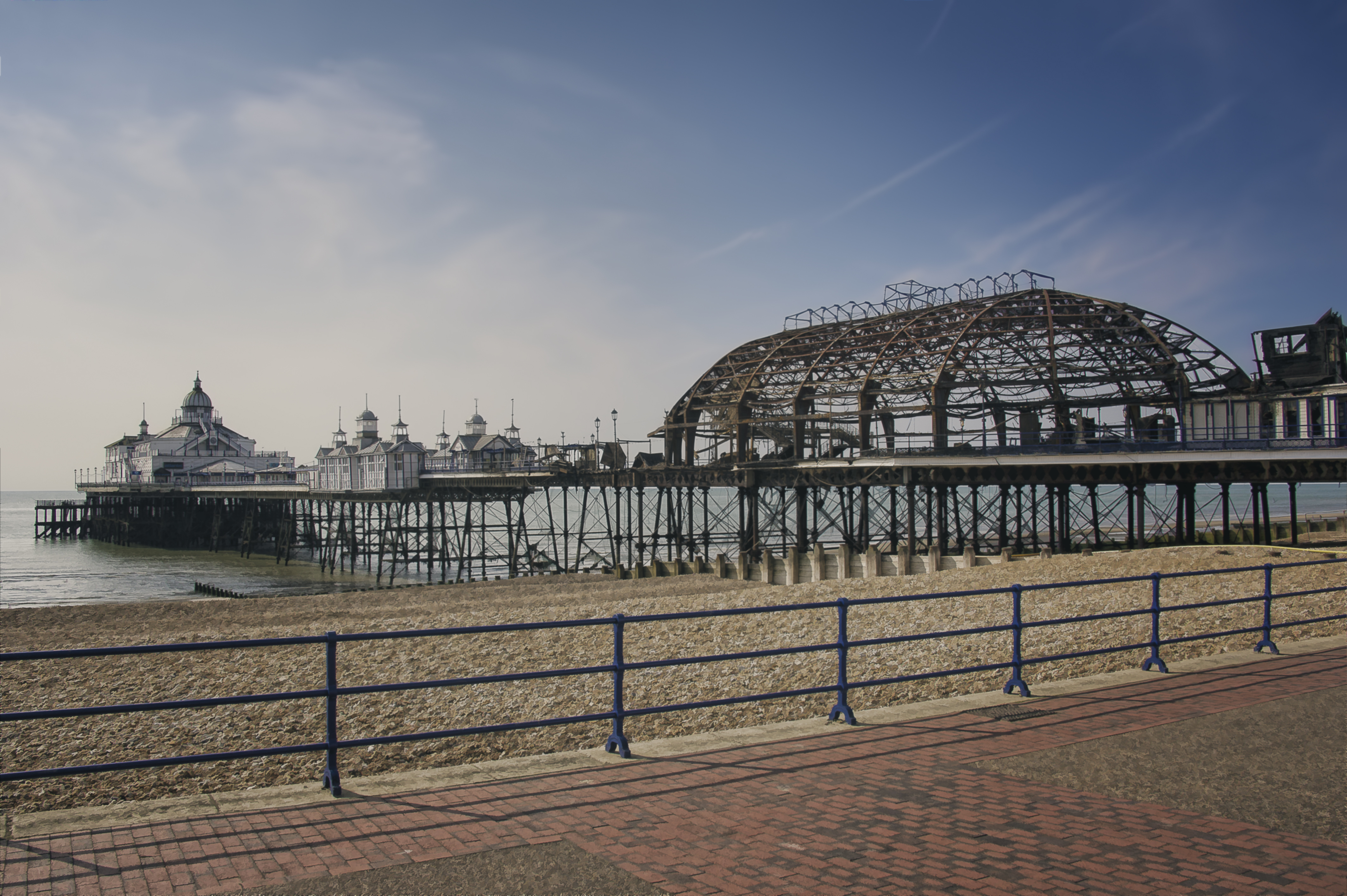
Eastbourne Pier on 31 July 2014, the day after a fire destroyed a third of it

== In popular culture ==
The pier appears in the Agatha Christie's Poirot episodes "Jewel Robbery at the Grand Metropolitan" (although the story is set in Brighton) and "Curtain: Poirot's Last Case". It was also featured in the 2001 film Last Orders and the 2008 film Angus, Thongs and Perfect Snogging. The 2010 film Brighton Rock used Eastbourne Pier to stand in for Brighton's Palace Pier.

== Awards ==
- 1997 – National Piers Society – Pier of the Year

== Gallery ==
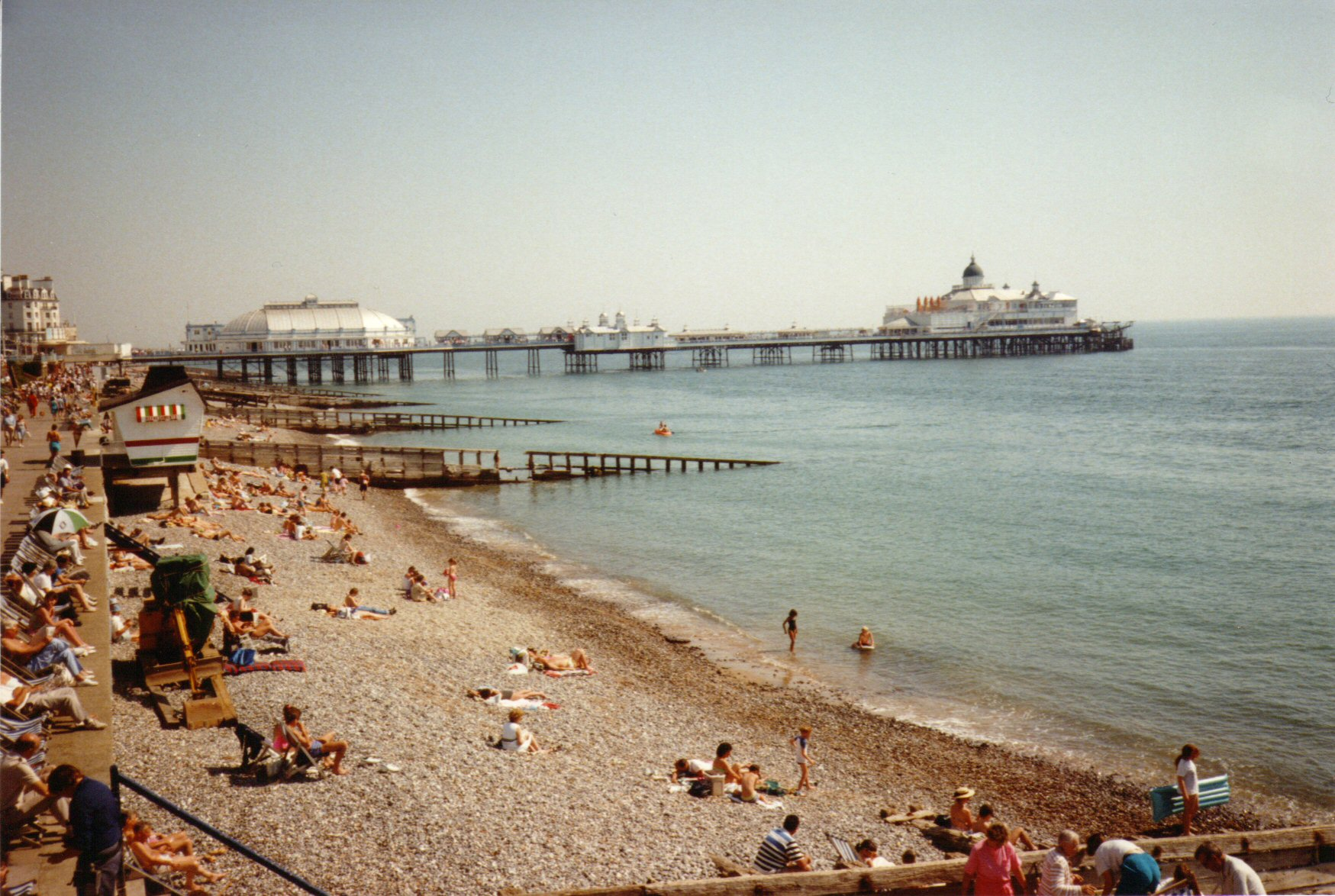
Eastbourne Pier

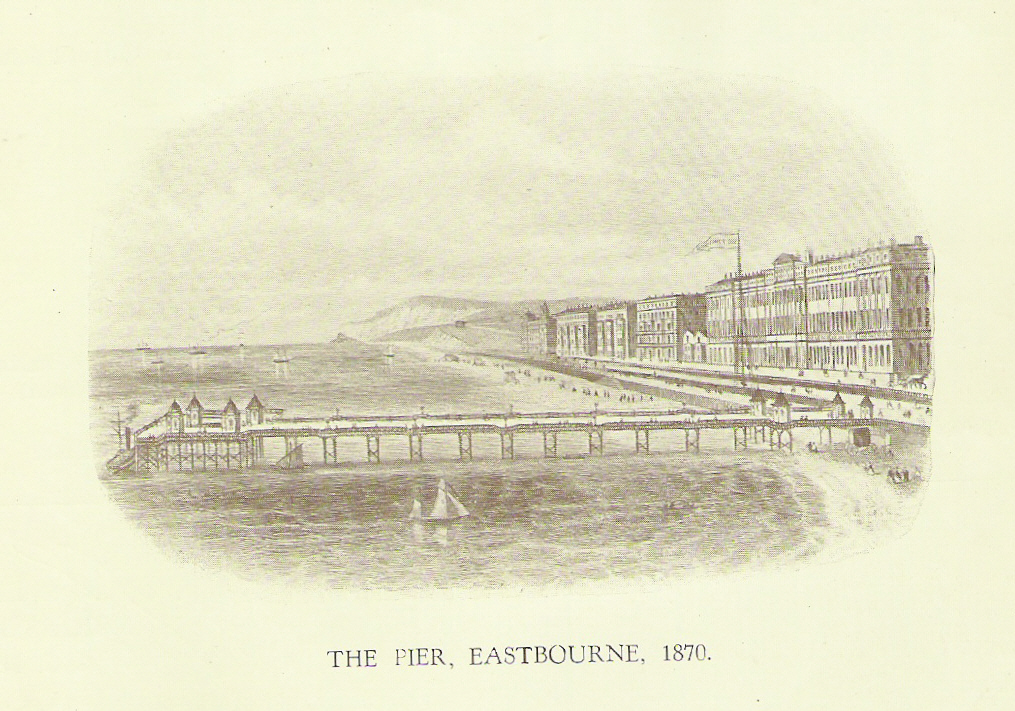
Etching from 1870

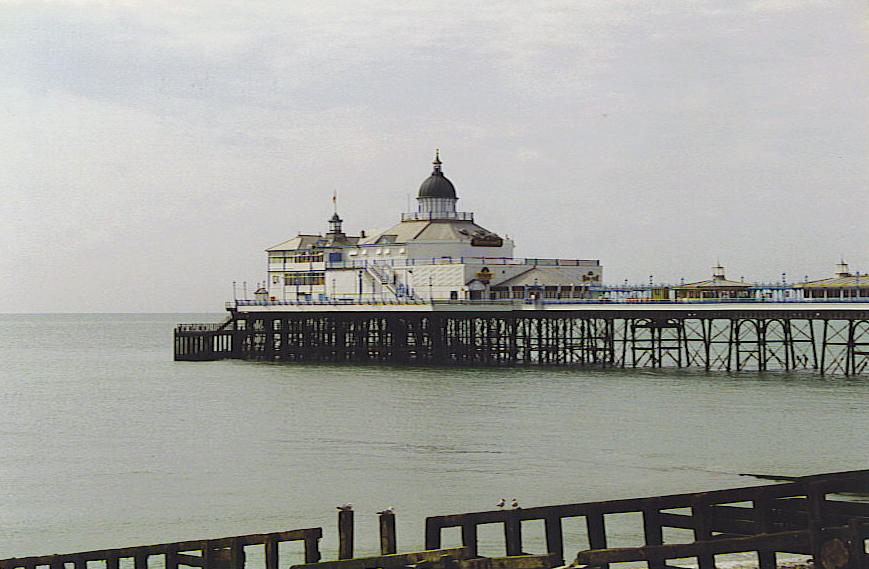
Summer 1996

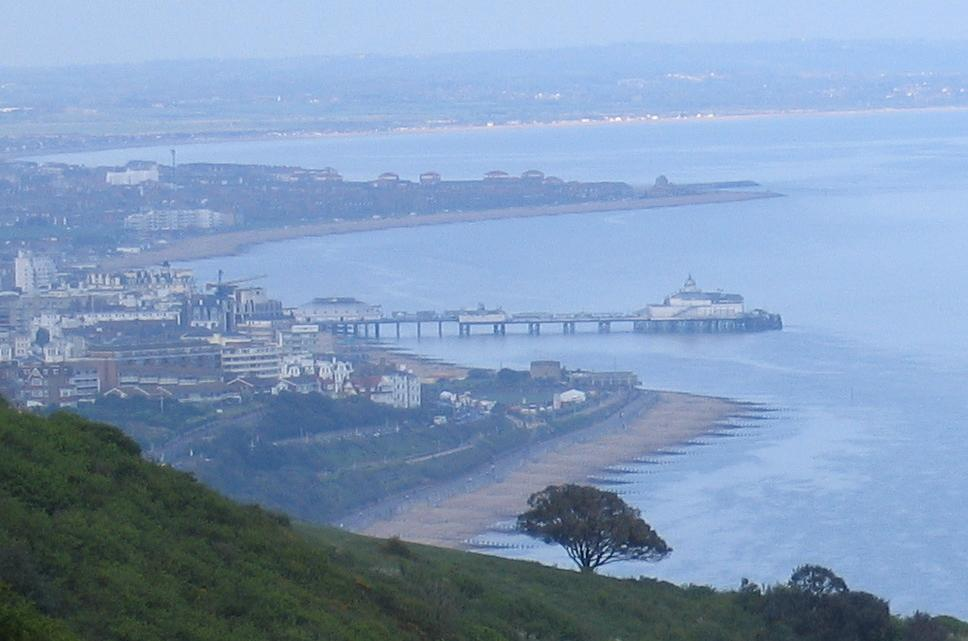
View from the Downs

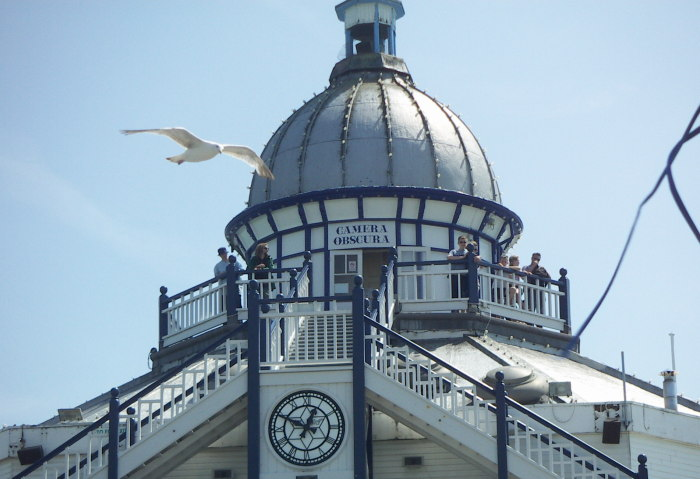
The pier's tower with its camera obscura

== See also ==
- Listed buildings in Eastbourne

== Notes ==
Awards and achievements
Preceded by Not awarded	National Piers Society; Pier of the Year; 1997	Succeeded by Brighton Palace Pier
