= Scarborough North Pier =

Former pleasure pier (1868-1905) in Scarborough, North Yorkshire, England

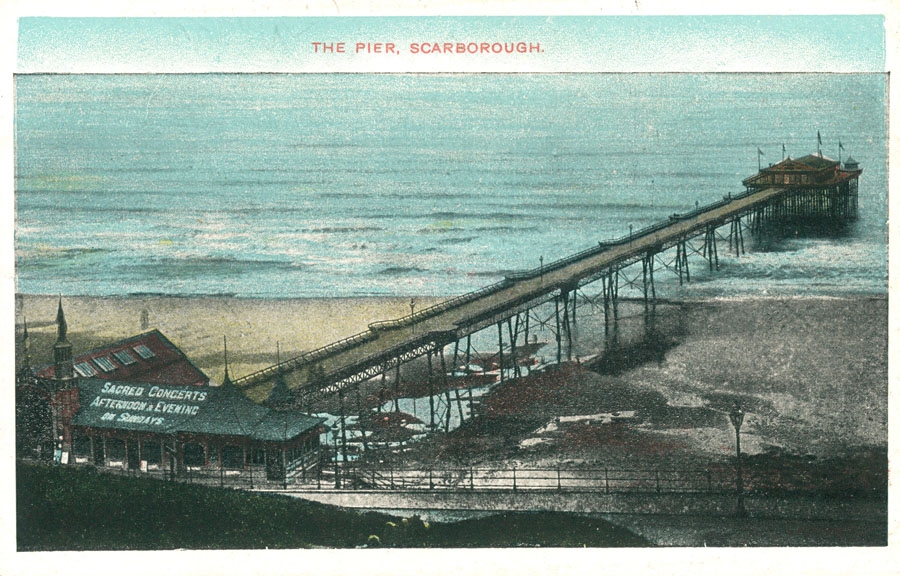
- Type: Pleasure and steamer pier
- Carries: Promenaders and steamer passengers
- Spans: North Sea
- Location: North Bay, Scarborough, North Yorkshire
- Coordinates: 54°17′25″N 0°24′10″W

Characteristics
- Total length: 1,000 feet (305 m)
- Width: 20 feet (6.1 m) but 50 feet (15.2 m) at the pier head

History
- Designer: Eugenius Birch
- Constructor: J E Dowson and another
- Client: Scarborough Promenade Pier Company
- Construction start: 14 September 1866
- Completion date: 1869
- Opening date: 1 May 1869
- Renovated: 1889
- Closure date: January 1905
- Destruction date: 7 January 1905

Scarborough North Pier (1868-1905) was a steamer and promenade pier in North Bay, Scarborough, North Yorkshire, England.

== Planning and construction ==
=== Abortive plans ===
In 1862 the Scarborough Pier and Improvement Company led by engineer Josiah Forster Fairbank issued a prospectus proposing a pier and other facilities on the beach in North Bay for a capitalisation of £20,000. In 1863 following a setback with his Rock Gardens no further progress was made and the company was finally dissolved in March 1882.

In 1863 the Scarborough Marine Promenade and Jetty Company was formed with the aim of building a pleasure and steamer pier in the South Bay at Scarborough. The pier was to be 1,410 feet (430 m) long 45 feet (14 m) wide with a pier head 225 feet (69 m) long and 90 feet (27 m) wide with a saloon, refreshment room and landing stage. In 1864 despite strong opposition from Scarborough Piers & Harbour Commissioners, Scarborough Corporation and others the Board of Trade gave it a provisional order to proceed, but little further happened.

=== Planning, design and construction ===
In 1864 there was a further proposal for a pier, this time in the North Bay with a capitalization of £15,000, leading to the formation of the Scarborough Promenade Pier Company and in 1865 they issued a prospectus proposing a 1,000 feet (305 m) pier. That year engineer and prominent pier designer Eugenius Birch was engaged, then the company was registered with the Board of Trade and the next year the company was granted a provisional order – the Scarborough Promenade Pier Order 1866 – to proceed. A £12,135 offer by J.E. Dowson of London to build the pier was accepted and the first piles were driven in September 1866 and with a change of contractor the pier was complete by 1869 and the pier was opened on 1 May that year.

The pier was designed to be 1,000 feet (305 m) long and 20 feet (6.1 m) wide and the pier head itself was 50 feet (15.2 m) wide and 150 feet (46 m) long with 6 feet (1.8 m) of water at low spring tide. The pier design had facilities for angling and a pier head shelter for band concerts.

== Operation and destruction ==
There were frequent collisions of steamers with the pier head and the pier never made much money. With the closure of the nearby Queens Parade Cliff Lift (1878-1887) income fell, the company was wound up and the pier was sold in 1889 for £1,240. In 1889 the new owners spent £10,000 replacing the original entrance booths with an entrance building and restaurant, enlarging the pier head and adding a pavilion and refreshment room and even with variety shows it failed to generate enough income.

The pier was sold again in 1904 for £3,500 but on 7 January next year it was wrecked in a storm leaving only the entrance pavilion and isolated pier head. Later the pier head was demolished leaving the entrance building, itself demolished in 1914.
