= Royal Pier, Aberystwyth =

Pier in Aberystwyth, Wales

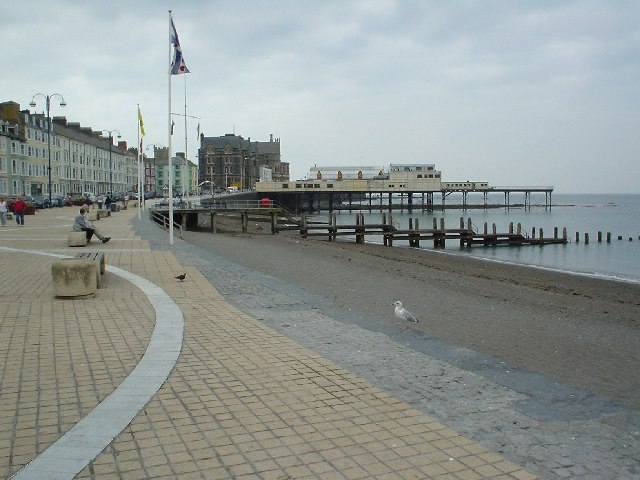
- The Royal Pier, from Aberystwyth seafront looking south
- Type: Pleasure
- Carries: pedestrians
- Spans: Cardigan Bay
- Location: Aberystwyth, Wales
- Coordinates: 52.4159°N 4.0878°W
- Owner: Revegate Ltd.

Characteristics
- Construction: hardwood decking on iron piles
- Total length: 242 metres (794 ft)

History
- Designer: Eugenius Birch
- Constructor: J.E. Dowson
- Opening date: 1865

Map of the Aberystwyth Seafront buildings

The Royal Pier, Aberystwyth is a pleasure pier located in Aberystwyth, Ceredigion, Wales. The first pier to open in Wales (1865), it is now a much shorter version of its original length of 242 metres (794 ft) after a series of heavy storms.

== Construction ==
In the health-conscious Victorian era, Aberystwyth had developed quickly as a holiday resort. Lying at the centre of the West Wales coastline, with Cardigan Bay beyond, it was billed as the "Biarritz of Wales." Commissioned by a consortium of local business people under the name of the Aberystwyth Pier Promenade Company, the pier was designed and constructed by noted pier-engineer Eugenius Birch, in conjunction with local contractors J. E. Dowson. The structure used iron rod braces, cast-iron piles, and supporting columns concreted into the rock. Total construction costs were £13,600.

== Operations ==
Opened on Good Friday in 1865, the 242 metres (794 ft) pier attracted 7,000 toll-paying visitors on its first day of opening, the same day that the Cambrian Railways line from Machynlleth officially opened. However, this was the high point of the pier under its original owners, when seven months later, in January 1866, a severe storm washed away a 30 metres (98 ft) section at the seaward end.

The original owners could not afford to replace the lost section, and so sold the pier in 1872. The new owners replaced the lost section with a new 70 metres (230 ft) thinner section, and built a new head gallery and refreshments stall.

At the end of the 19th century, a new glass pavilion designed by Gordon Croydon-Marks was added at the landward end. Erected by Bourne Engineering & Electrical Company, it consisted of three aisles surmounted by glass domed roofs, with the ironwork decorated in a Gothic-style. Opened by the Princess of Wales on 26 July 1896, the pavilion could accommodate 3,000 people.

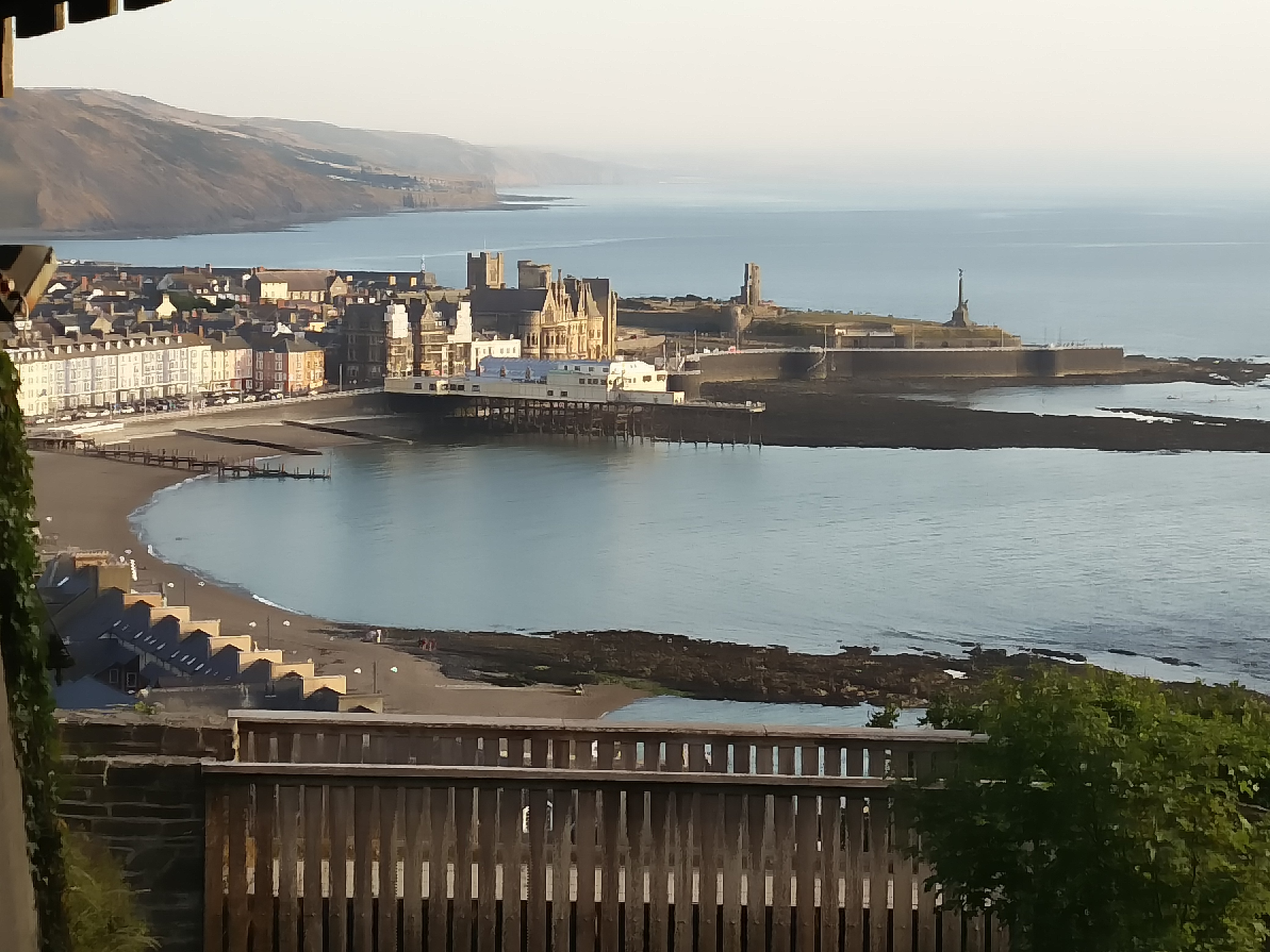
The hill within the bay

On the night of Friday 14 January 1938, a storm with estimated wind speeds of up to 90 mph (140 km/h) struck the town. Most of the promenade was destroyed, along with 200 feet (61 m) of the pier, reducing its length by half. Many properties on the seafront were damaged, with every property from the King's Hall north affected, those on Victoria Terrace having suffered the greatest damage. Work commenced on a protective coffer dam until 1940, with total costs of construction coming to £70,000 (equivalent to £2.5m today).

During World War II, it was in such a poor state of repair that the pier remained closed, as repairing it was deemed a security risk. Repaired but not improved, by the 1970s the remaining neck was again in such a bad state of repair that it was closed.

In 1979, Aberystwyth Royal Pier was purchased by the Don Leisure Group, and in 1986 they spent £250,000 on improvements to the remainder of the 91 metres (299 ft) pier. Planning permission was granted for the construction of a new pier alongside the original, but the project never came to fruition. A new snooker hall and restaurant were opened in 1987, in a refurbished pavilion.

Today, Royal Pier consists of an ice-cream shop, a pub, a snooker hall, a restaurant, an amusement arcade centre and a nightclub.
