= Margate Jetty =

Former pier in Margate, Kent, England

- Margate Pier in 1961
- Type: Victorian pleasure pier, steamboat jetty
- Location: Margate, Kent
- Coordinates: 51.3947°N 1.3804°E
- Owner: Margate Pier Harbour Company

Characteristics
- Total length: 1,100 feet (340 m) (wooden pier)

History
- Designer: Eugenius Birch (iron pier)
- Construction start: 1853 (iron pier)
- Completion date: 1824 (wooden pier); 1857 (iron pier)
- Opening date: 1855 (iron pier)
- Closure date: 1976
- Destruction date: 1978
- Demolition date: 1998

The Margate Jetty (also known as Margate Pier) was a pier in Margate built by the Margate Pier Harbour Company in 1824 and was demolished in 1998.

== History ==
=== 19th century ===
Margate Pier, Margate, Kent, England: ships and boats in the harbour. Steel engraving by J. Newman.

The first jetty, estimated at around 1,100 feet (340 m), was built by the Margate Pier Harbour Company in 1824. It was known as the Jarvis Landing Stage and allowed ships to load and unload passengers at low tide when Margate Harbour was inaccessible. On August 1826, William Fry described of the pier,

‘Over the Entrance is Jarvis’s Landing Place – this Jetty is 1,062 feet long, projecting into the Sea, the floor is full of loop holes thus to prevent its bursting by the force of the Waves, this floor is supported by strong beams of timber driven into the shore.’

The wooden structure required frequent repair and, on 4 November 1851, was broken in two places during a storm. A new jetty built iron with a screw pile was designed by Eugenius Birch. Later, construction begun in 1853. It became the first iron seaside pier in the world when it opened in 1855, though work to complete it continued until 1857. A pavilion was constructed at the pierhead in 1858 and used as a station building for steamship departures and arrivals. On February 1869, a group of men were rescued from a sailing boat that had went ashore near the pier.

Views of the British Isles, in the Photochrom print collection between 1890 and 1900

The pier was extended in 1871 for the high-water landing, and later in a distinctive octagonal pierhead was added. The wood used in the construction was greenheart, a type of hardwood found natively in Guyana. On 1 January 1877 the pier was cut through by a shipwreck driven by a storm; between 40 and 50 people were trapped on the seaward side of the break until the next day when they could be rescued. On 24 November 1877 the jetty was struck by a drifting vessel that caused £4,000 of damage. The jetty was fully opened on the 1st of May 1877 by the Lord Mayor of London. Further additions were made to the pier in 1893 and 1900. In 1898 a building and slipway was constructed on the pier to allow the Royal National Lifeboat Institution (RNLI) Margate Lifeboat Station to be relocated to the pier. Popular attraction along the pier in 1899 included a large casino and restaurant.

=== 20th century ===
Part of the pier's decking was pulled up in 1940 to prevent its use by a potential invading German army. The decking was later replaced and the pier used to load Allied troop and supply vessels. After the war the pier returned to use as a steamship jetty, with the last sailings being made in 1966. The pavilion was badly damaged by fire in 1964. Margate Jetty closed because of safety concerns in 1976.

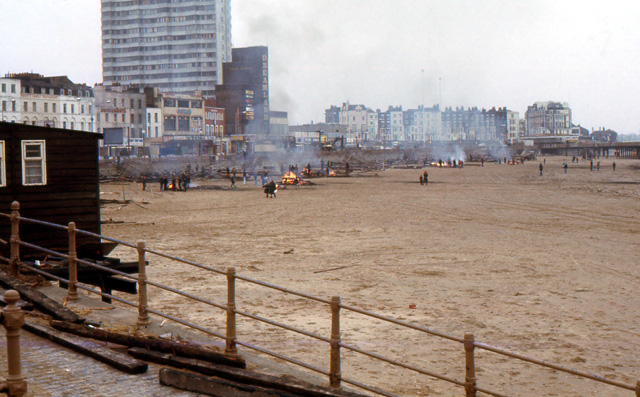
Burning debris from destroyed pier on Margate beach

A storm surge on 11–12 January 1978 destroyed much of the structure and washed debris onto the beach. The RNLI station was isolated by the collapse. An RAF Search and Rescue Force Westland Wessex helicopter airlifted a lifeboat crew to the station to launch the boat and recover it to Ramsgate Lifeboat Station. The wooden wreckage of the pier was burnt on the beach in the days following the storm surge, though portions were salvaged. However, the wreckage resulted in the loss of the last traditional lifeboat slipways in Kent. A replacement Royal Lifeboat station was later constructed at Margate Harbour, where it remains in use.

More than 12 controlled explosions were made to demolish parts of the structure and the final portions were dismantled in 1998. Relics from the pier structure are held at Margate Museum, these include the entrance plaque and portions of the railings and deck. The museum also holds a collection of memorabilia relating to the pier. Other pieces of salvaged wreckage can be found at locations across the town.

=== 21st century ===
A fundraising campaign was begun in 2007 to raise money to rebuild the pier. In summer 2018 a Dreamland Margate Mural-by-the-Sea art installation was erected at the former landward end of the pier. This took the form of a horseshoe-shaped lifebuoy with the words "Save Yourselves" written on it. In 2022, an old piece of jetty timber was found washed up along the shores of Nayland, Suffolk.

== Turner painting ==
The artist J. M. W. Turner boarded for a time in Margate and painted an oil sketch that included the jetty, which he could see from his window. It is thought that this work became damaged and was rolled up. At some point the canvas was cut down; a portion measuring 38.1 by 27.9 centimetres (15.0 in × 11.0 in) was purchased by Gwendoline Davies from a gallery in 1910. Davies donated the work to National Museum Wales in 1952. An assessment in 1956 determined that it was not a work by Turner but just in his style. A reassessment in 2012 determined that the brushwork and colours used was typical of late Turner paintings and it was attributed to him.

Margate Jetty by M.W. Turner circa 1840

== Media ==
Margate Pier is featured in the novel ‘Last Orders’ by Graham Swift in 1996, which was later adapted by Fred Schepisi to a drama film in 2001. The story is of a group following the final wishes of their friend, Jack Dodds , who requested that his ashes be scattered off Margate Pier.
