= Pier =

Raised structure in a body of water

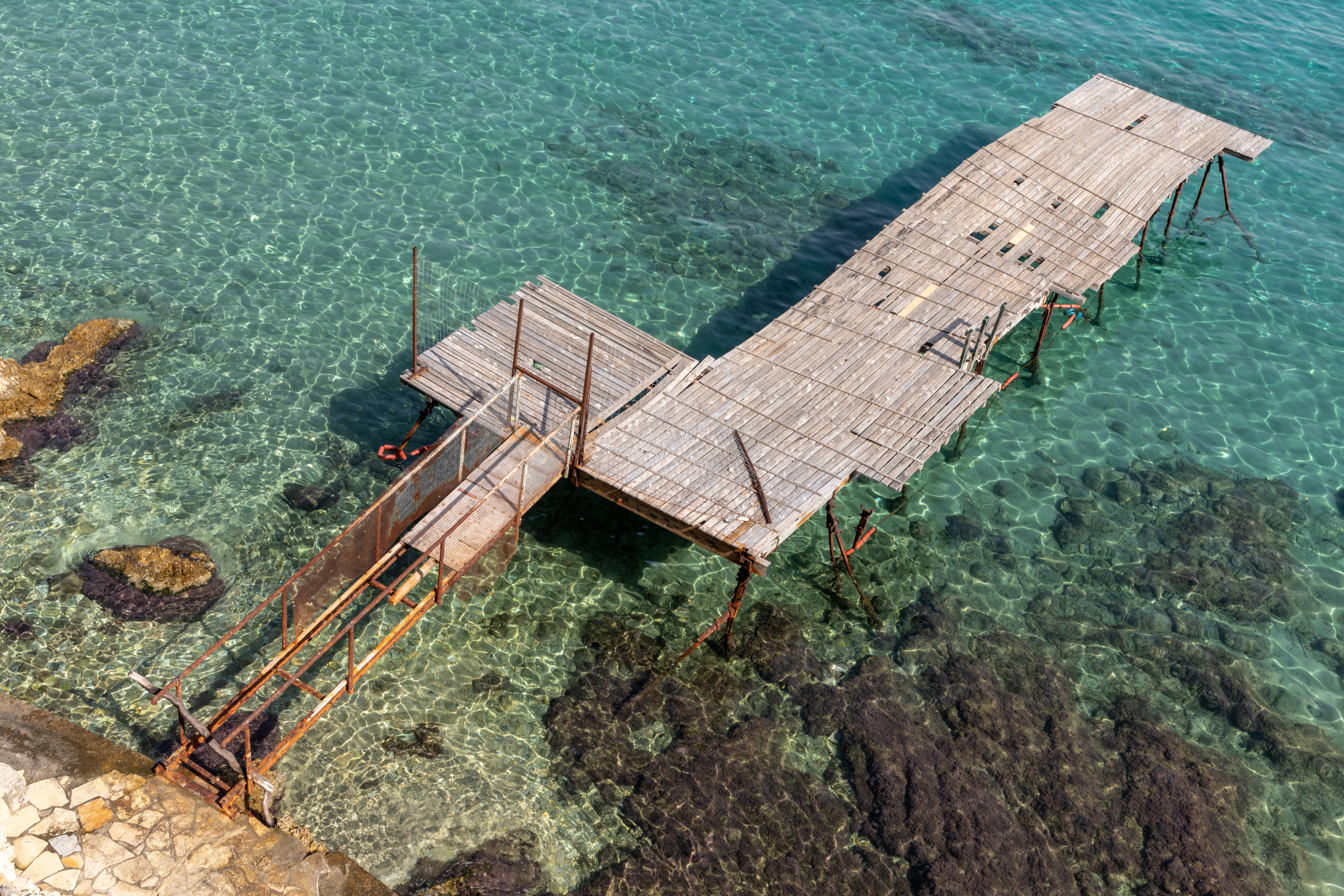
A wooden pier in Corfu, Greece

A pier is a raised structure that rises above a body of water and usually juts out from its shore, typically supported by piles or pillars, and provides above-water access to offshore areas. Frequent pier uses include fishing, boat docking and access for both passengers and cargo, and oceanside recreation such as swimming (e.g. the Edgar Downie Pier in Kingston, the 46 swim piers in Lake Geneva, or LoveQuay swim pier in Toronto). Bridges, buildings, and walkways may all be supported by architectural piers. Their open structure allows tides and currents to flow relatively unhindered, whereas the more solid foundations of a quay or the closely spaced piles of a wharf can act as a breakwater, and are consequently more liable to silting. Piers can range in size and complexity from a simple lightweight wooden structure to major structures extended over 1,600 m (5,200 ft). In American English, a pier may be synonymous with a dock.

Piers have been built for several purposes, and because these different purposes have distinct regional variances, the term pier tends to have different nuances of meaning in different parts of the world. Thus in North America and Australia, where many ports were, until recently, built on the multiple pier model, the term tends to imply a current or former cargo-handling facility. In contrast, in Europe, where ports more often use basins and river-side quays than piers, the term is principally associated with the image of a Victorian cast iron pleasure pier which emerged in Great Britain during the early 19th century. However, the earliest piers pre-date the Victorian age.

== Types ==
Piers can be categorized into different groupings according to the principal purpose. However, there is considerable overlap between these categories. For example, pleasure piers often also allow for the docking of pleasure steamers and other similar craft, while working piers have often been converted to leisure use after being rendered obsolete by advanced developments in cargo-handling technology. Many piers are floating piers, to ensure that the piers raise and lower with the tide along with the boats tied to them. This prevents a situation where lines become overly taut or loose by rising or lowering tides. An overly taut or loose tie-line can damage boats by pulling them out of the water or allowing them so much leeway that they bang forcefully against the sides of the pier.

=== Working piers ===
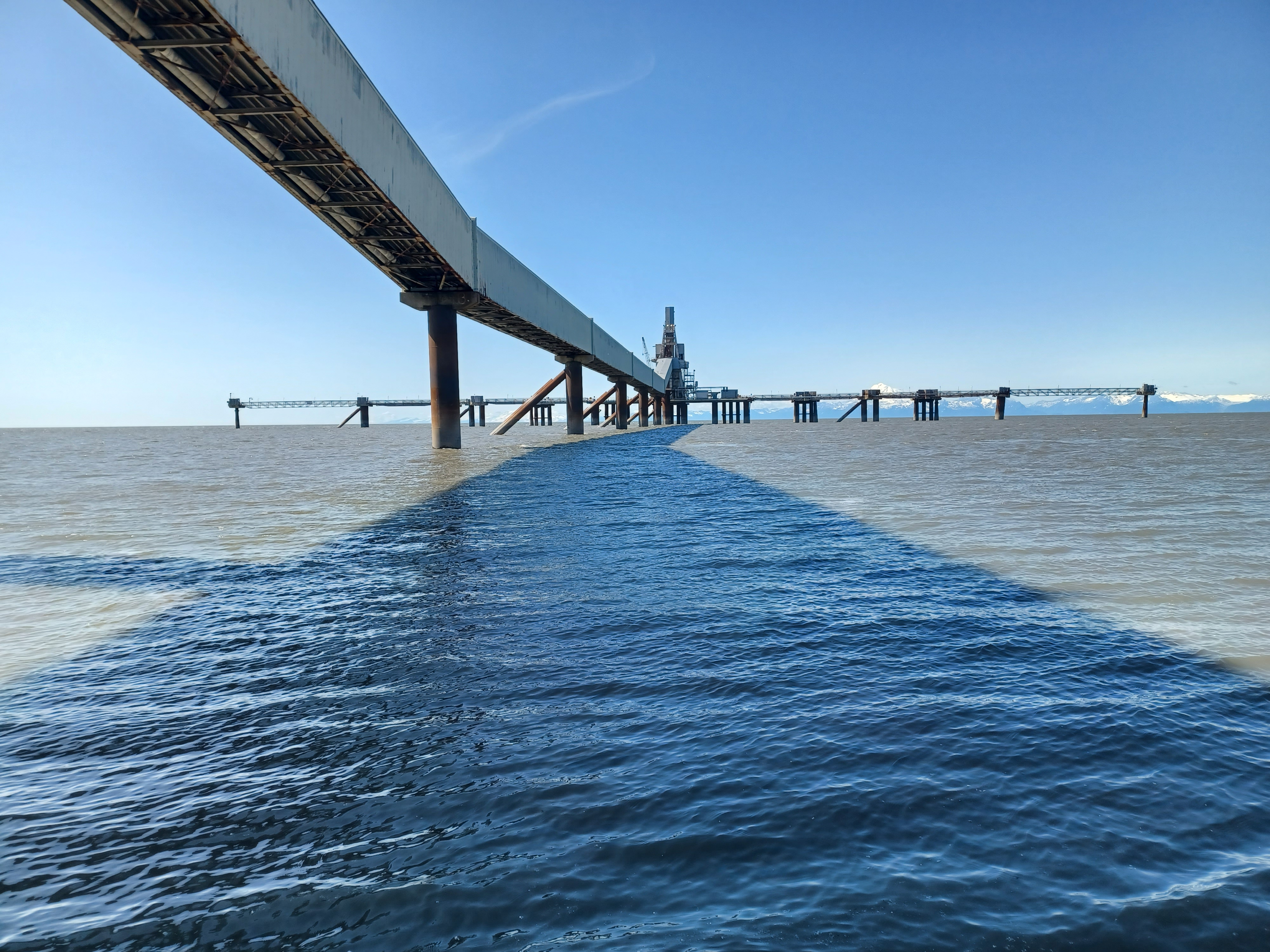
Out-of-use industrial bulk cargo Pier, Cook Inlet, Alaska.

Working piers were built for the handling of passengers and cargo onto and off ships or (as at Wigan Pier) canal boats. Working piers themselves fall into two different groups. Longer individual piers are often found at ports with large tidal ranges, with the pier stretching far enough off shore to reach deep water at low tide. Such piers provided an economical alternative to impounded docks where cargo volumes were low, or where specialist bulk cargo was handled, such as at coal piers. The other form of working pier, often called the finger pier, was built at ports with smaller tidal ranges. Here the principal advantage was to give a greater available quay length for ships to berth against compared to a linear littoral quayside, and such piers are usually much shorter. Typically each pier would carry a single transit shed the length of the pier, with ships berthing bow or stern in to the shore. Some major ports consisted of large numbers of such piers lining the foreshore, classic examples being the Hudson River frontage of New York, or the Embarcadero in San Francisco.

The advent of container shipping, with its need for large container handling spaces adjacent to the shipping berths, has made working piers obsolete for the handling of general cargo, although some still survive for the handling of passenger ships or bulk cargos. One example, is in use in Progreso, Yucatán, where a pier extends more than 4 miles into the Gulf of Mexico, making it the longest pier in the world. The Progreso Pier supplies much of the peninsula with transportation for the fishing and cargo industries and serves as a port for large cruise ships in the area. Many other working piers have been demolished, or remain derelict, but some have been recycled as pleasure piers. The best known example of this is Pier 39 in San Francisco.

At Southport and the Tweed River on the Gold Coast in Australia, there are piers that support equipment for a sand bypassing system that maintains the health of sandy beaches and navigation channels.

=== Pleasure piers ===
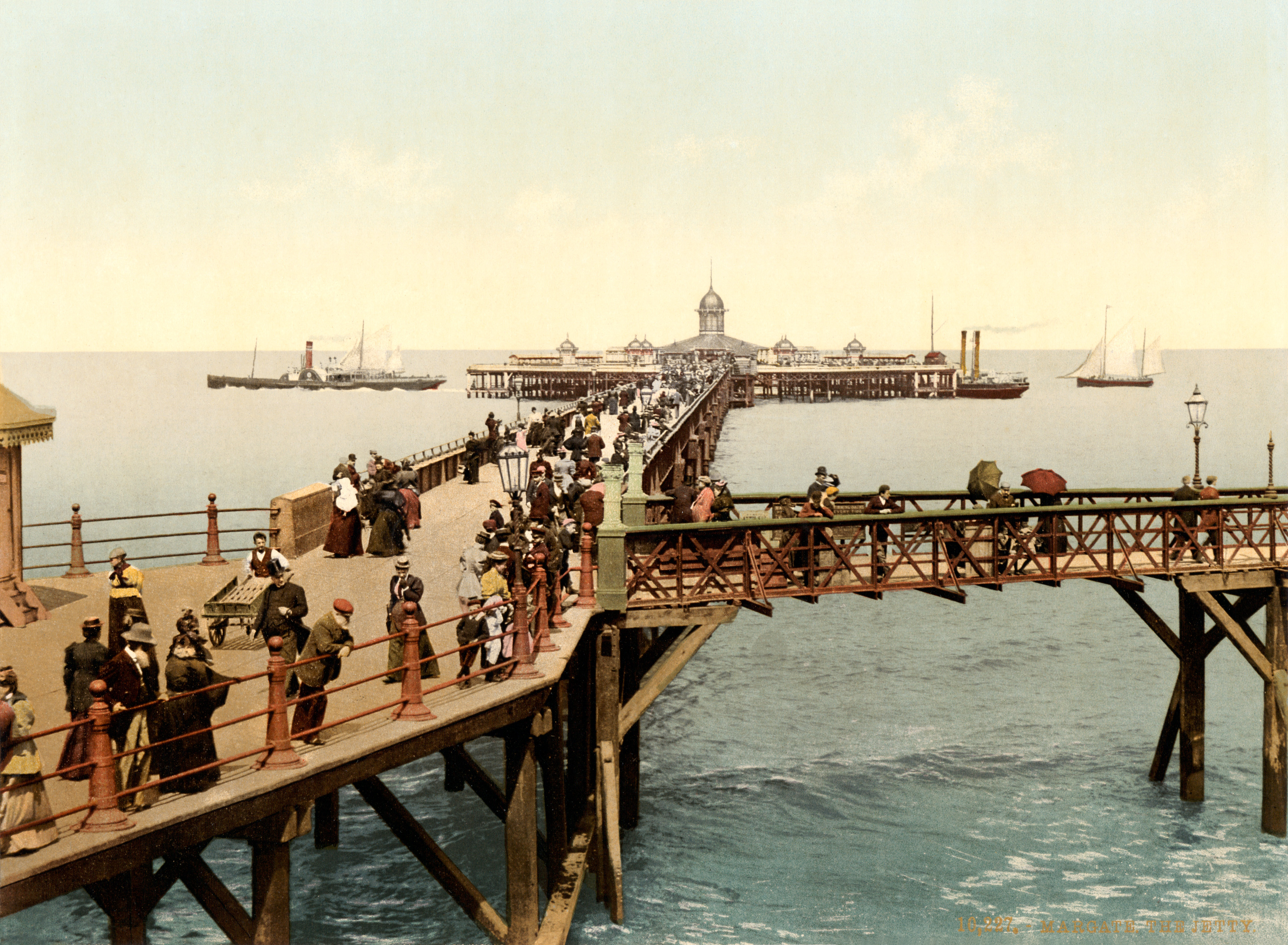
Print of a Victorian pier in Margate in the English county of Kent, 1897

Pleasure piers were first built in Britain during the early 19th century. The earliest structures were Ryde Pier, built in 1813/4, Trinity Chain Pier near Leith, built in 1821, Brighton Chain Pier, built in 1823. and Margate Jetty 1823/24 originally a timber built pier.

Only the oldest of these piers still remains. At that time, the introduction of steamships and railways for the first time permitted mass tourism to dedicated seaside resorts. The large tidal ranges at many such resorts meant that passengers arriving by pleasure steamer could use a pier to disembark safely. Also, for much of the day, the sea was not visible from the shore and the pleasure pier permitted holidaymakers to promenade over and alongside the sea at all times. The world's longest pleasure pier is at Southend-on-Sea, Essex, and extends 1.3 miles (2.1 km) into the Thames Estuary. The longest pier on the West Coast of the US is the Santa Cruz Wharf, with a length of 2,745 feet (837 m).

Providing a walkway out to sea, pleasure piers often include amusements and theatres as part of their attractions. Such a pier may be unroofed, closed, or partly open and partly closed. Sometimes a pier has two decks. Galveston Island Historic Pleasure Pier in Galveston, Texas has a roller coaster, 15 rides, carnival games and souvenir shops.

Early pleasure piers were of complete timber construction, as was with Margate which opened in 1824. The first iron and timber built pleasure pier Margate Jetty, opened in 1855. Margate pier was wrecked by a storm in January 1978 and not repaired. The longest iron pleasure pier still remaining is the one at Southend. First opened as a wooden pier in 1829, it was reconstructed in iron and completed in 1889. In a 2006 UK poll, the public voted the seaside pier onto the list of icons of England.

=== Fishing piers ===
Many piers are built for the purpose of providing boatless anglers access to fishing grounds that are otherwise inaccessible. Many "Free Piers" are available in larger harbors which differ from private piers. Free Piers are often primarily used for fishing. Fishing from a pier presents a set of different circumstances to fishing from the shore or beach, as you do not need to cast out into the deeper water. This being the case, there are specific fishing rigs that have been created specifically for pier fishing which allow for the direct access to deeper water.

== Piers of the world ==
=== Belgium ===
In Blankenberge a first pleasure pier was built in 1894. After its destruction in the World War I, a new pier was built in 1933. It remained till the present day, but was partially transformed and modernized in 1999–2004.

In Nieuwpoort, Belgium there is a pleasure pier on both sides of the river IJzer.

=== Netherlands ===
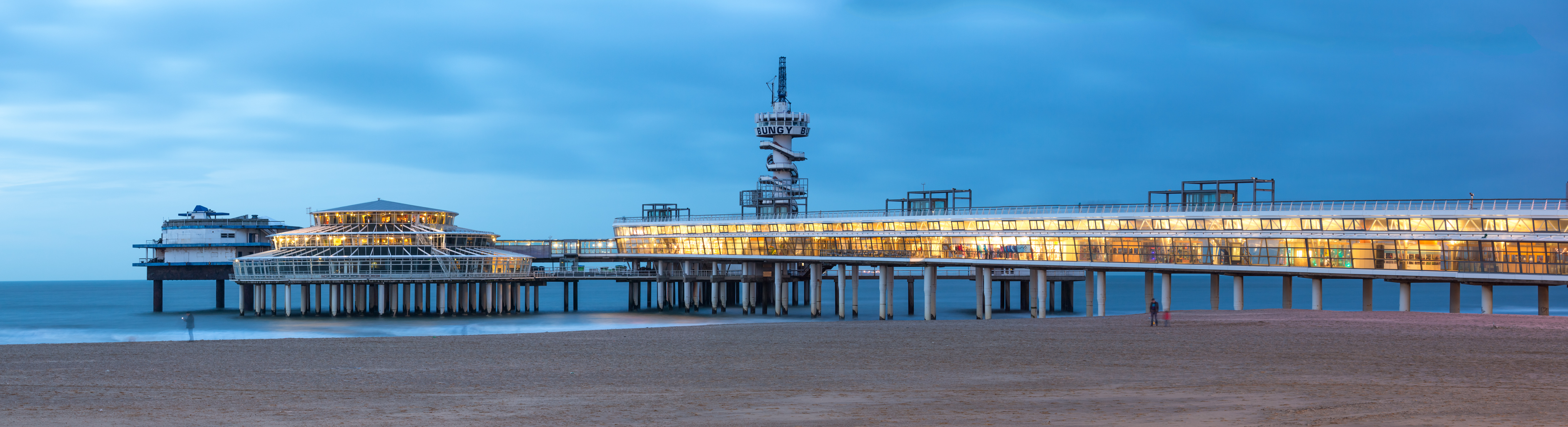
The Scheveningen Pier

Scheveningen, the coastal resort town of The Hague, boasts the largest pier in the Netherlands, completed in 1961. A crane, built on top of the pier's panorama tower, provides the opportunity to make a 60-metre (200 ft) high bungee jump over the North Sea waves. The present pier is a successor of an earlier pier, which was completed in 1901 but in 1943 destroyed by the German occupation forces.

=== United Kingdom ===
==== England and Wales ====
The first recorded pier in England was Ryde Pier, opened in 1814 on the Isle of Wight, as a landing stage to allow ferries to and from the mainland to berth. It is still used for this purpose today. It also had a leisure function in the past, with the pier head once containing a pavilion, and there are still refreshment facilities today. The oldest cast iron pier in the world is Town Pier, Gravesend, in Kent, which opened in 1834. However, it is not recognised by the National Piers Society as being a seaside pier.

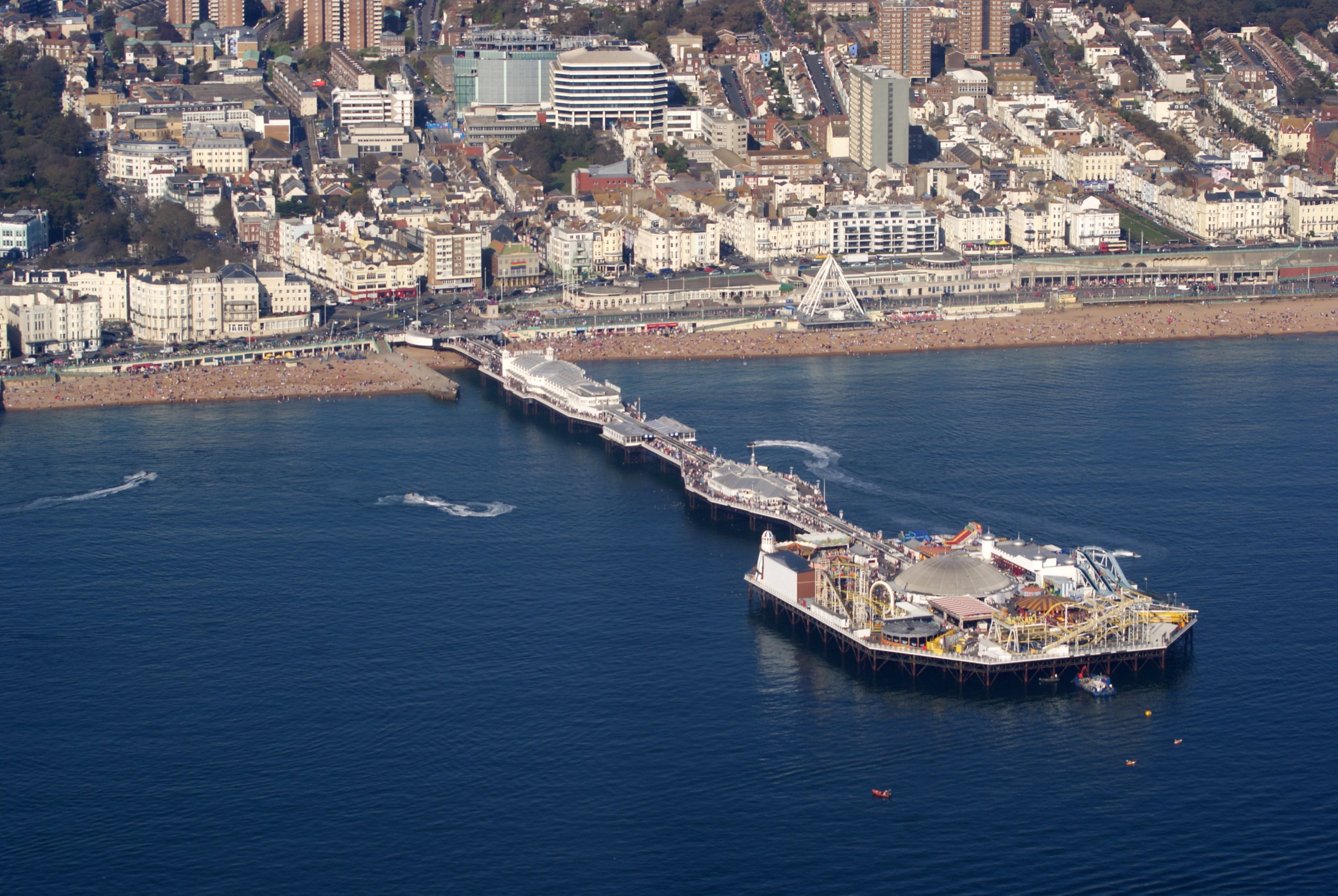
Brighton Palace Pier (pictured in 2011), opened in 1899

Following the building of the world's first seaside pier at Ryde, the pier became fashionable at seaside resorts in England and Wales during the Victorian era, peaking in the 1860s with 22 being built in that decade. A symbol of the typical British seaside holiday, by 1914, more than 100 pleasure piers were located around the UK coast. Regarded as being among the finest Victorian architecture, there are still a significant number of seaside piers of architectural merit still standing, although some have been lost, including Margate, two at Brighton in East Sussex, one at New Brighton in the Wirral and three at Blackpool in Lancashire. Two piers, Brighton's now derelict West Pier and Clevedon Pier, were Grade I listed. The Birnbeck Pier in Weston-super-Mare is the only pier in the world linked to an island. The National Piers Society gives a figure of 55 surviving seaside piers in England and Wales. In 2017, Brighton Palace Pier was said to be the most visited tourist attraction outside London, with over 4.5 million visitors the previous year.

== See also ==
- Boardwalk
- Breakwater
- Dock
- Jetty
- List of piers
- Seaside resort
- Wharf
