= Secret Boston =

American social-media company

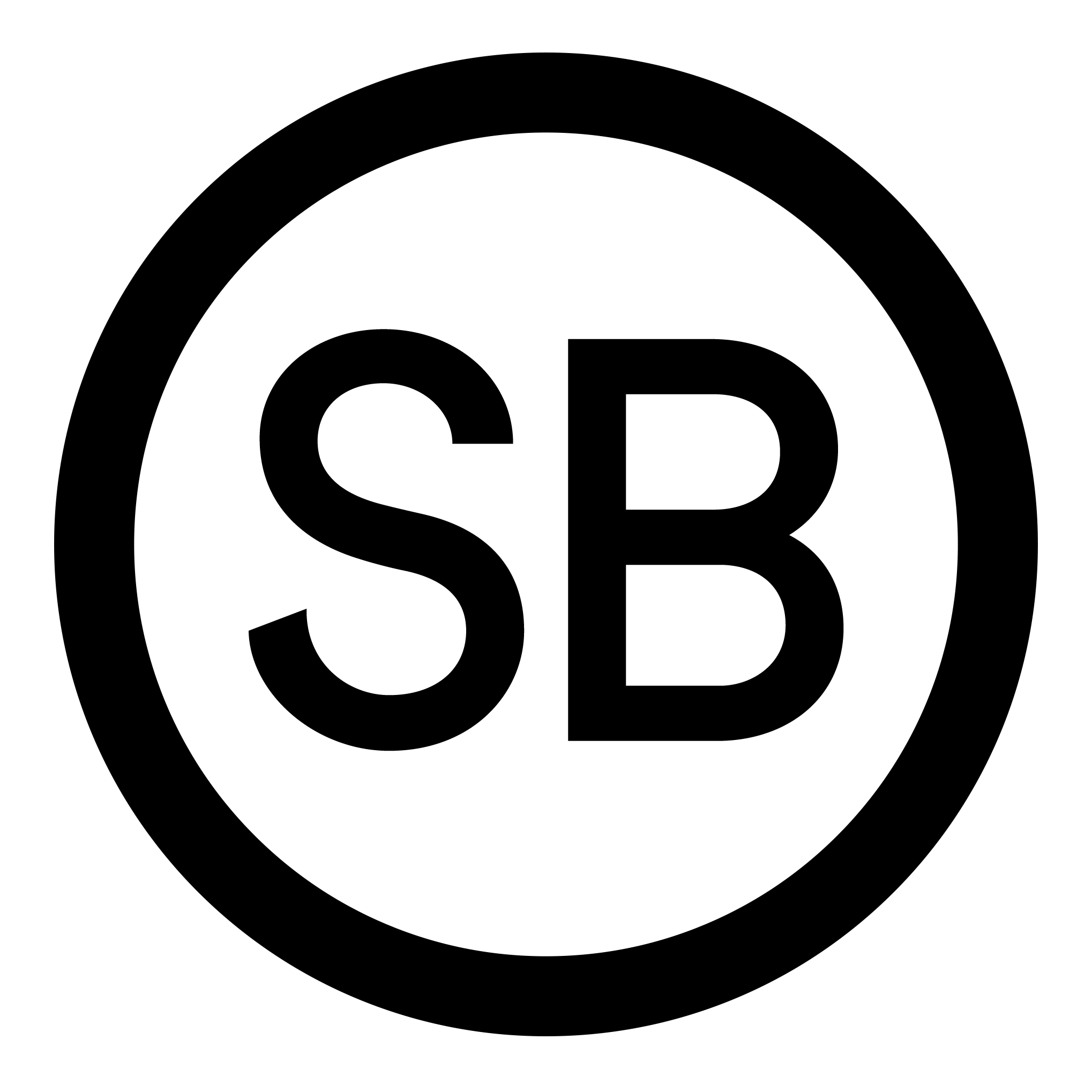
Secret Boston Logo

Secret Boston, LLC is an American social-media company. The company was founded in February 2010 by Michelle McCormack as a Facebook page and is currently an online and offline platform featuring Boston-related events, ideas, and people.

== Fashion's Night Out ==
In 2011 and 2012, Secret Boston was the official producer of Fashion's Night Out Boston (FNO Boston) an annual retail event started by Vogue Magazine in 2008 to encourage people to spend money and stimulate the economy after the 2008 financial crisis. For the first time in over 15-years Newbury Street was closed to traffic so shoppers could celebrate in the street. Secret Boston's founder introduced Mayor Thomas Menino on a stage built in the middle of Newbury Street to officially kick off the event. Participating retailers included Tiffany, Barneys, Copley Place, Newbury Street Association, and Faneuil Hall.

== Before I Die Wall ==
In 2012, Secret Boston along with the Ames Hotel spearheaded the installation of Candy Chang's "Before I Die Wall" on The Rose Kennedy Greenway to kick off Fashion's Night Out Boston. The unveiling was hosted by Secret Boston's founder and Ben Mezrich the author of The Social Network, the book about Mark Zuckerberg's creating Facebook that was made into a movie by director David Fincher.

== RedBull Flugtag ==
In 2016, Red Bull invited the Secret Boston community to participate in "Flugtag" a DIY aircraft challenge that took place at the Charles River. Six Secret Boston teams participated in building an aircraft prototype. One team, SPHINXTOR won and was and invited to fly their craft at the main event.

== COVID-19 ==
In March/April 2020, Secret Boston hosted a "Social Distancing Sing-a-long". Each day, Secret Boston published a daily playlist on Spotify and every night at 7pm housebound Bostonians throughout the city took to their windows and balconies to sing the songs together

== Controversies ==
In 2015, Secret Boston was accused of spreading a rumor that the band U2 would be playing at The Burren, a local Irish Bar in Somerville, Massachusetts. Hundreds of people and every local news outlet showed up and waited hours on the street for U2 to arrive. At midnight, the crowd dispersed when U2 published a Tweet that they would not be showing up. The following day, Secret Boston was criticised for using social media to manipulate their community with an unfounded rumor in order to gain attention.

In 2021, Secret Boston became embroiled in a conflict with an Alibaba backed European company called Fever who began using the "Secret Boston" name to sell tickets to Bostonians who believed they were buying the tickets from Secret Boston. On June 4, 2021 Boston Magazine published an article "The “Real” Secret Boston Is Spending $250,000 to Go to War with the Other One".

As of now, the companies are in litigation.
