= Red Bull Flugtag =

Event organized by Red Bull

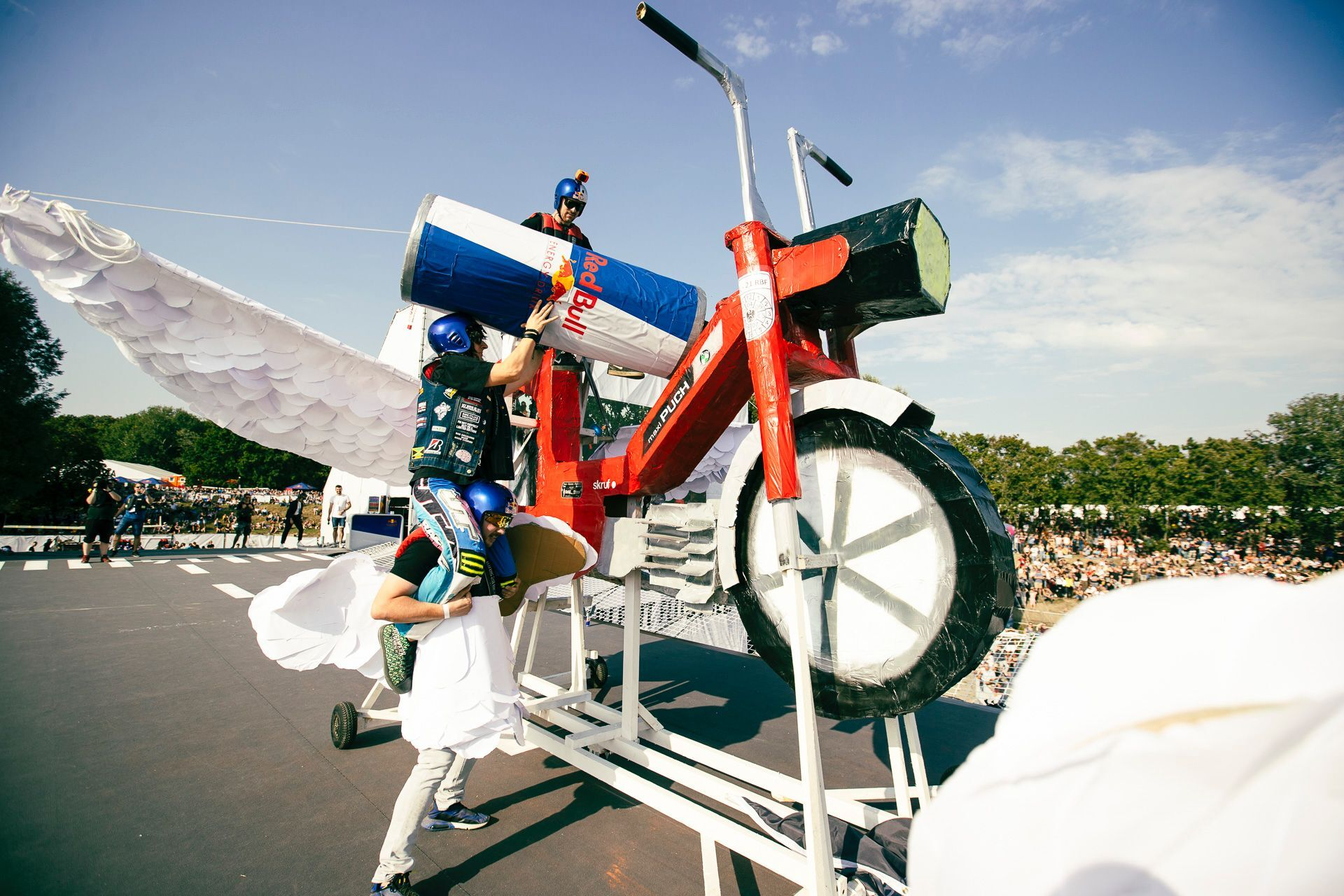
Flugtag 2021 at Vienna, Austria Flying Puch Maxi, Die Flügelmütter

Red Bull Flugtag (German pronunciation: [ˈfluːkˌtaːk], 'airshow' lit. 'flight day') is an event organized by Red Bull in which competitors attempt to fly home-made, human-powered flying machines, size-limited to around 10 metres (33 ft) and weight-limited to approximately 150 kilograms (330 lb). The flying machines are usually launched off a pier about 9 metres (30 ft) high into the sea or other body of water. Most competitors enter for the entertainment value, and the flying machines rarely fly at all.

== Background ==
The format was originally invented in Selsey, a small seaside town in the south of England under the name "Birdman Rally" in 1971. The first Red Bull Flugtag competition was held in 1992 in Vienna, Austria. It was such a success that it has been held every year since and in over 35 cities all over the world.

Anyone is eligible to compete in the Flugtag event. To participate, each team must submit an application and their contraption must meet the criteria set forth by Red Bull. The criteria vary with location. In the United States each flying machine must have a maximum wingspan of 30 feet (9.1 m) and a maximum weight (including pilot) of 450 pounds (200 kg). In Australian Flugtags the wingspan is limited to 8 metres (26 ft) and the weight (not including pilot) to 180 kilograms (400 lb). The craft must be powered by muscle, gravity, and imagination. Because the aircraft will ultimately end up in the water, it must be unsinkable and constructed entirely of environmentally friendly materials. The aircraft may not have any loose parts and advertising space is limited to 1-square-foot (930 cm^{2}).

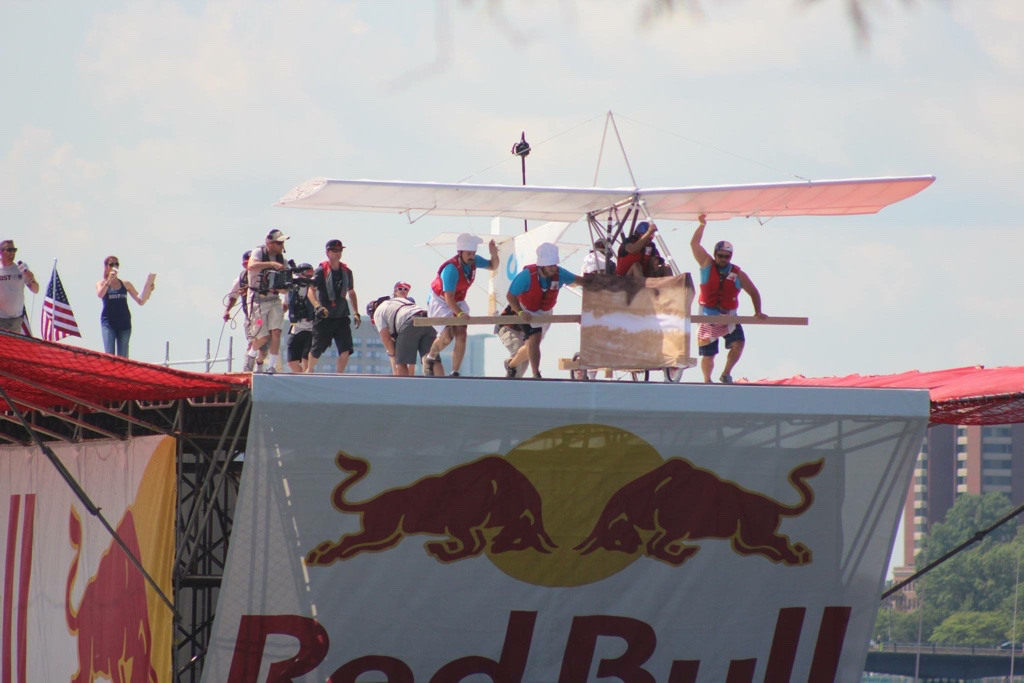
'The Boston Creme Flies' from Motus, LLC at the Flugtag 2016 in Boston, Massachusetts

== World records ==
=== Distance ===
The record for the longest flight is 258 feet (78.6 m), set on September 21, 2013, at the Flugtag in Long Beach, California, by "The Chicken Whisperers" team in front of a crowd of 110,000.

=== Attendance ===
The largest crowd was in Cape Town, South Africa with 220,000 attending in 2012.

== Results ==
Teams that enter the competition are judged according to three criteria: distance, creativity, and showmanship.

=== International ===
Country	City	Year	Date	Overall winner	Winning Distance	Description
South Africa	Johannesburg	2000				
New Zealand	Auckland	2002		Greatest American Hero	22 m	The winner was a Carbon fibre and mylar glider, pilot lying prone.
Croatia	Dubrovnik	2002		Stonebird	17.5 m	Catapulted pilot
Hungary	Sukoro	2002		Yunyai	45.3 m	human-powered aircraft
Belgium	Antwerp	2003				
Israel	Tel Aviv	2003		The Dragon from The Yarkon	10.5 m	Flying dragon
United Kingdom	London	2003	August 3			
Germany	Hamburg	2004				
New Zealand	Wellington	2004	March 14	Klinging On	23.5 m	Starship Enterprise
United Arab Emirates	Dubai	2005		Cre8tive 1	26 m	Polystyrene and aluminum
Slovakia	Bratislava	2005	June 26	Red Arrows Brno	32 m	Wooden frame, Polystyrene profiles, paper, all-moving ailerons
Czech Republic	Prague	2006	June 25	Easy Money 3	30 m	Wooden frame, Styrofoam and Fiberglass with all-moving tailplane
Canada	Vancouver, British Columbia	2006		The Big Shooter	26 m	Kevlar, aluminum, titanium, carbon fiber and mylar.
Netherlands	Rotterdam	2006		Aquaphobia	30 m	Aluminum sheets and wrapping plastic.
Brazil	São Paulo	2006	September 17			
Kuwait	Kuwait	2007	November 2	The Flying Stars	12 m	
United Arab Emirates	Dubai	2007	November 23	Snoopy vs. the Red Bull	21 m	Styrofoam, cardboard and Fiberglass flying wing with canard
Australia	Sydney	2008	April 6	Team Mullet	18.2 m	Giant Flounder on a fishing trawler (overall winners)
Turkey	Istanbul	2008	May 25	Flying Turkeys	26.9 m	
Poland	Poznań	2008	June 1			
United Kingdom	London	2008	June 7			
Russia	Moscow	2009	August 9			
Brazil	São Paulo	2009	August 15			
Colombia	Bogotá	2008	September 14	Piragua del Aire	8 m	
France	Marseille	2009	September 27	Savonus vs Virus	23.0 m	Household soap ("Savon de Marseille" in French) on a huge facecloth.
Ukraine	Kyiv	2010	June 19	Kuz'kina Mat'	12.0 m	The biplane with a cob of corn instead of the fuselage.
Hong Kong	Hong Kong	2010	October 10			
Kuwait	Kuwait	2010	November 5	Dragonfly team	11 m (Divas team)	Wood & Polystyrene
Ireland	Dublin	2011	May 22			
Israel	Tel Aviv	2011	June 3	Arigami	21.0 m	Polystyrene and aluminum.
Trinidad and Tobago	Port of Spain	2011	July 3			
Russia	Moscow	2011	August 7			
South Africa	Cape Town	2012				
Austria	Vienna	2012				
Germany	Mainz	2012	May 28	Don Canallie und seine tollkühnen Schurken	69,79 m (europe record)	Wooden Hang Glider
Kuwait	Kuwait	2012	October 19	Dragonfly team	18 m	Aluminum and Polystyrene
Singapore	Sentosa	2012	October 28			
Saudi Arabia	Jeddah	2012	December 13	TeamSaher	25 m	Foam, Wood and Aluminum
Turkey	Istanbul	2013	May 26	Angara Börds		
Ukraine	Kyiv	2013	June 2			
Serbia	Belgrade	2013	June 22	Flyin’ figuar	19.59 m	Aluminium, Polyethylene, PVC
Sweden	Stockholm	2013	June 30			
Russia	Moscow	2013	July 28			
Chile	Valparaíso	2014	February 8			
Hong Kong	Hong Kong	2014	May 11			
Portugal	Cascais	2014	September 6			
Russia	Moscow	2015	July 26			
India	Bangalore	2015	September 28			
Sweden	Gothenburg	2015	August 22			
Norway	Oslo	2015	August 23			
United Arab Emirates	Dubai	2015	November 27			
Italy	Milan	2016	June 19			
Peru	Lima	2016	June 25			
Bulgaria	Varna	2016	July 2			
Switzerland	Zürich	2016	July 16			
Hong Kong	Hong Kong	2016	November 27			
Russia	Moscow	2017	August 13			
Ireland	Dublin	2018	May 20			
Germany	Bremen	2018	July 1			
Australia	Sydney	2018	November 18	Chip off the Old Block	22 m	
Serbia	Belgrade	2019	June 30			
Russia	Moscow	2019	July 28	Time Flies		Runners up: Nine Eggs, Universal Twine
Istanbul	Turkey	2019	August 4	Coffee Lovers (La Marzocco Turkey)		Runners up: Mother Force, Vecihi Team
Russia	Moscow	2021				
Switzerland	Lausanne	2021	September 19			
Austria	Vienna	2021	September 26	Die Flügelmütter (member: Ribens, Tschesn King, Banbana, Dax)	12 m	Red Puch Maxi scale 3:1 with white paper angel wings. Material wood, carton
Turkey	Istanbul	2022	August 14	Red Kids On The Sky		Runners up: Suuuus'hi Team, Air Kiss
Taiwan	Taichung	2022	September 18	老闆，一個控肉刈包不加香菜不加肥肉 (member: 楊鎮濂, 徐寳璇, 黃俊穎, 蘇俊睿, 張東琳)	32.75 m	
Canada	Toronto	2022	September 24	Snappea Design		Runners up: DC3, THE MO SHOW
New Zealand	Auckland	2022	December 10	Red Barren and Snoopy (formerly Greatest American Hero)	47 m	Runners up: The Mighty Schizenhawken, Disco Far
Spain	Valencia	2024	June 2	Hillside Hustlers	26.7 m	
United States	Cincinnati	2025	August 9	Chapter	31.9 m	Runners up: La Barbacoa Voladora (13.7 m), Snowparty (18.6 m) Sustainability Award: Crazy Goat Garage

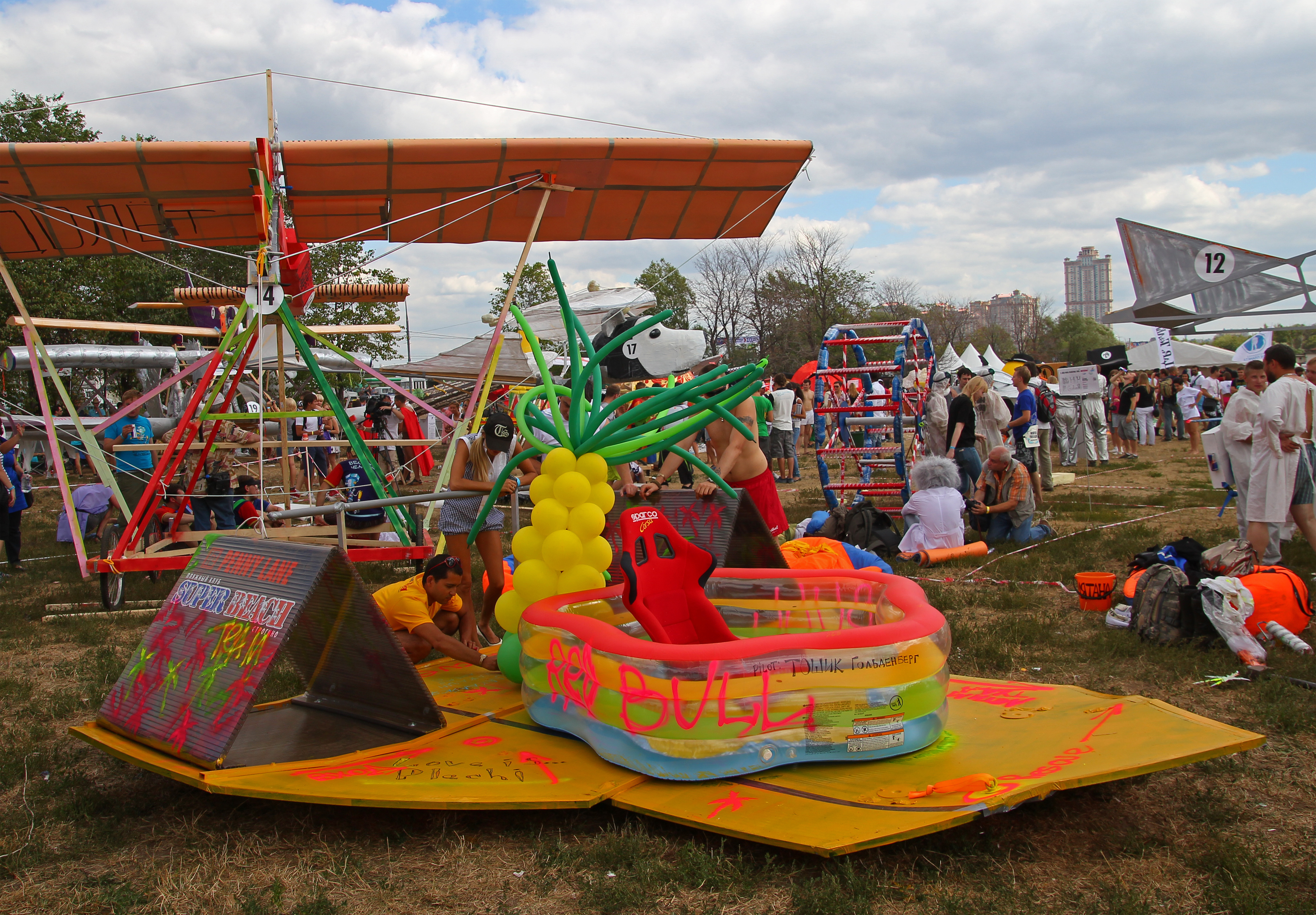
Red Bull Flugtag 2011 Moscow – participating machines 01

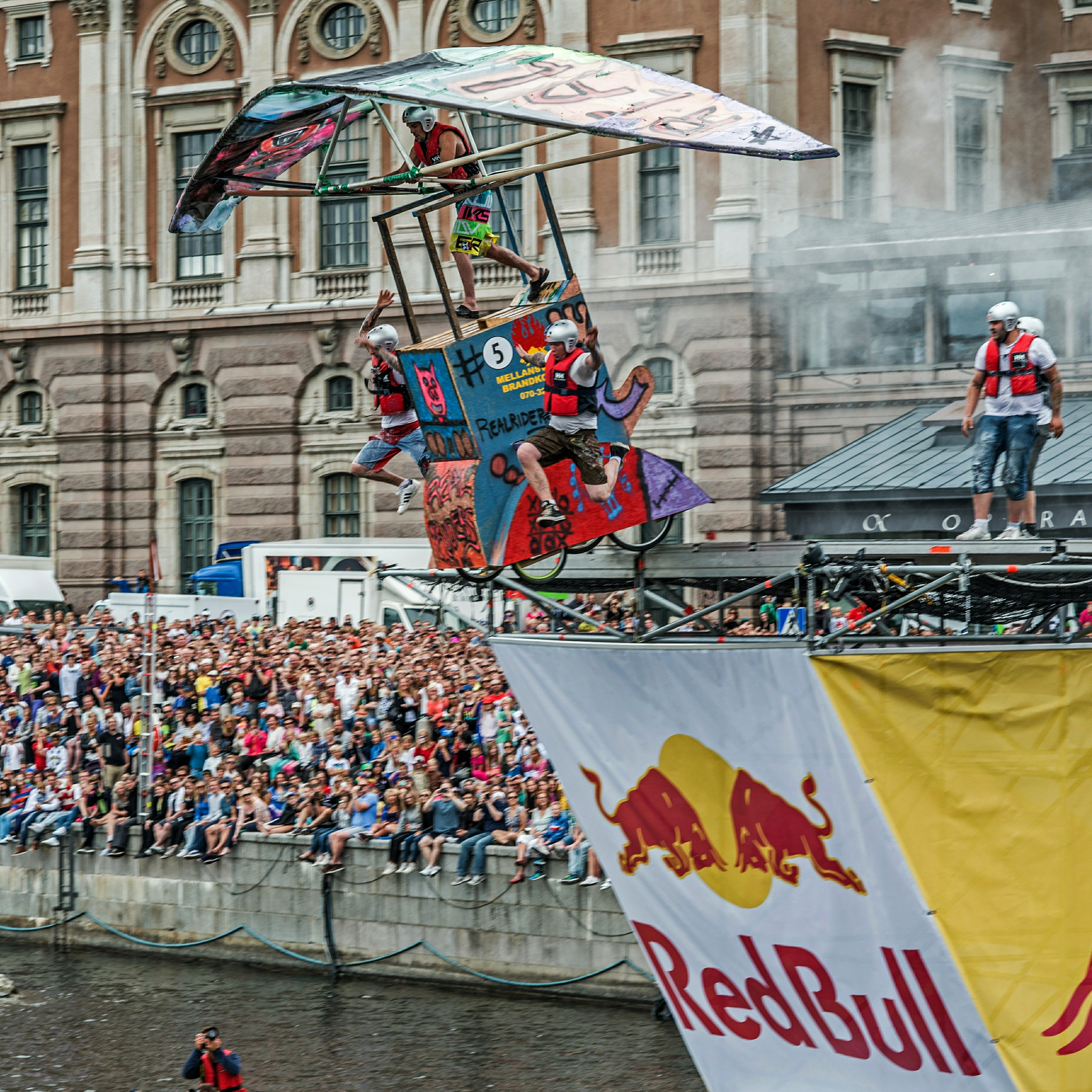
Flugtag 2013 in Stockholm, Sweden

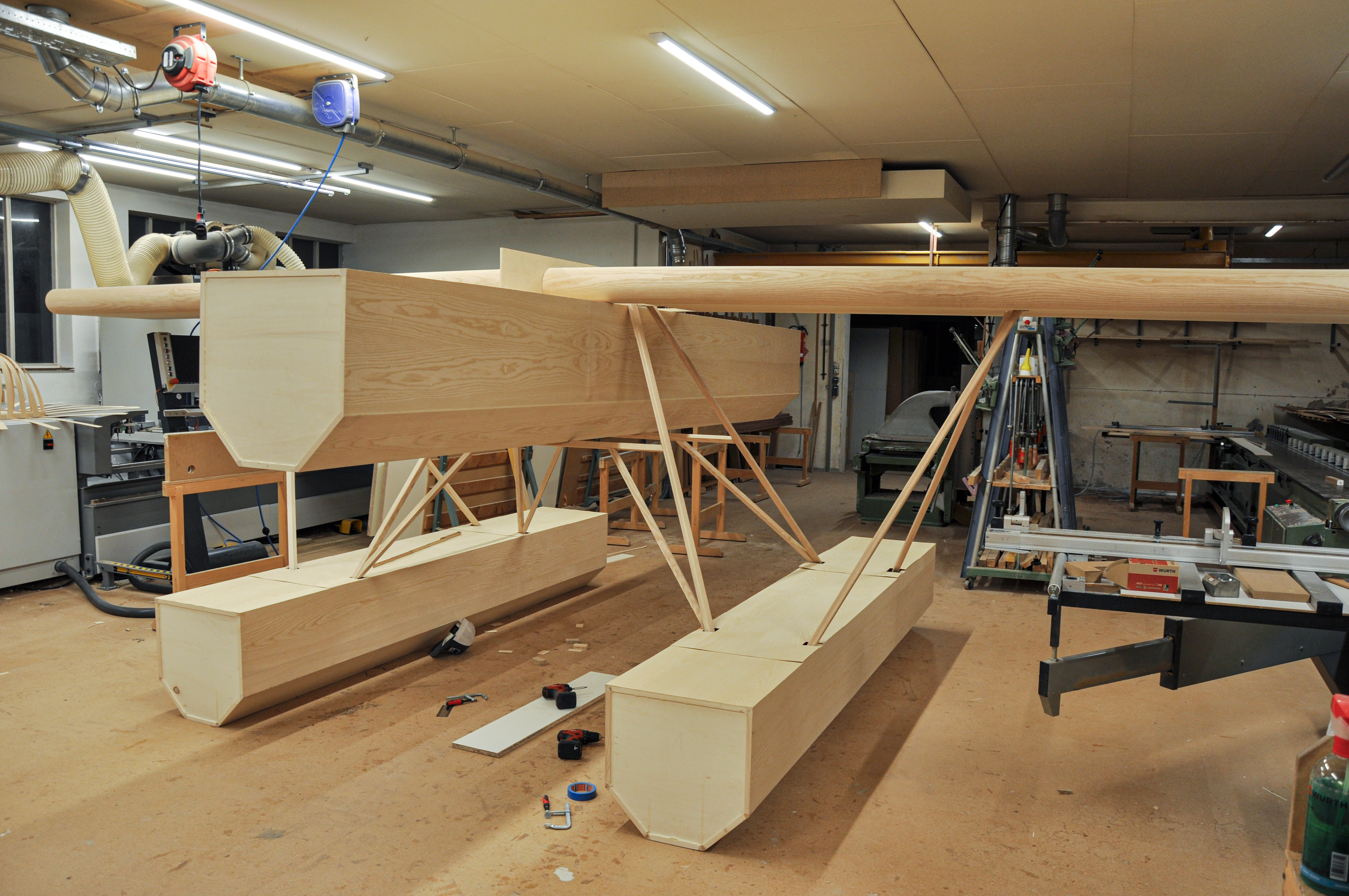
Die Bienenweide – the plane, built completely from wood at Flugtag 2021 in Vienna, Austria

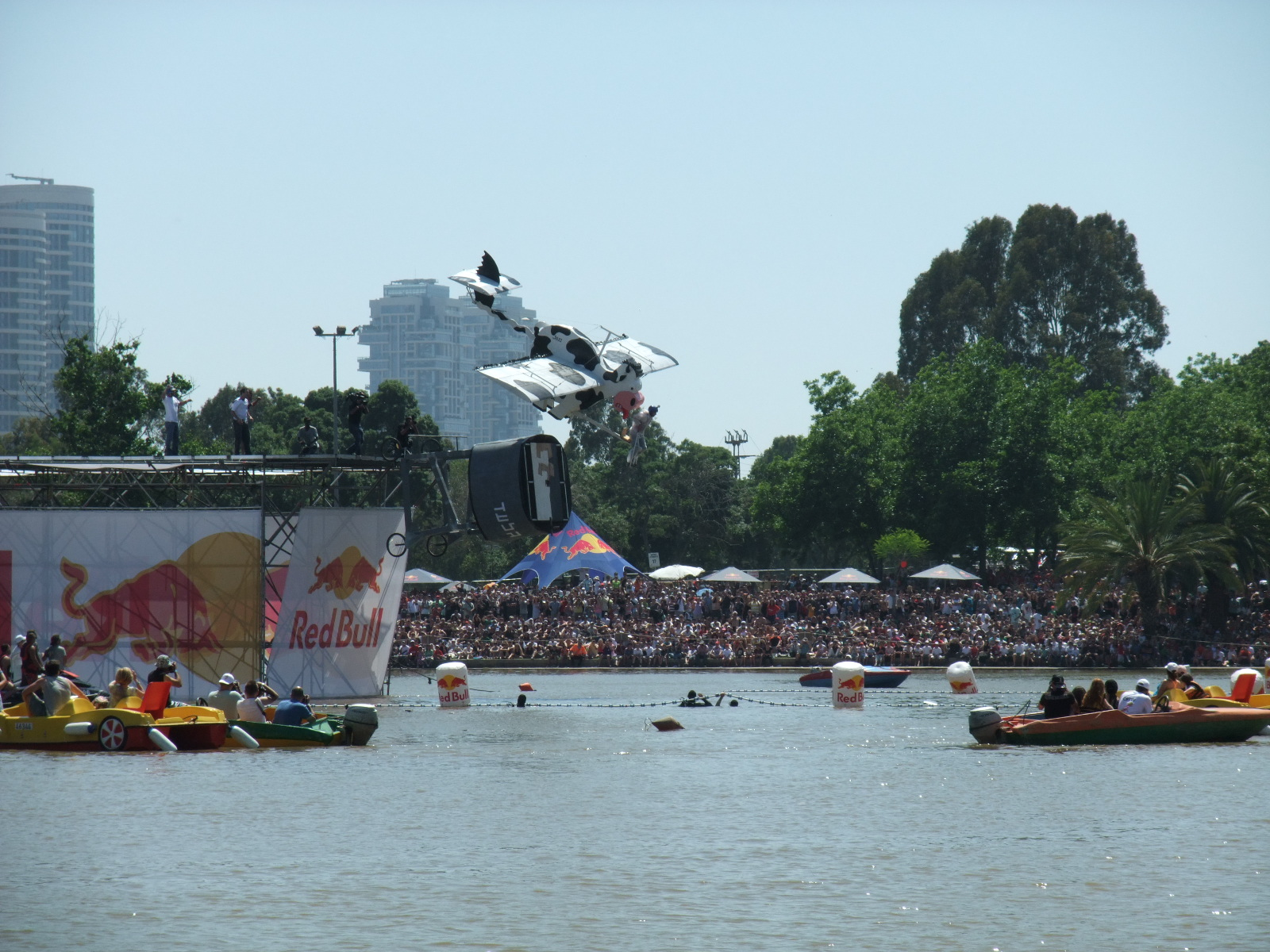
Red Bull Flugtag 2011 Israel – Kibbutz Gilad

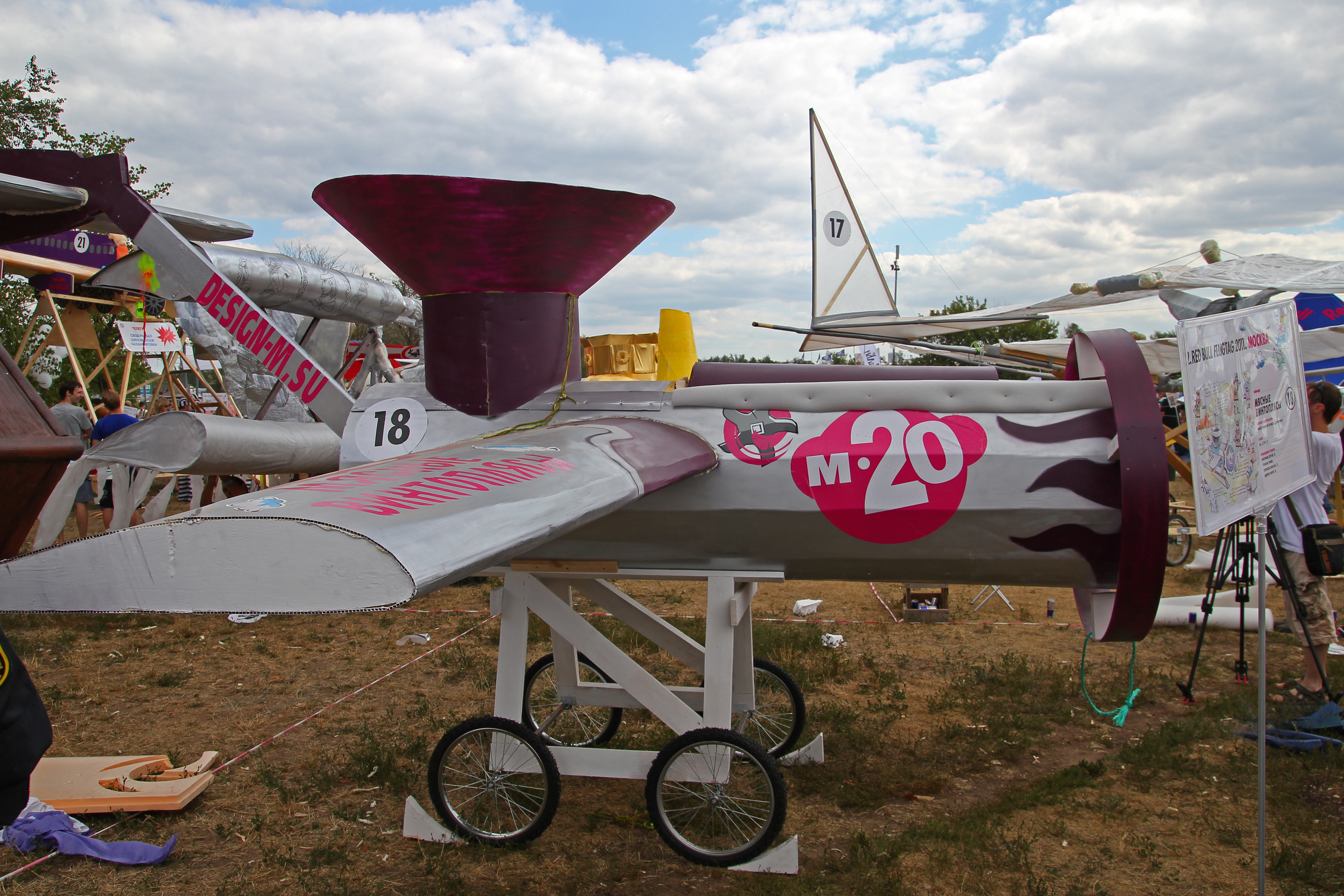
Red Bull Flugtag 2011 Moscow – participating machines 04

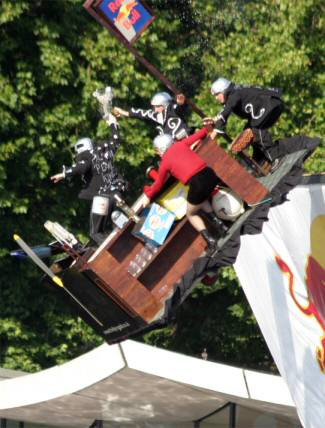
The 'Flying Pub' at the Flugtag 2003, Hyde Park, London

=== United States ===
Flugtag 2012 in San Francisco, participants being interviewed about their 'flying machine'

- Austin, Texas, Saturday, April 26, 2003
  - First Place: Pop and Fizz – 70 ft (21.3 m)
  - Second Place: Team Acme
  - Third Place: Winged Jalapeños
  - Most Creative: El Sombrerians
- Chicago, Illinois, Saturday, August 9, 2003
  - First Place: Sync, Swim or Fly – 51 ft (15.5 m)
  - Second Place: Jake and Elwood
  - Third Place: The Kicken' Chicken
  - Most Creative: Candy Flyer
- Los Angeles, California, Saturday, September 20, 2003
  - First Place: When Pigs Fly – 66 ft (20.1 m)
  - Second Place: West Coast Flying Machines
  - Third Place: The Marine Team
  - Most Creative: Red Bull Slugger
- New York, New York, Sunday, October 5, 2003
  - First Place: Pedal Power – 39 ft (11.9 m)
  - Second Place: Mighty Whirl
  - Third Place: Bammr's Ballistic Bedrock
  - Most Creative: Urban Rodeo
- San Francisco, California, Saturday, October 25, 2003
  - First Place: El Toro Guapo – 61 ft (18.6 m)
  - Second Place: Project S.T.O.L.
  - Third Place: Running of the Red Bulls
  - Most Creative: Snoop's Dogg House
- Miami, Florida, Saturday, April 24, 2004
  - First Place: The Resurrector – 33 ft (10.1 m)
  - Second Place: Three Finger Salute
  - Third Place: Believe It or Not (It's Just Me)
  - Most Creative: Joy of Birth
- Portland, Oregon, Saturday, July 31, 2004
  - First Place: 2004 X-Wing Glider – 39 ft (11.9 m)
  - Second Place: Flying Wonka Bar
  - Third Place: Oregon Santa Sleigh
  - Most Creative: Hair Force One
- Cleveland, Ohio, Saturday, July 31, 2004
  - First Place: Rover's Flying Glory – 63 ft (19.2 m)
  - Second Place: Aerobus
  - Third Place: The Stork
  - Most Creative: Flying Musical Sensation
- Tempe, Arizona, Saturday, April 29, 2006
  - First Place: The Need for Speed – 26 ft (7.9 m)
  - Second Place: Air Farce One
  - Third Place: El Vuelo Del Lobo
  - Most Creative: Dipsomaniacal Devil
  - People's Choice: El Vuelo Del Lobo
  - Farthest Flight: El Vuelo Del Lobo
- Baltimore, Maryland, Saturday, October 21, 2006
  - First Place: Victim's of Soi-cumstance – 81 ft (24.7 m)
  - Second Place: Jump the Shark
  - Third Place: F-10-75
  - People's Choice: 4-4-0 American Flyer
- Nashville, Tennessee, Saturday, June 23, 2007
  - First Place: Rocky Top Rocket – 155 ft (47.2 m)
  - Second Place: No. 1 Lucky Flyer
  - Third Place: Yellow Submarine
  - People's Choice: Galapagos Flight Club
  - Farthest Flight: Rocky Top Rocket
- Austin, Texas, Saturday, August 25, 2007
  - First Place: Skate and Destroy
  - Second Place: Superman's "Crip"tonite
  - Third Place: Billy Ocean's Flying Fish Taco
  - People's Choice: Congress Bridge Bats
- Tampa Bay, Florida, Saturday, July 19, 2008
  - First Place: Team Tampa Baywatch – 109 ft (33.2 m)
  - Second Place: Air Gilligan – 32 ft (9.8 m)
  - Third Place: The Little Engine That Could – 21 ft (6.4 m)
  - People's Choice: Tampa Bay Derby Darlins
- Portland, Oregon, Saturday, August 2, 2008
  - First Place: Team Yakima Big Wheel – 62 ft (18.9 m)
  - Second Place: Greased Lightning – 55 ft (16.8 m)
  - Third Place: Free Ballin'
  - People's Choice: Space Balls
- Chicago, Illinois, Saturday, September 6, 2008
  - First Place: The Crustacean Avengers – 120 ft (36.6 m)
  - Second Place: New Style Flyers – 75 ft (22.9 m)
  - Third Place: Pie in the Sky! – 90 ft (27.4 m)
  - People's Choice: The USHE
- Miami, Florida, Saturday, July 10, 2010
  - First Place: Team Formula Flug – 53 ft (16.2 m)
  - Second Place: Ibis Engineers
  - Third Place: One Giant Leap
  - People's Choice: Team TransPlace
- Saint Paul, Minnesota, Saturday, July 24, 2010
  - First Place: Team Major Trouble and the Dirty Dixies from Inver Grove Heights – 207 ft (63.1 m)
  - People's Choice: Team FORE Play from West Des Moines, IA
- Long Beach, California, Saturday, August 21, 2010
  - First Place: Team Peepin' It Real – 98 ft (29.9 m)
  - Second Place: Green Machine
  - Third Place: Airforce 1
  - People's Choice: Green Army Men
- Philadelphia, Pennsylvania, Saturday, September 4, 2010
- Tampa, Florida, Saturday, October 8, 2011
  - First Place: Willy Wonka's Amazing Flying Flugtag Adventure
  - Second Place: Adventure Team Bigstuff
  - Third Place: U.S.A. Team
  - People's Choice: Stumble Force
- Miami, Florida, Saturday, November 3, 2012
- San Francisco, California, Saturday, November 10, 2012
- Chicago, Illinois, Saturday, September 21, 2013
- Dallas, Texas, Saturday, September 21, 2013
- Long Beach, California, Saturday, September 21, 2013
  - First Place: The Chicken Whisperers – 258 ft (78.6 m)
- Miami, Florida, Saturday, September 21, 2013
- Washington, D.C., Saturday, September 21, 2013
- Portland, Oregon, Saturday, August 1, 2015
- Boston, Massachusetts, Saturday, August 20, 2016
  - First Place: Flite-Riot
  - Second Place: What Sphinx? (a Secret Boston team)
  - Third Place: Something Wonderful
  - People's Choice: Flite-Riot
- Louisville, Kentucky, Saturday, August 27, 2016
  - First Place: MMMad MMMax
  - Second Place: Dukes of Hazzardous by Kre8Now Makerspace – 82 ft (25.0 m)
  - Third Place: Kentucky Power
  - People's Choice: Mercy No Mercy – Mercy Academy
- Pittsburgh, Pennsylvania, Saturday, August 5, 2017
  - First Place: Flight at the Roxbury – 78 ft (23.8 m)
  - Second Place: Survivor Tractor – 121 ft (36.9 m)
  - Third Place: Left Field Loonies
  - People's Choice: The Flite Testers
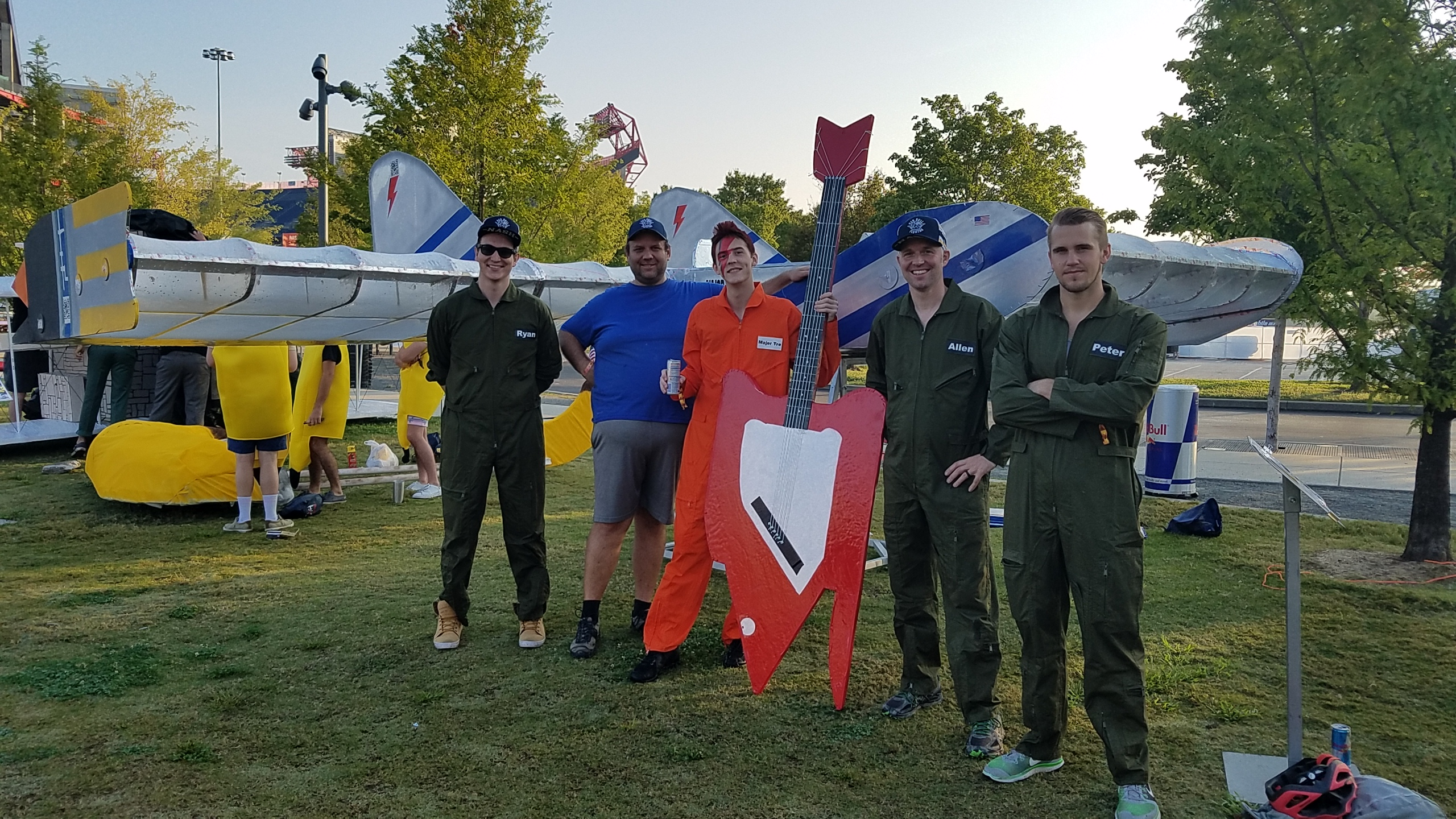
- Nashville 2017 First Place Winners – Team Ground Control
  Nashville, Tennessee, Saturday, September 23, 2017
  - First Place: Ground Control – 81 ft (24.7 m)
  - Second Place: His Majesties Royal Circus and the Flying Irish Woman
  - Third Place: YMCA
  - People's Choice: Team Smashville
- St. Paul, Minnesota, Saturday, September 7, 2019
  - First Place: Spooners' Revenge – 54 ft (16.5 m)
  - Second Place: Ferris Bueler's Takeoff – 63 ft (19.2 m)
  - Third Place: Flying POS
  - 24 Hour Greatness Award: Spooners' Revenge
- Milwaukee, WI, Saturday, July 16, 2022
  - First Place: Flight For Your Right to Party – 66 ft (18.9 m)
  - Second Place:
  - Third Place: Bear-Naked Chonkers
  - People's Choice: FLYING SCHMEAT
- Cincinnati, Ohio, Saturday, August 12, 2023
- Irving, Texas, Saturday, September 13, 2025
  - First Place: Flambouyancy 2: Flyboyant
  - Second Place: Charcoal Commanders
  - Third Place: 100 Men vs Gorilla

== Incidents ==
=== Serious injuries ===
- Bucharest, September 19, 2010: broken back, skull fracture
- Pittsburgh, August 4, 2017: ruptured spleen, traumatic brain injury
- Nashville, September 23, 2017: Lumbar vertebrae (L1)

=== Cancellation/termination by authorities ===
- The Portland, Oregon, competition, held on August 1, 2015, at Tom McCall Waterfront Park, wherein craft were launched into the Willamette River, was ended early by the United States Coast Guard after an excessive number of spectator boats (over 500) filled the river, making it impassable to commercial traffic. One collision was reported between a spectator boat and a commercial vessel, though damage was minimal and no injuries occurred.

== In video games ==
The Red Bull Flugtag is featured as a playable mini-game in a special "Red Bull space", called the Red Bull Beach, in PlayStation Home released on November 26, 2009.

== See also ==
- International Birdman
