= Birdman Rally =

Airsports competition

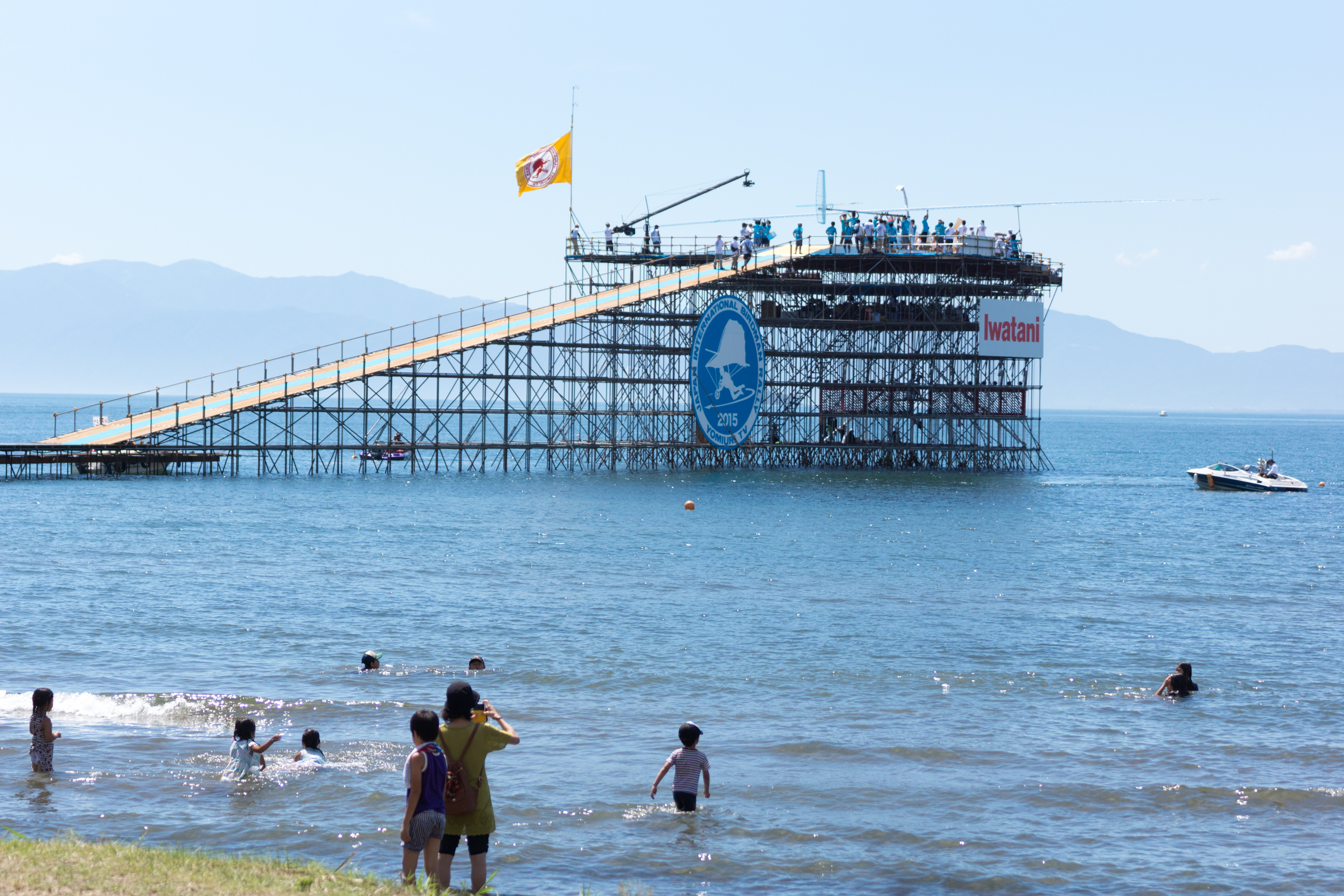
Japan International Birdman Rally 2015

Birdman Rally is a competition where members of the public build home-made gliders, hang gliders and human-powered aircraft, ranging from very serious aircraft to mere costumes, leap from a river- or seaside jetty, or from a bridge, and compete for distance and entertainment value.

Birdman rallies occur in multiple locations around the world, including Bognor Regis and Worthing in the United Kingdom, the Yarra River in Melbourne, Australia and Lake Biwa in Japan and in China, which has been created by regular entrants in the Bognor Regis event.

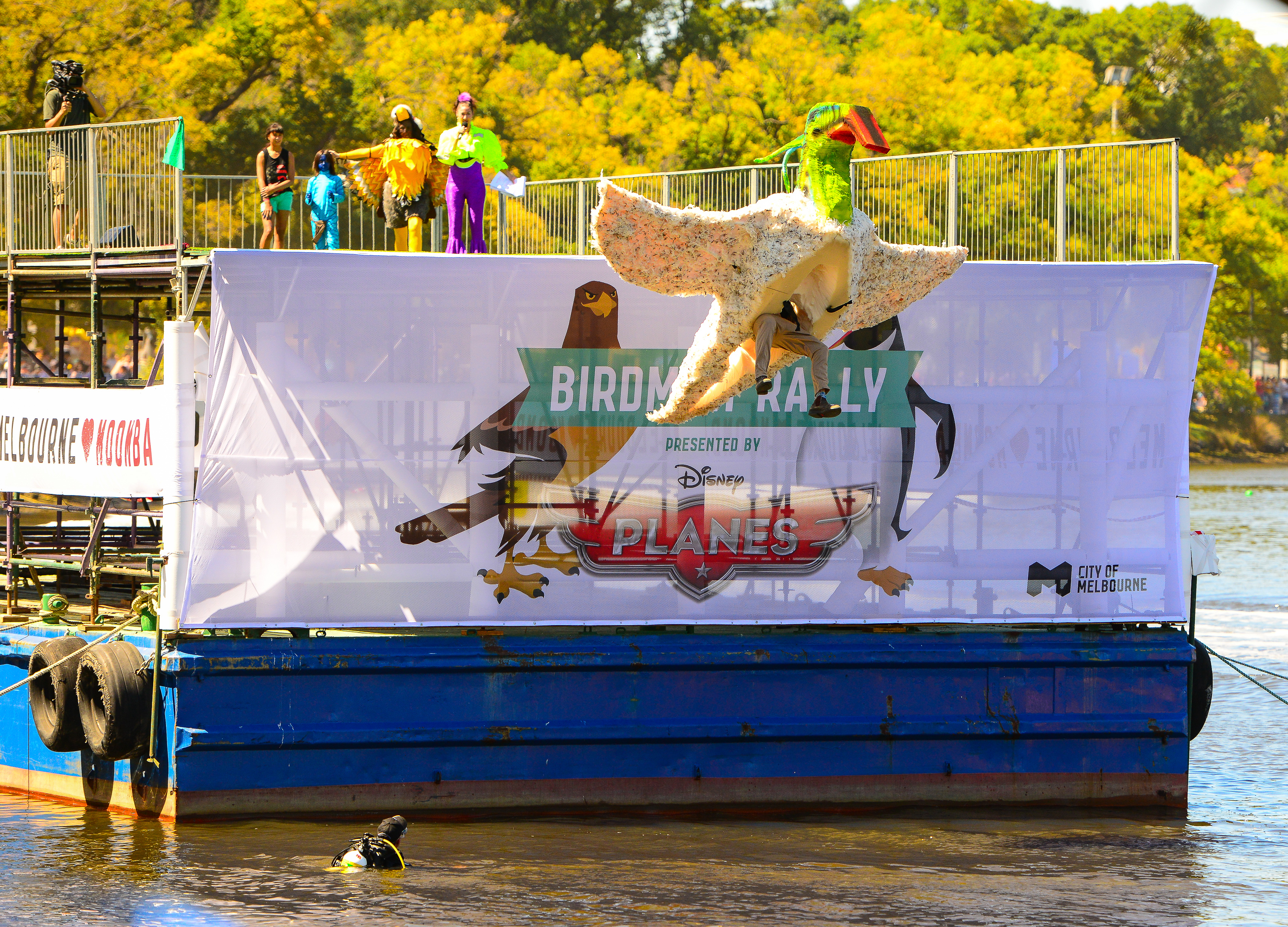
Moomba 2014 Birdman Rally

== History ==
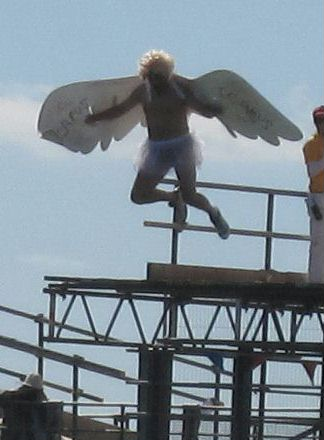
Bognor Birdman 2010

The oldest Birdman rally in the world started in Selsey, West Sussex, United Kingdom in 1971. Moved to Bognor Regis, where it was known as the International Bognor Birdman throughout the 1980s and 1990s, the event moved along the coast to Worthing in 2008 and since 2010 annual rallies have been held in both Bognor Regis and Worthing.

The Australian competition first started in 1972 in Glenelg, South Australia but now occurs as a part of Melbourne's Moomba festival in March.

Polygoonjournaal on the second edition of Vlieg er eens uit in 1974.

Starting in 1973, the Dutch edition (called 'Vlieg er eens uit') led to a series of TV shows called Te land, ter zee en in de lucht (On land, at sea and in the air) which ran until 2011. From 1977 onwards, the Dutch TV series not only featured a Birdman, but among others a bath tub race, walking on water and reverse gear car racing.

In New Zealand, the Birdman Rally ran from 1974 to 1979 and beyond including 2013, 2015, 2017, 2019. Festival organiser Martin Wilson ran them as an annual event on the Wellington Waterfront.

Started in 1977, the Japanese competition takes place every year in July, and the majority of competitors come from engineering programmes at universities. Known in English as The Japan International Birdman Rally the event takes place at Lake Biwa and since 1986 has had separate glider and human-powered divisions with the tournament record standing at a few hundred metres shorter than 70 km for the human-powered triangle course.

Since 1991, Red Bull has been holding its own Birdman Rallies under the name Red Bull Flugtag.
