= International Birdman =

Series of English competitions

International Birdman Series
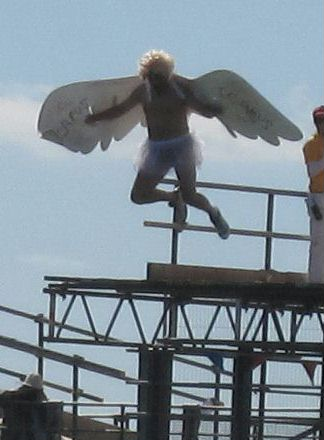
- Birdman at Bognor, 2010
- Genre: Birdman Rally
- Dates: First weekend of July and first weekend of September
- Locations: Bognor Regis, West Sussex and Worthing, West Sussex
- Years active: 1971–2016 (1971–1977 – Selsey) (1978–2007; 2010–2013; 2015–2016 – Bognor Regis) (2008–2015 – Worthing)
- Website: Bognor Birdman; Worthing Birdman

The International Birdman was a series of English competitions held in the West Sussex towns of Bognor Regis, Selsey and Worthing. The competition involved human 'birdmen' attempting to fly off the end of a pier into the sea for prize money. The event began in 1971 and was held on piers in West Sussex, on the south coast of England. First held in Selsey, the event moved to Bognor Regis in 1978. In 2008 and 2009 the competition relocated to Worthing Pier due to renovations of Bognor Regis Pier. From 2010 Bognor Regis and Worthing have both held Birdman competition, forming the International Birdman Series, which ended in 2016. It was the longest running Birdman Rally in the world.

== Format ==
The competition involves running off an elevated ramp of 20 to 35 feet high at the end of a pier and attempting to 'fly' the furthest distance. There was an initial prize of £1,000 for anyone who could travel beyond 50 yards (46 m). Since starting, the prize money and qualifying distance has increased and in 2009 at Worthing it stood at £30,000 for reaching 100 metres (330 ft). The competition is divided between serious aviators mainly flying hang-gliders (Condor Class), inventors with home designed and built machines (Leonardo da Vinci Class), and people in fancy dress with little or no actual flying ability (Kingfisher Class), raising money for charity.

== History ==
The event started in 1971 as the International Bird-Man Rally in Selsey on the coast of Sussex. The event was initiated by George Abel, as part of a fund-raising activity for the Selsey branch of the Royal Air Forces Association (RAFA) Club. Abel, a former RAF photographer, emigrated to Australia shortly afterwards, where he also helped to organise Birdman events.

In 1978 organisers were informed they could no longer use the pier at Selsey and the event was moved to Bognor Regis. By 1983 the competition had attracted European teams and the attention of the BBC. In 2008, because of the demolition of an 18 metre (60 ft) length of the end of Bognor pier, the 2008 Birdman event was not staged in Bognor, due to safety concerns over water depth at high tide being 13 feet (4.0 m) at the new end of the pier. The 2008 and 2009 competitions were held in Worthing as a result of the safety concerns. After safety checks in 2009 the water depth was cleared by the Health and Safety Executive as safe for competition. Events have subsequently been staged in both Worthing and Bognor Regis, creating the International Birdman series. Bognor's 2014 event was cancelled, but the event returned there in 2015.

Birdman competitions have also been held in Eastbourne, East Sussex.

== Recent events ==
In February 2016 the organisers of the Worthing event announced its cancellation for the foreseeable future. Bognor Birdman took place on 3 and 4 September 2016, although the second day's flying was curtailed because of safety concerns over high winds and choppy sea. International Bognor Birdman 2021 was cancelled due to the COVID-19 pandemic, but was expected to return in 2022.

== Winners and records ==
In 1984 Harold Zimmer from West Germany flew 57.8 metres to claim the top prize, which then stood at £10,000. By 1990 the record was 71 metres, the prize distance had been increased to 100 metres, and the prize money was £25,000. The prize money later stood at £30,000 for successfully reaching 100m, and for three consecutive years – 2013, 2014 and 2015 – that record was broken by UK hang gliding world champion Ron Freeman; his distance of 206.4 m (677 ft) at Bognor still stands. Ron Freeman passed away suddenly in November 2025.

Year	Bognor winner	Bognor distance	Worthing winner	Worthing distance
1978	George Cavarra	29.1 m (95 ft)		
1984	Harold Zimmer	57.8 m (190 ft)		
2007	Ron Freeman			
2008	Event not held		Ron Freeman	85.9 m (282 ft)
2009	Event not held		Steve Elkins	99.86 m (327.6 ft)
2010	Ron Freeman		Toby Quantrill	81 m (266 ft)
2011	Dane Norris		Tony Hughes	65.4 m (215 ft)
2012	Ron Freeman		Ron Freeman	85.7 m (281 ft)
2013	Ron Freeman	206.4 m (677 ft)	Ron Freeman	141.5 m (464 ft)
2014	Event not held		Ron Freeman	159.8 m (524 ft)
2015	Tony Hughes	88.5 m (290 ft)	Tony Hughes	106 m (348 ft)
2016	Ron Freeman		Event not held	

== Reviews ==
From 1994 until 2001, in Brighton, Eastbourne and Bognor Regis, Dod Miller immortalised these human birds with his Rolleiflex camera. Supermen, witches, dinosaurs, butterflies, ostriches, penguins and winged species of all kinds posed for Miller ready for their take off, armed with goggles and swimming flippers. Julie Bonzon in Dod Miller's Birdmen.

Photographer Dodik "Dod" Miller (born 1960) has said that a photograph of a birdman dressed as a knight in armour jumping off a pier was his best shot. He commented:

At Bognor and Worthing ... people would launch themselves off piers strapped into homemade contraptions – often in fancy dress – and try to fly. ... I don't know who the guy in this image is. There was metalwork involved in the horse, or dragon, or whatever it was, and it was on wheels. He started out riding on top of it like a knight in shining armour ... What I like about these pictures is that these are English eccentrics hoping to fly – with all the connotations of Icarus – and the joke is that they only go down, not out ... There was an array of bird costumes, of course. You'd see hats with propellers attached, while one guy tried to get a lift by holding massive bunches of helium balloons. It wasn't all men: there were some very brave women too. Many contenders are raising money for charity – and it's quite a height they jump from. I've seen people seriously winded. There's a boat to collect them from the water. Dod Miller in The Guardian, 6 July 2022

== 2009 Worthing distance controversy ==
In 2009, Steve Elkins flew the 100m course entering the water at the finishing markers. A £30,000 prize was offered to any competitor completing the distance. Organisers said that he had fallen at 99.8m, 20 cm short of the 100m marker. However, Elkins claimed that video footage showed he had exceeded the distance. Elkins took the event organisers to court, but in February 2014 a judge ruled against him, saying that he was ‘not satisfied’ that the competitor had crossed the mark.

== See also ==
- Red Bull Flugtag
- Birdman Rally
