= North Greenwich =

North Greenwich may refer to:

Current uses

- Greenwich Peninsula, a large peninsula in Greenwich
  - North Greenwich bus station
  - North Greenwich Pier
  - North Greenwich tube station, a London Underground station served by the Jubilee line
  - The O2 (Arena), also (rarely and in most formal usage) known as the North Greenwich Arena
- North Greenwich, Isle of Dogs, London a 19th-century name for a locality of the Isle of Dogs

Defunct meaning

- North Greenwich railway station, a disused station that served the above area
- North Greenwich (football ground), a now defunct stadium that was occupied by Millwall Athletic F.C. between 1901–1910
