= The O2 =

Entertainment district in central London, England

Coordinates: 51°30′10″N 0°0′11″E

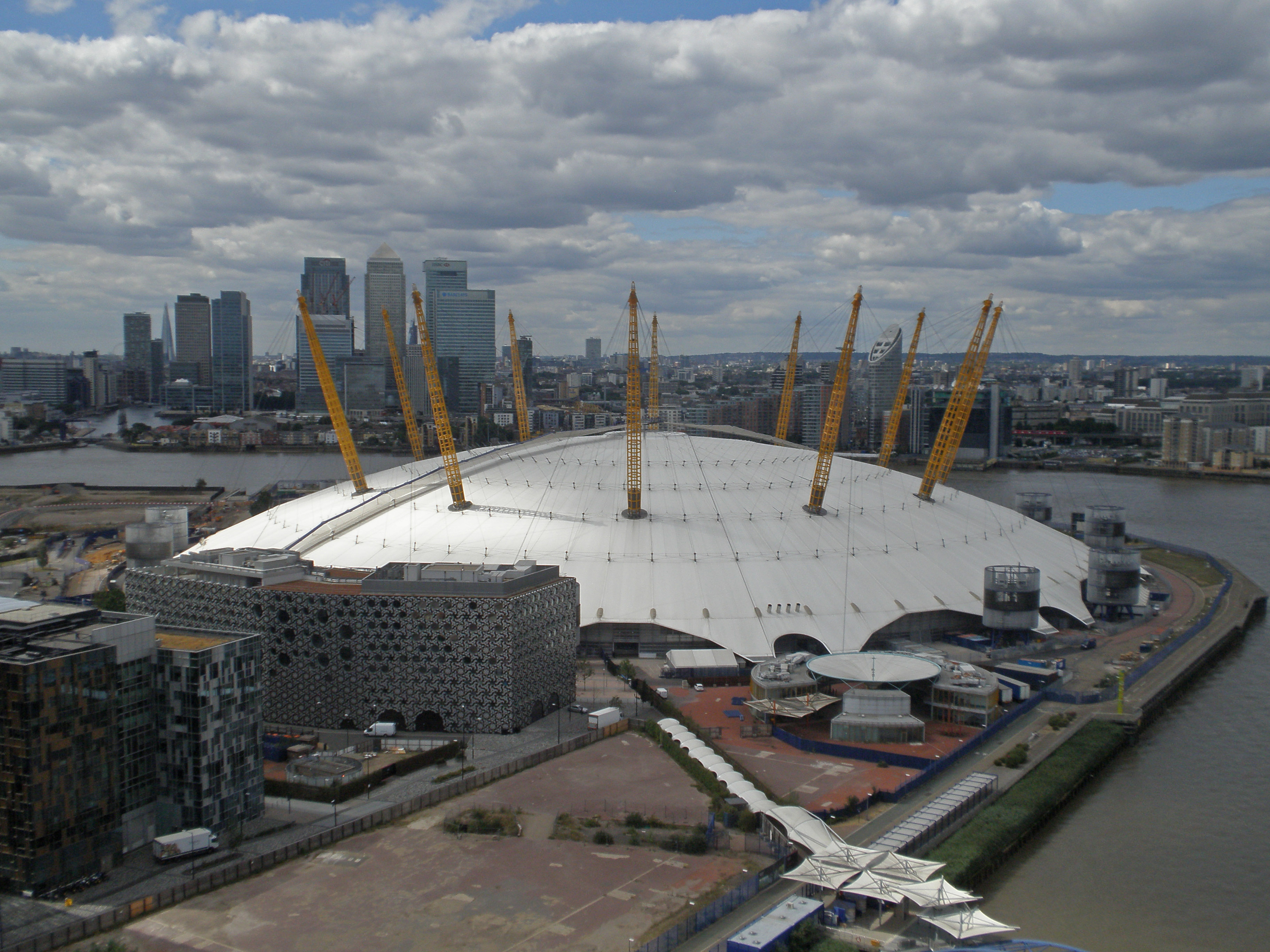
- The O2 pictured in 2013
- Former names: Millennium Dome (2000)

General information
- Type: Entertainment venue
- Architectural style: Dome/tent
- Location: Greenwich Peninsula; London, England
- Current tenants: Anschutz Entertainment Group
- Completed: 31 December 1999 (original usage)
- Opening: 24 June 2007 (current usage)
- Owner: Greater London Authority

Height
- Height: 52 m (central point within canopy); 100 m (steel masts)

Dimensions
- Diameter: 365 m (canopy overall); 320 m (internal canopy)

Technical details
- Structural system: Steel, tension fabric

Design and construction
- Architects: Richard Rogers (canopy); Populous (redeveloped interior)
- Structural engineer: BuroHappold Engineering
- Services engineer: BuroHappold Engineering (canopy); M-E Engineers (redeveloped interior)
- Awards: Royal Academy of Engineering; MacRobert Award

Website
- theo2.co.uk

The O2 is a large entertainment district on the Greenwich Peninsula in South East London, England, including an indoor arena, a music club, a Cineworld cinema, a bowling alley, an exhibition space, piazzas, bars, restaurants, and a guided tour to the top of the O2. It was built largely within the former Millennium Dome, a large dome-shaped canopy built to house an exhibition celebrating the turn of the third millennium; consequently, The Dome remains a common name for the venue. It is sometimes referred to as The O2 Arena, but that name properly refers to the indoor arena within The O2. Naming rights for the district were purchased by the mobile telephone provider O2 from its developers, Anschutz Entertainment Group (AEG), during the district's development. AEG owns the long-term lease on the O2 Arena and the surrounding leisure space.

Following the closure of the original Millennium Experience exhibition at the site, several proposals to reuse the Millennium Dome's shell were put forward but rejected. The renaming of the Dome in 2005 gave publicity to its transition into an entertainment district. The Dome's shell remained in situ, but its interior and the area around North Greenwich Station, the QE2 pier, and the main entrance area were completely redeveloped.

The area is served by North Greenwich tube station on the Jubilee line, which was opened just before the Millennium Exhibition, and by bus routes. Thames Clippers operates a riverboat service for London River Services; the present tenants, AEG, purchased Thames Clippers to provide river links between central London and The O2. As well as a commuter service, Thames Clippers operates the O2 Express service. Local buses also serve the station and the nearby O2.

On 23 February 2017, O2 announced that they had agreed to a deal with AEG to maintain the naming rights of The O2 for a further 10 years until 2027.

== The tent ==
The dome-shaped structure, which now houses The O2's Entertainment Avenue and arena, was originally constructed as the Millennium Dome and hosted the Millennium Experience, a major exhibition celebrating the start of the third millennium. The exhibition opened to the public on 1 January 2000 and ran until 31 December 2000; however, the project and exhibition was the subject of considerable political controversy and it did not attract the number of visitors anticipated, leading to recurring financial problems.

On 18 February 2022, due to Storm Eunice, the tent of The O2 was damaged, with the fibre-glass canopy covering the roof being partially torn off by high winds of up to 100 mph (160 km/h) in London.

== Background to development ==
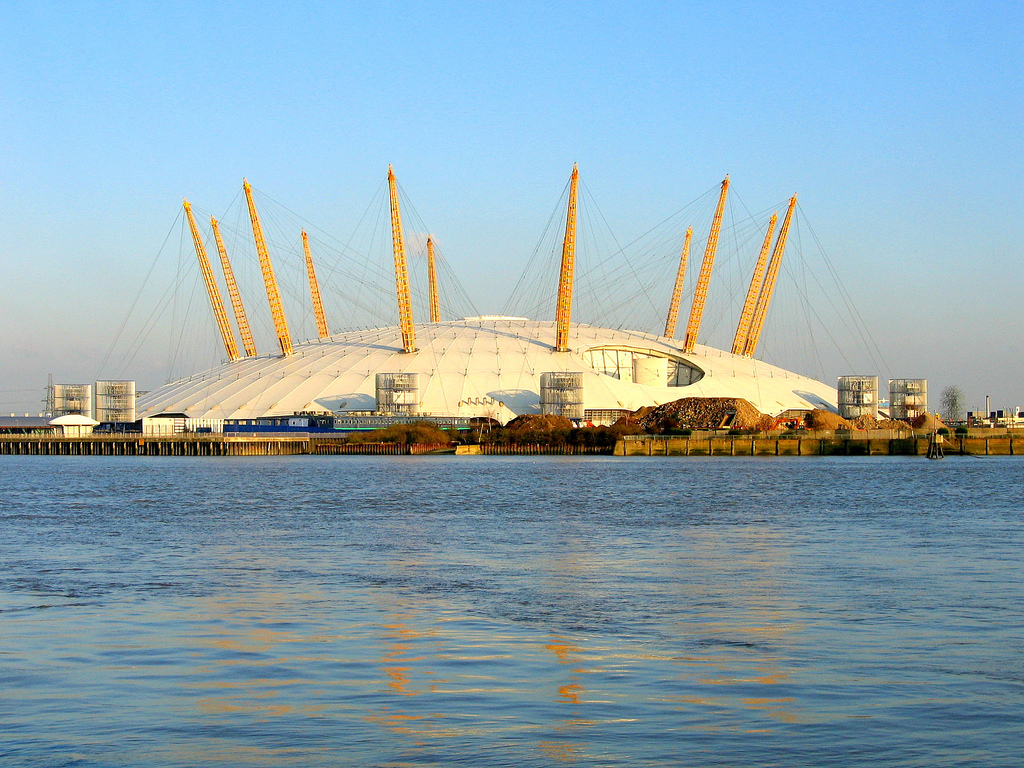
The O2 in 2004, when it was the Millennium Dome

In December 2001, the government announced that Meridian Delta had been chosen to develop the Dome as a sports and entertainment centre. Meridian Delta, a subsidiary of Quintain and Lendlease, signed a 999-year lease for the Dome with the government and English Partnerships, a UK governmental body for national regeneration which was assigned the regeneration of the Greenwich Peninsula.

The Dome was sub-leased to Anschutz Entertainment Group (AEG) for 58 years. AEG would develop and operate The O2 during the length of the lease, while the government was entitled to a 15% share of profits for 25 years. The O2 was developed inside the Dome structure by AEG to a design by Populous and Buro Happold at a cost of £350 million.

In 2008, the functions of English Partnerships were transferred to the Homes & Communities Agency, and in 2009, Quintain and Lend Lease sold their interest in Meridian Delta to Trinity College, Cambridge for £24 million.

As part of the investment programme, naming rights were sold to O2; 'The O2' became the project's official name on 25 May 2005. In 2017, O2's name sponsorship was extended for a further ten years. The £6 million per year deal between O2 and AEG included priority tickets and reserved VIP accommodation for O2 mobile customers. The service was also made available to premium ticket holders. O2 started talks with AEG in 2005 to have its logo and branding placed on the roof of the dome, but this did not take place.

AEG have stated that they wish to abolish the 'Dome' name due to its reputation as a failed project, being tagged as 'The White Elephant.' Since its opening, there have been signs of the press and public calling it The O2. It is currently the largest entertainment district in London. To mark its opening, AEG spent £6.5 million on a mass advertising campaign, led by VCCP, throughout Europe to promote The O2.

=== Construction ===
The development took the form of new buildings constructed inside the dome structure. The dome structure was not changed as part of the construction, except for blue lights added to the support poles and plasma displays added to some of the large sculptures around the dome. Construction started with the arena roof, which was built on the ground and then raised, as cranes could not be used within the dome. The construction then moved on to the arena building itself and the entertainment avenue surrounding it. A wide pathway between North Greenwich station and The O2 was also built, along with the Peninsula Square piazza in front of the dome for special events. A glass roof was built over part of the pathway so that people can walk from the station to The O2 without getting wet in the rain. A covered path was also built between the QE2 Pier and The O2's main entrance. Buro Happold provided structural engineering for the project. The main civil engineering and construction contract for the development was awarded to Sir Robert McAlpine. Watson Steel Structures provided engineering for the 4,500 tonne arena roof. M-E Engineers were the building services engineers for the project. T. Clarke were the electrical contractors.

OR Consulting engineers set up a few interactive exhibitions within The O2. Keller Ground engineering prepared the ground for construction. Special ground preparation was necessary due to contaminated soils from industrial activities at the site prior to the dome. Catalytic converters were also installed within the dome to prevent toxic gases from forming, with the dome structure left in place. The plant cylinders, which contained service equipment and some piles used for the original dome, were reused. Financial consulting was provided by WT Partnership and EC Harris. The Waterfront partnership provided legal support for the development and continues to do so for The O2. Kerzner International helped with the development of the entertainment venues.

=== Super casino proposals ===
Anschutz planned to build a super casino as one of the attractions, which would lead to further development of the area. The casino was to be developed and operated by Kerzner International. The association of the British Deputy Prime Minister, John Prescott, with Philip Anschutz, head of the entertainment group, gave rise to political controversy, with allegations that Prescott may have used undue influence to support Anschutz's casino licence bid. Prescott had met Anschutz on several occasions and stayed at his ranch for a few days. In August 2006, it was reported that construction of the shell of The O2's casino site had already started. In January 2007, the single-trial license for a British super casino was granted to Manchester. Consequently, AEG announced that the casino would not be built in the near future, and that there would not be enough investment for a high-rise hotel, designed by Richard Rogers, as well as a theatre, a cable car from Canary Wharf, and an extended development that was planned adjacent to the dome.

=== Outlet Shopping ===
In late 2018, AEG, in association with property firm Crosstree Real Estate Partners, opened a premium retail outlet at the O2, called the Icon Outlet. The centre, which 'completes the loop' at the venue, is set over 210,000 sq. feet and takes up a section of the O2 that was previously intended to house a supercasino.

The new shopping centre opened its doors in October 2018 with thirty stores; however, that number has since increased to over 60. Brands at the Icon Outlet include Levi's, Ted Baker, Asics, Søstrene Grene, Hotel Chocolat, Adidas, Nike, Hackett, Superdry, Clarins, Tommy Hilfiger, Skechers and Jack Wills. The venue also includes a cafe (Cloud Nine), a store that organises sample sales (Showcase.co.)

In August 2023, the Icon name was dropped, with the shopping centre now known as Outlet Shopping at The O2.

=== Potential developments ===
In late 2007, marine engineering consultancy Beckett Rankine was appointed to investigate the possibility of a cruise ship terminal being built.

In 2012, it was reported that the O2 would be sold by its owners AEG, as part of the disposal of the entire company's assets, rumoured to be valued at around $7 billion.

== Opening ==
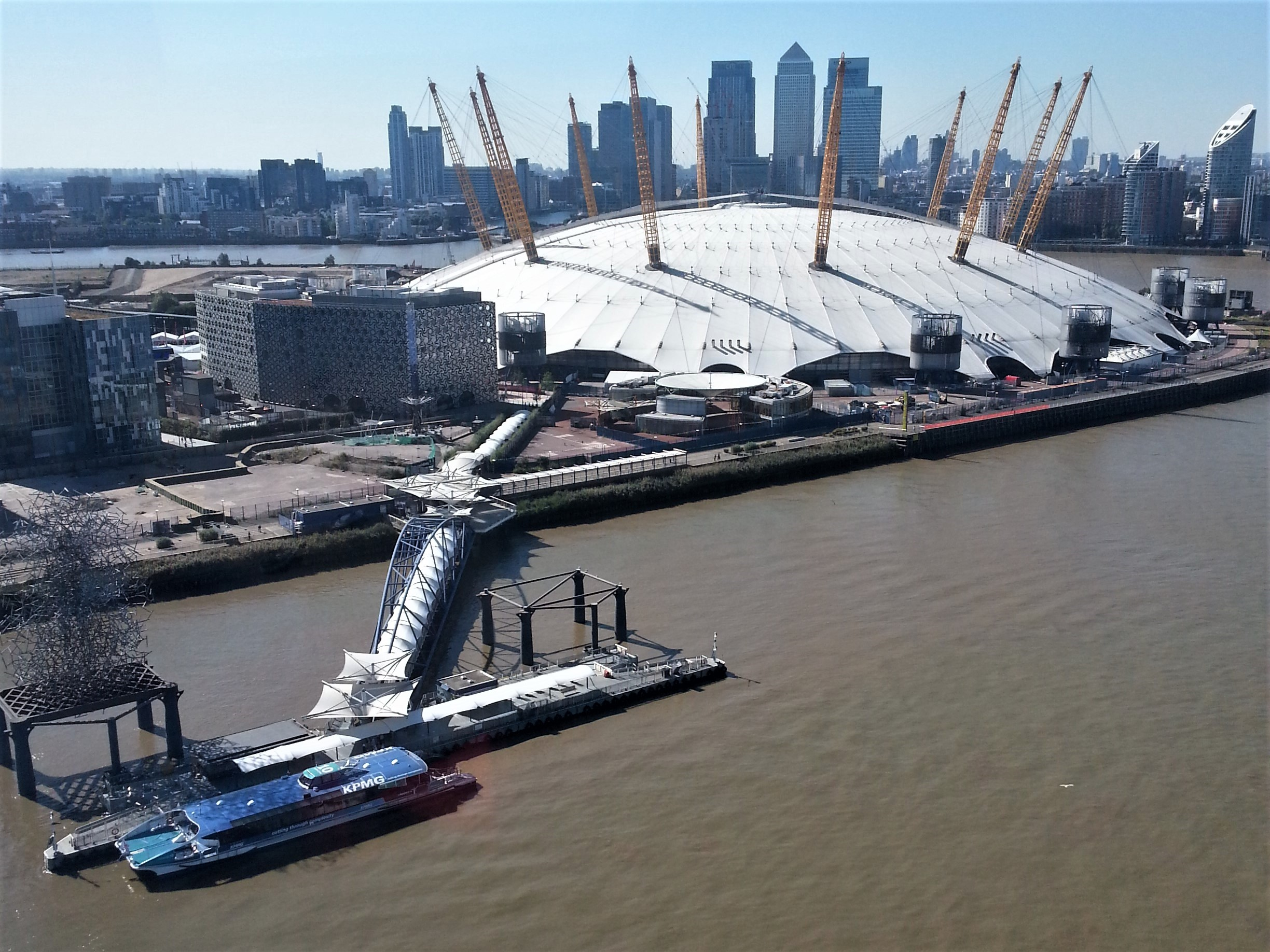
The O2 in 2012, with Canary Wharf in the background

The venue, rebranded The O2, was reopened to the public on 24 June 2007 with a concert by Bon Jovi in the arena. The O2 celebrated its first year with a book, including a double-page picture of Elton John from his September 2007 Red Piano show. Prior to this reopening, other events took place, including a soft opening for residents of the area to explore the entertainment district and an opening for staff called "The O2 Premiere" which featured Peter Kay, Tom Jones, Kaiser Chiefs and Basement Jaxx. An event called "Out of the Blue" featuring circus acts also took place on the day of the public opening, as part of the Greenwich Festival.

== Facilities ==
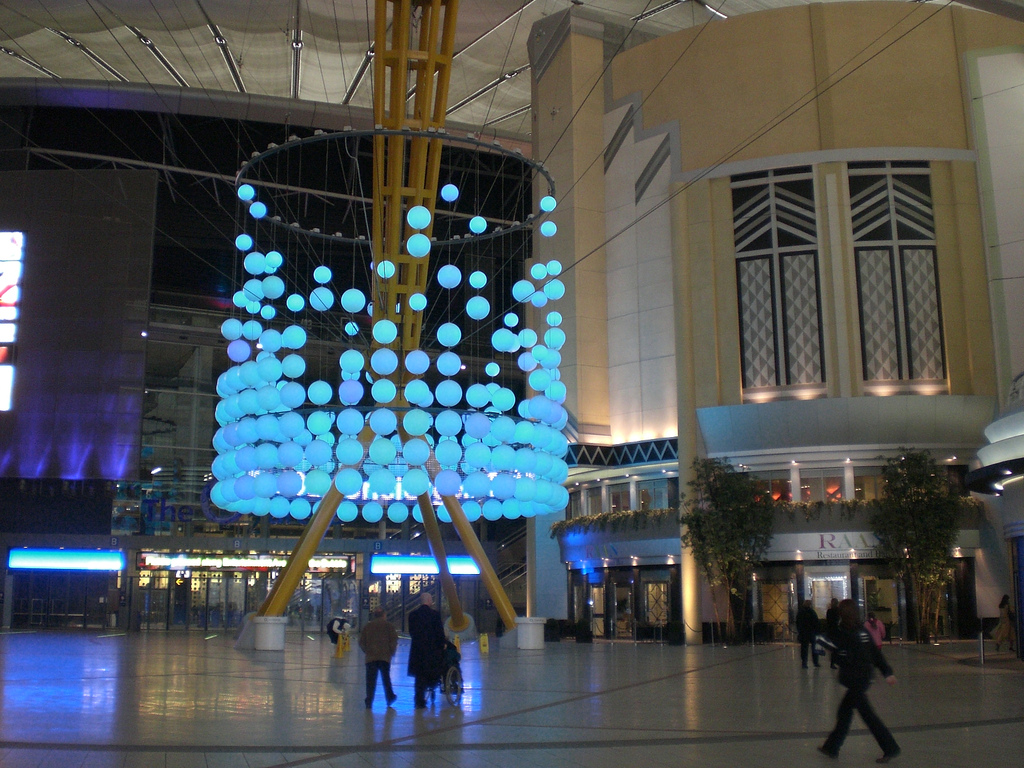
The O2 concourse. The arena entrance is visible in the background. Designed by Jordan Parnass Digital Architecture.

Various buildings are housed within the dome structure, including an arena, known as The O2 Arena, a smaller venue, Indigo at The O2, Hollywood Bowl, Cineworld, Virgin Media Gamepad, and an Entertainment Avenue consisting of various restaurants and bars. A new shopping outlet opened in 2018. Backstage, there is also a VIP club lounge, operations rooms, a media centre with high definition facilities, and a number of dressing rooms, as well as a VIP entrance/exit for performers.

All the venues in the complex use the latest lighting, sound, and security technology, including RFID smart card tagging of staff and VIP guests, and digitally managed sound. There are four computer server rooms to provide this technology.

The complex is also covered by CCTV and security personnel. Arena visitors and their bags are screened with X-ray machines and metal detectors at the main entrance.

=== The O2 Arena ===
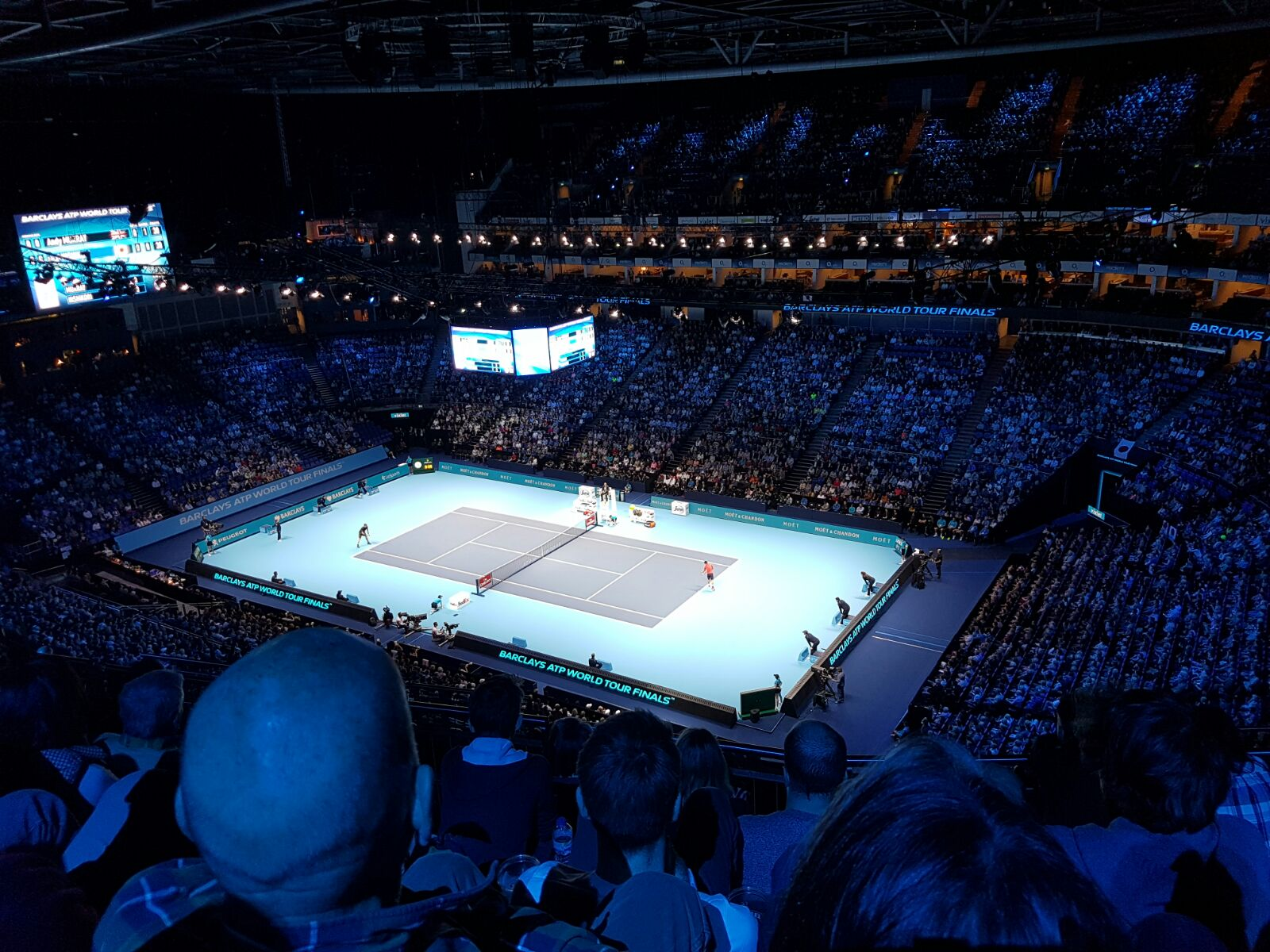
O2 Arena during the ATP World Tour Finals

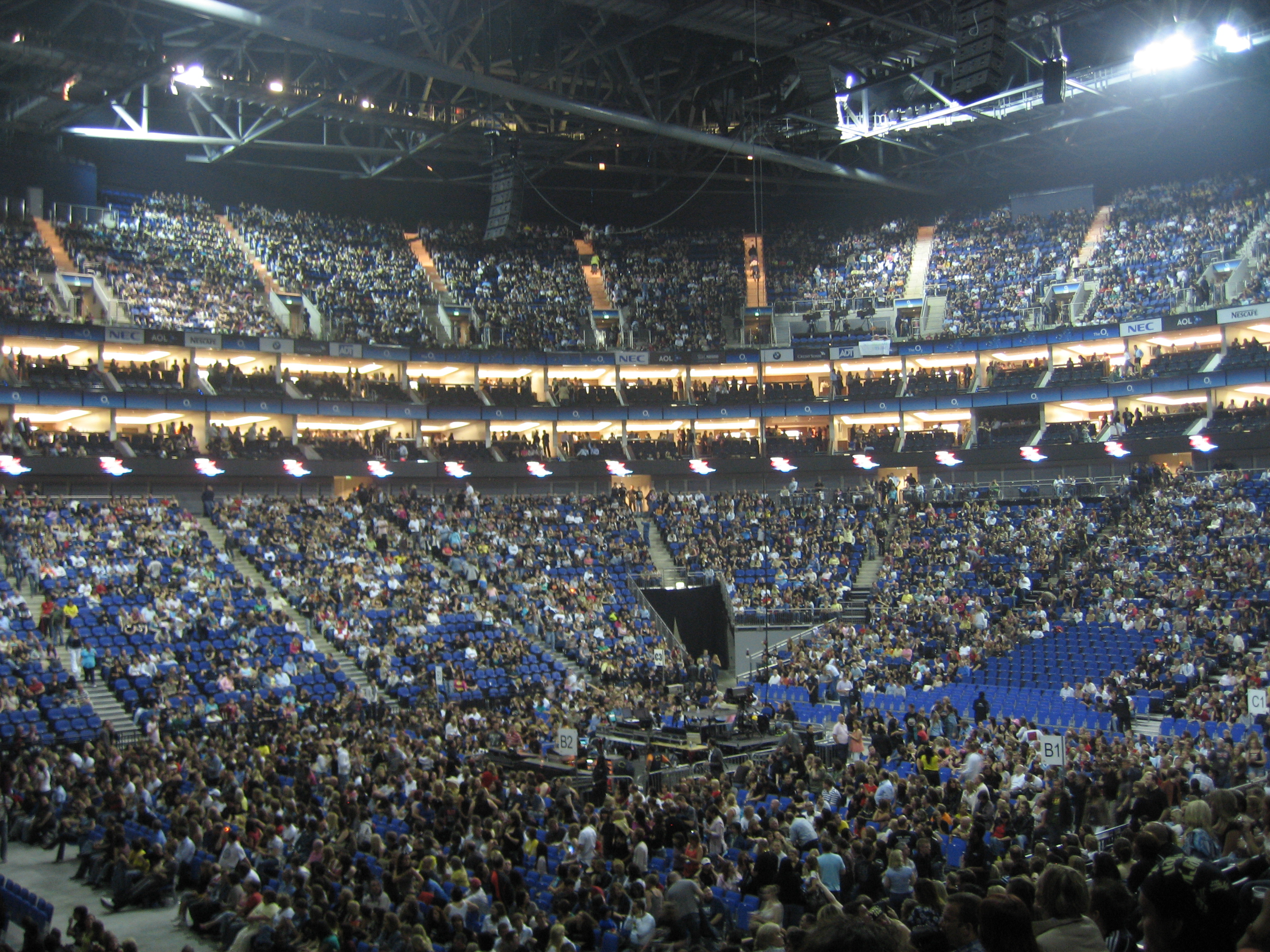
Inside the O2 Arena

The O2 Arena (referred to as the North Greenwich Arena for the 2012 Summer Olympics and Paralympics) is a 20,000 capacity venue, primarily used for live music. It is located at the centre of The O2 and was the first new purpose-built music venue in London since the Royal Albert Hall in 1871. It is the third largest arena in the UK after Co-op Live and the Manchester Arena, but is the busiest music venue in the world.

The arena and its facilities are housed in an independent building within the dome structure. The arena has hosted multiple kinds of music and sporting events, and in 2008 exceeded ticket sales for both Madison Square Garden and the Manchester Arena.

=== Indigo at The O2 ===
Indigo at The O2 is a 2,750-capacity live music club for smaller music events, club events, after-shows, corporate events, and private events. It contains four bars: two on the main ground floor area in front of the stage, one in the VIP lounge called the Purple Lounge, and one in the stalls, called Bleachers. The Purple Lounge is not in direct view of the stage, but guests have access to "Kings Row", the best seats in the venue. Indigo at The O2 is managed by Ansco Music Club Limited (the business name of the Indigo part of AEG Live).

The venue hosted "An Audience with Bill Clinton" in 2007. Classic FM hosted several shows throughout 2008. The venue hosted the 'bootcamp' sessions for the reality TV show, The X Factor during the 2008, Series 5 season, and in 2010 was used for the debut of the snooker format, Power Snooker. In 2012 it was the venue for a performance by South Korean pop rock band CN Blue. The Indigo also hosted the 2020 BDO World Darts Championship.

=== The O2 Bubble ===
The O2 Bubble was a two-storey bubble-shaped exhibition space built to museum standards, which opened in November 2007. It was made from ETFE, the same material used for the Eden Project, and the bubble itself was reportedly based on the Eden Project. Tutankhamen and the Golden Age of the Pharaohs was the first exhibition in the Bubble and after that was Body Worlds. In October 2009, it was Michael Jackson: The Official Exhibition, a collection of Jackson's personal items from his estate and Neverland Ranch, costumes and props from his tours and videos.

In 2009, the third floor of the bubble became an exhibition called the British Music Experience, a sixty-year retrospective of British popular music. The space, no longer named The O2 Bubble, has hosted various exhibitions including Star Wars Identities, My Name is Prince, Elvis on Tour, and DC Exhibition: Dawn of Super Heroes, and ABBA: Super Troupers The Exhibition, which was terminated earlier than planned, in 2020, due to COVID-19.

=== The Avenue ===
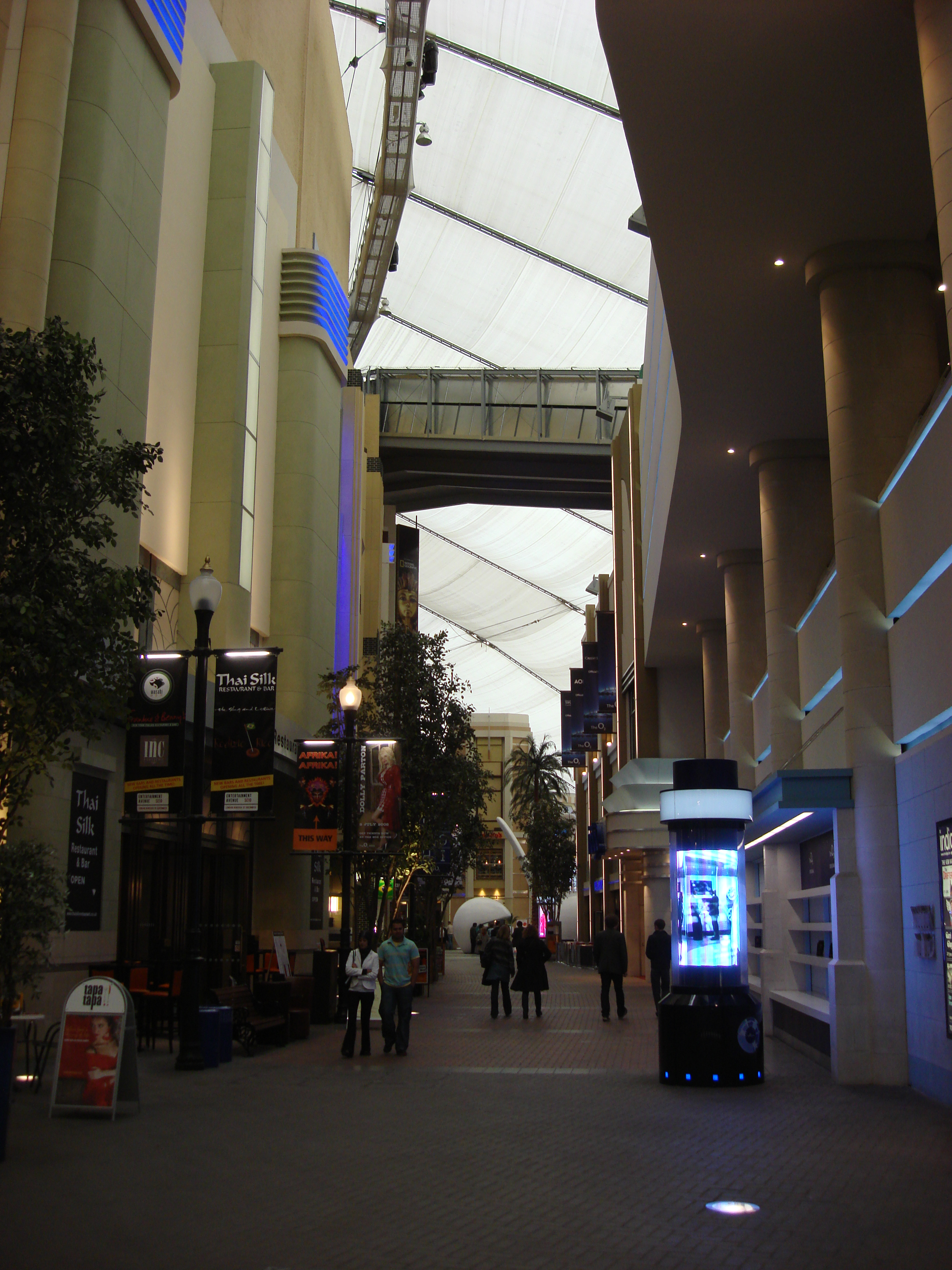
The Entertainment Avenue

The Entertainment Avenue is a wide pedestrian avenue within The O2, with artificial palm trees and other decorations, built around the circular arena building, which takes up the centre of the dome structure. The entertainment avenue has buildings on either side, which are leased to tenants who run bars and restaurants, and resembles a shopping centre.

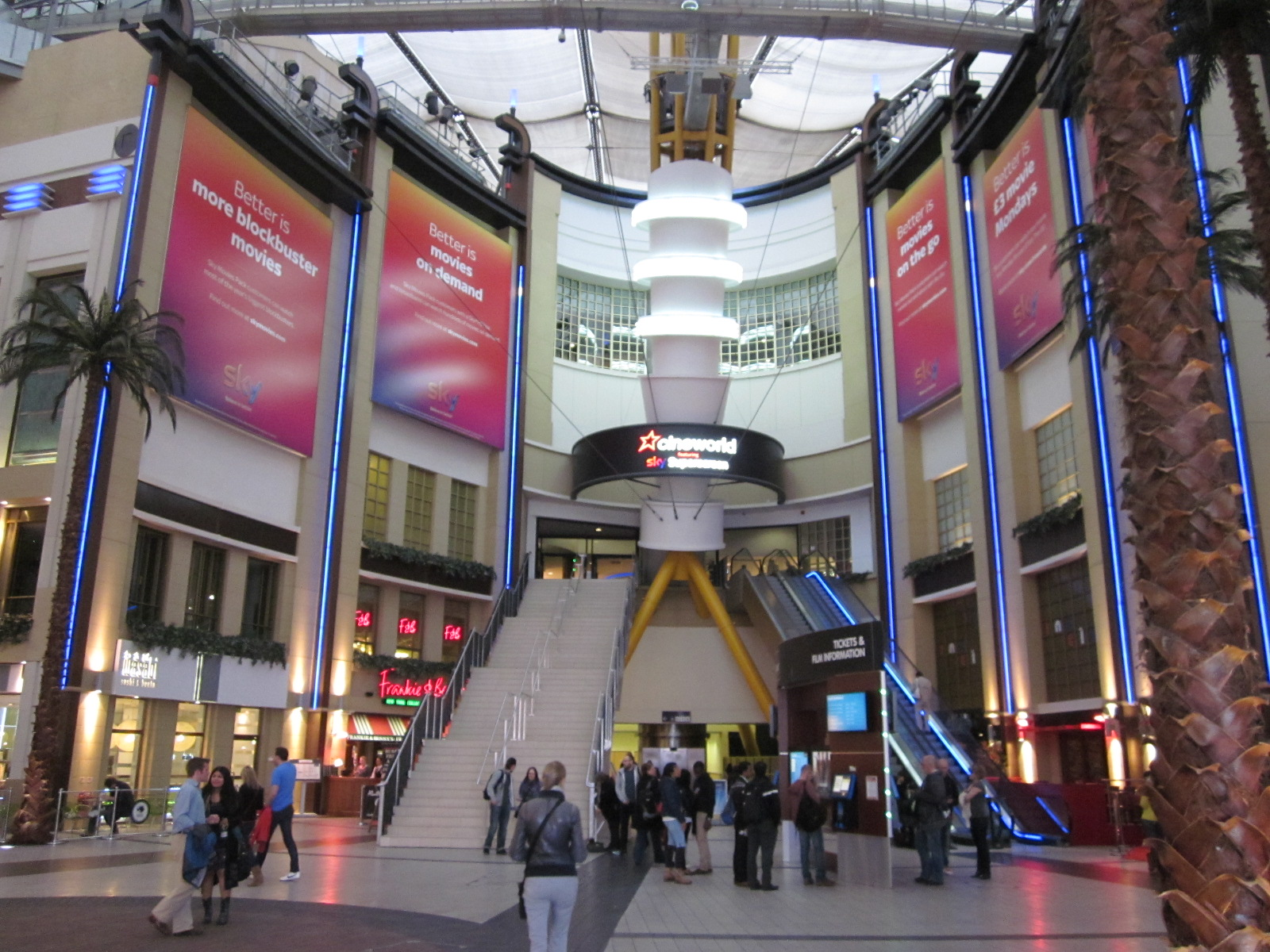
Entrance to Cineworld at the O2

The buildings on the Entertainment Avenue include a music club known as Indigo at The O2, an exhibition space, a cinema managed by Cineworld, and 26 bars and restaurants. The cinema includes 11 screens over 2 levels including one 770 capacity auditorium (Sky Super Screen) which is the third largest screen, by screen-size, in London, and the sixth largest screen in the UK. It uses the Vista ticketing system, in which tickets can be purchased from any refreshment stall. Cineworld began operating the cinema in 2010, taking over from Vue.

Fast food outlets had originally been banned from the development as the theme is 'aspirational but accessible', trying to avoid it being seen as a shopping centre but more like Covent Garden. This has since been relaxed with the opening of a KFC restaurant in February 2025.

=== Up at The O2 ===
Announced in 2011, Up at The O2 officially opened on 21 June 2012. It involves an expedition across the roof of The O2 along a 190m long tensile fabric walkway. Halfway, a central platform provides 360-degree views of the city, before a descent down to the base of the venue on the other side. From the platform, visitors can see the Olympic Park, Thames Barrier, Historic Royal Greenwich, Canary Wharf, and London City Airport. The climbing packages are separated depending on which time of day it currently is: Daylight, Sunset, and Twilight. They also offer drinks and meals at the summit.

=== Mamma Mia! the Party ===
In the summer of 2019, a new Mamma Mia! themed attraction opened at the O2. Mamma Mia! the Party was based on a popular Swedish show of the same name, which had enjoyed a successful run at the Tyrol Restaurant in Stockholm.

=== iFLY ===
In the spring of 2023, a new iFLY indoor skydiving attraction opened within The O2, which also offered people the opportunity to watch the indoor skydiving for free.

== Chronology of the site ==
- 1994: The Millennium Commission is established by prime minister John Major and handed over to deputy prime minister Michael Heseltine.
- January 1996: A site on the Greenwich Peninsula is selected. Birmingham, Derby and Stratford, London were also considered.
- May 1999: North Greenwich tube station opens as part of the Jubilee Line Extension, connecting the site to the rest of London by the Underground.
- 22 June 1999: The structure of the Dome is completed.
- 1 January 2000: The site opens to the public as the Millennium Experience, containing an exhibition to celebrate the third millennium.
- 31 December 2000: The Millennium Experience (and the Dome) closed to the public.
- 18 December 2001: Announcement of sale of the site to Meridian Delta, who plan to turn it into a 20,000-seat sports and entertainment venue. Houses and offices will be built on the surrounding land, subject to the consent of the London Borough of Greenwich.
- 31 May 2005: Anschutz Entertainment Group sells the naming rights to the former Millennium Dome to O2 plc, a British mobile phone company.
- 23 June 2007: The 'O2 premiere' private event opens to staff. Peter Kay, Tom Jones, Kaiser Chiefs and Basement Jaxx perform.
- 24 June 2007: The O2 opens to the public. Bon Jovi is the first band to play the new The O2 Arena.
- 2 September 2007: Disney Channel's High School Musical 2 premieres at The O2; it is the first movie to premiere at the venue.
- 6 April 2008: The Olympic torch relay passes The O2.
- 13 July 2009 – 6 March 2010: On 13 July 2009, Michael Jackson was scheduled to hold a 50-show residency at the arena, titled This Is It. However, the concerts were cancelled following Jackson's death on 25 June 2009. Less than 3 weeks before the first "This Is It" show was due to begin in London.
- 7 June 2010: Bon Jovi become the first band to play on the roof of The O2 to commemorate the beginning of their 12-night residency in the arena.
- 21 June 2012: Up at The O2 officially opened.
- 20 October 2018: The Icon Outlet shopping centre opens at The O2.
- 18 February 2022: The O2's fabric roof sustained severe damage from exposure to wind speeds of at least 100 mph (160 km/h) during Storm Eunice, which tore open several sections of the roof.

== Transport links ==
Public transport access
| London Buses | North Greenwich bus station: 108, 129, 132, 161, 188, 335, 422, 472, 486 |
| London Underground | North Greenwich |
| London Cable Car | London Cable Car |
| River Bus | Thames Clippers RB1 / RB2 |

== See also ==
- Tensile structure
