= London Buses route 129 =

London bus route

129
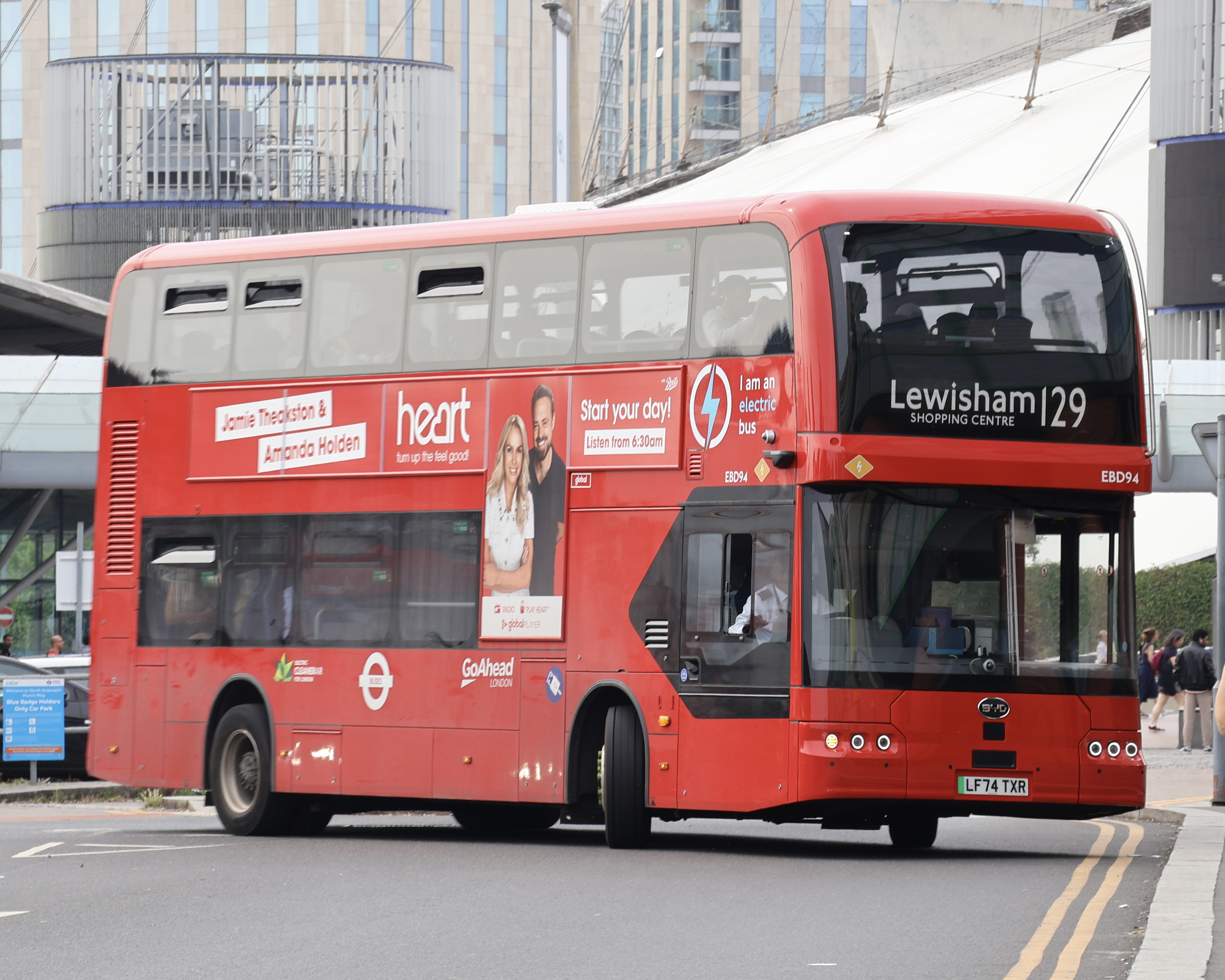
- Blue Triangle BYD BD11B on the Greenwich Peninsula in June 2025

Overview
- Operator: Blue Triangle (Go-Ahead London)
- Garage: Henley Road
- Vehicle: BYD BD11B
- Peak vehicle requirement: 22
- Began service: 3 June 2006
- Former operators: Travel London; Abellio London; London Central
- Night-time: No night service

Route
- Start: Lewisham Shopping Centre
- Via: Greenwich; Greenwich Peninsula; Silvertown; London City Airport; Beckton
- End: Gallions Reach
- Length: 10 miles (16 km)

Service
- Level: Daily
- Frequency: Every 8-12 minutes
- Journey time: 54-80 minutes
- Operates: 05:20 until 01:20

London Buses route 129 is a Transport for London contracted bus route in London, England. Running between Lewisham Shopping Centre and Gallions Reach, it is operated by Go-Ahead London subsidiary Blue Triangle.

The route is one of three bus routes to run through the Silvertown Tunnel, alongside route SL4 and the Silvertown Tunnel cycle shuttle.

== History ==
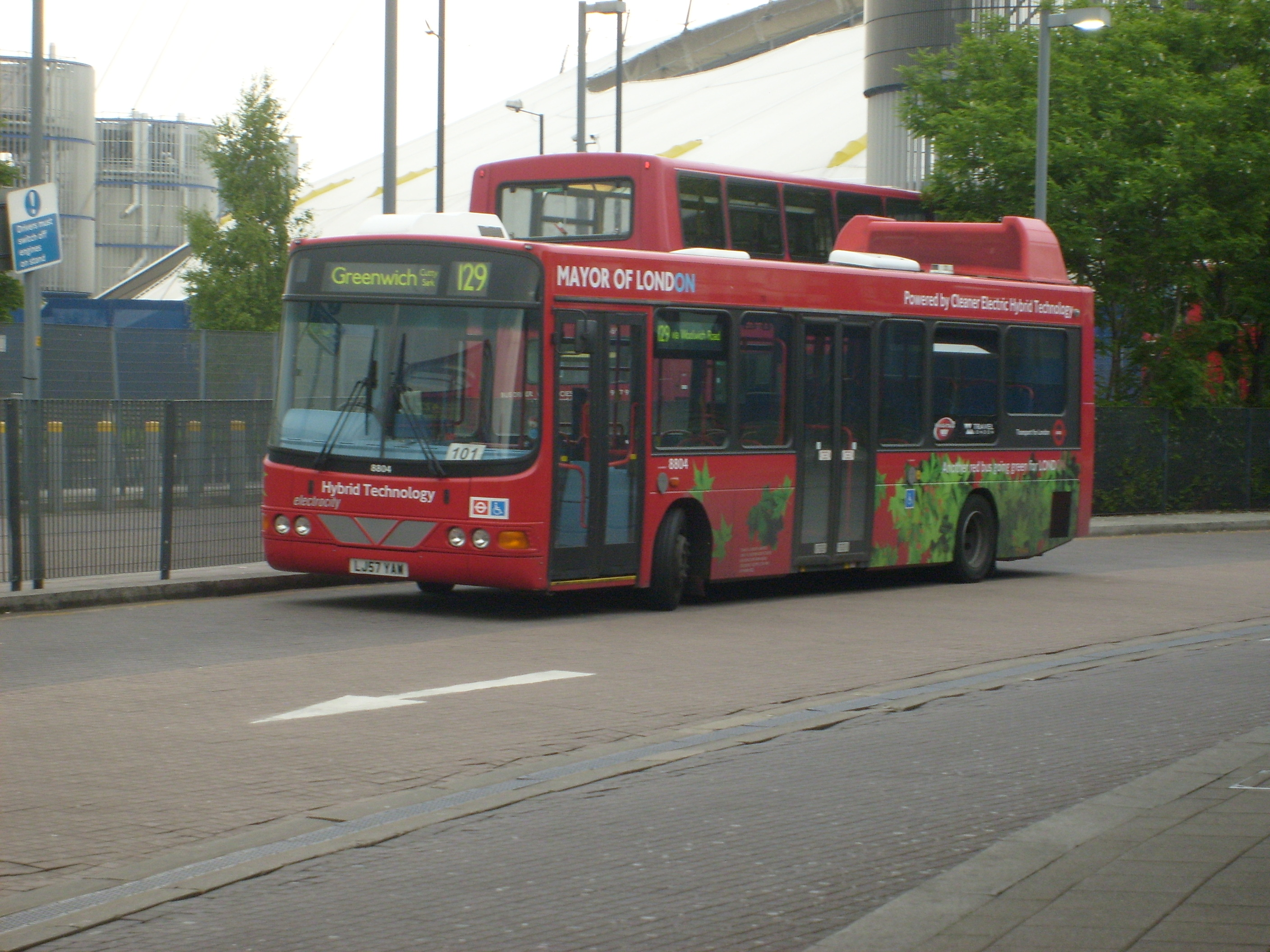
Travel London Wright Electrocity at North Greenwich bus station

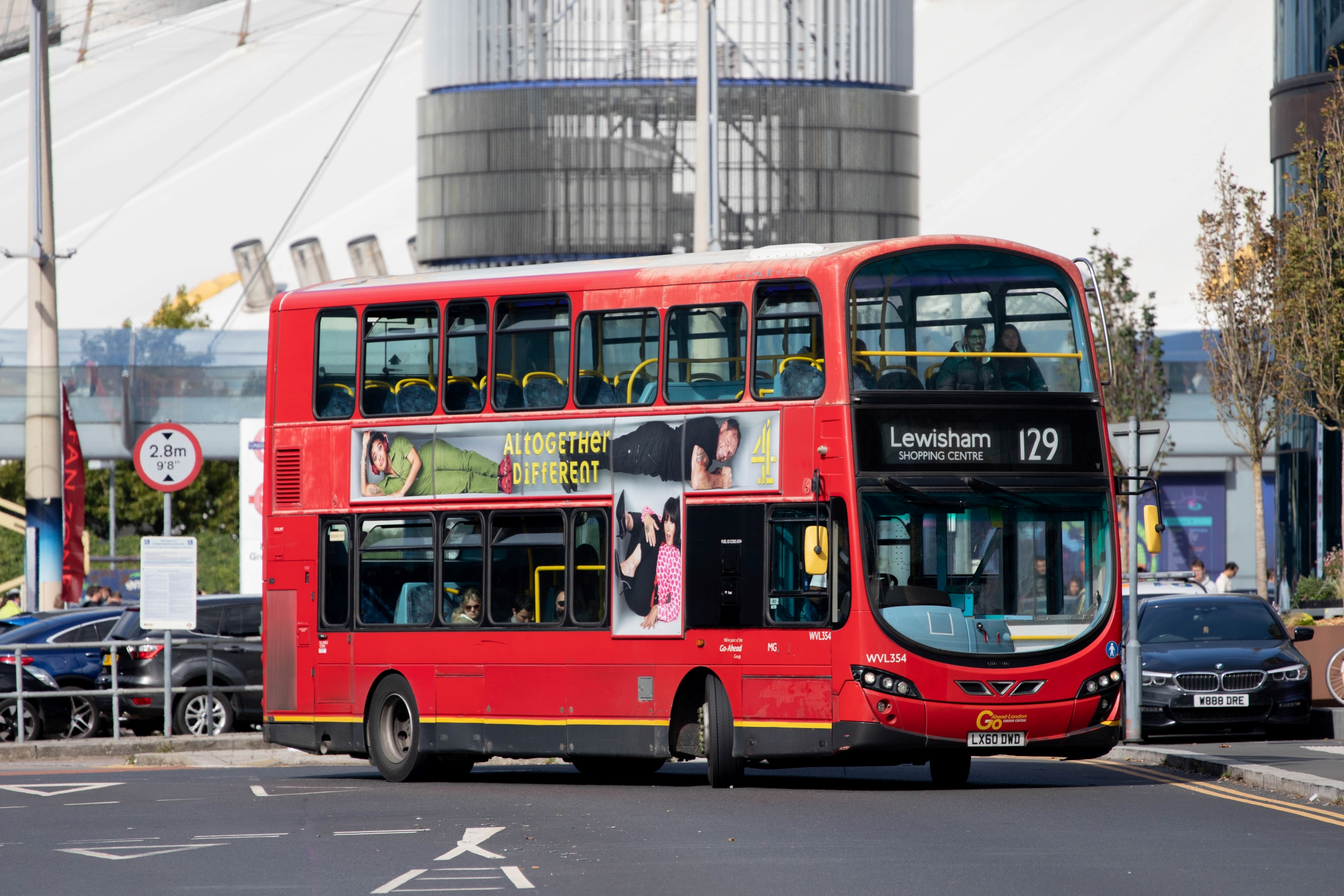
London Central Volvo B9TL Wright Eclipse Gemini 2 on the Greenwich Peninsula

Following a public consultation, route 129 was introduced on 3 June 2006 to provide a direct connection between Greenwich Millennium Village and Greenwich. The route originally ran between Greenwich and North Greenwich bus station and was operated by Travel London using single decker buses.

Route 129 was included in the sale of Travel London to Abellio London in May 2009.

On 4 June 2011, the contract for the route passed from Abellio London to Go-Ahead London subsidiary London Central, continuing to use single decker buses.

In June 2014, the route was fully converted to use double decker buses.

In July 2017, Transport for London opened a public consultation proposing for the route to be extended from Greenwich to Lewisham Shopping Centre in order to support the opening of the Elizabeth line. This change was implemented on 14 May 2022, partially replacing route 180.

In November 2022, Transport for London opened a public consultation proposing for the route to be extended from North Greenwich bus station to Gallions Reach via Silvertown, London City Airport and Beckton as part of the Silvertown Tunnel bus network. In March 2023, it was confirmed that the extension would go ahead and it was implemented on 7 April 2025, the same day as the opening of the Silvertown Tunnel. On the same day, the contract for the route was transferred within Go-Ahead London from London Central to Blue Triangle.

== Current route ==
Route 129 operates via these primary locations:

- Lewisham Shopping Centre
- Lewisham station
- Greenwich station
- Greenwich Cutty Sark
- Maze Hill
- Greenwich Millennium Village
- North Greenwich bus station for North Greenwich station
- West Silvertown station
- Pontoon Dock station
- London City Airport
- Beckton bus station for Beckton station
- Gallions Reach station
- Gallions Reach Great Eastern Quay

== Operation ==
The route operates at a frequency of a bus every eight minutes on weekdays, every 10 minutes on Saturdays and every 12 minutes during the evenings and on Sundays.

Like all bus services using the Silvertown Tunnel, the service is operated using zero emission battery electric buses. Originally, the service was to be free to use for all passengers until at least April 2026. In February 2026, this was extended by a further seven weeks with free travel applying until the end of 26 May 2026.

== Previous route 129 ==
The route number 129 was previously used for a service running between Claybury Broadway and Becontree Heath. This service was withdrawn on 26 June 2004, being replaced by sections of routes 128 and 150.
