= Emirates Air Line =

Emirates Air Line may refer to:

- Emirates (airline), a state-owned airline based in Dubai
- London Cable Car, a cable car link over the Thames River formerly named the Emirates Air Line
