= London Buses route 108 =

London bus route

108
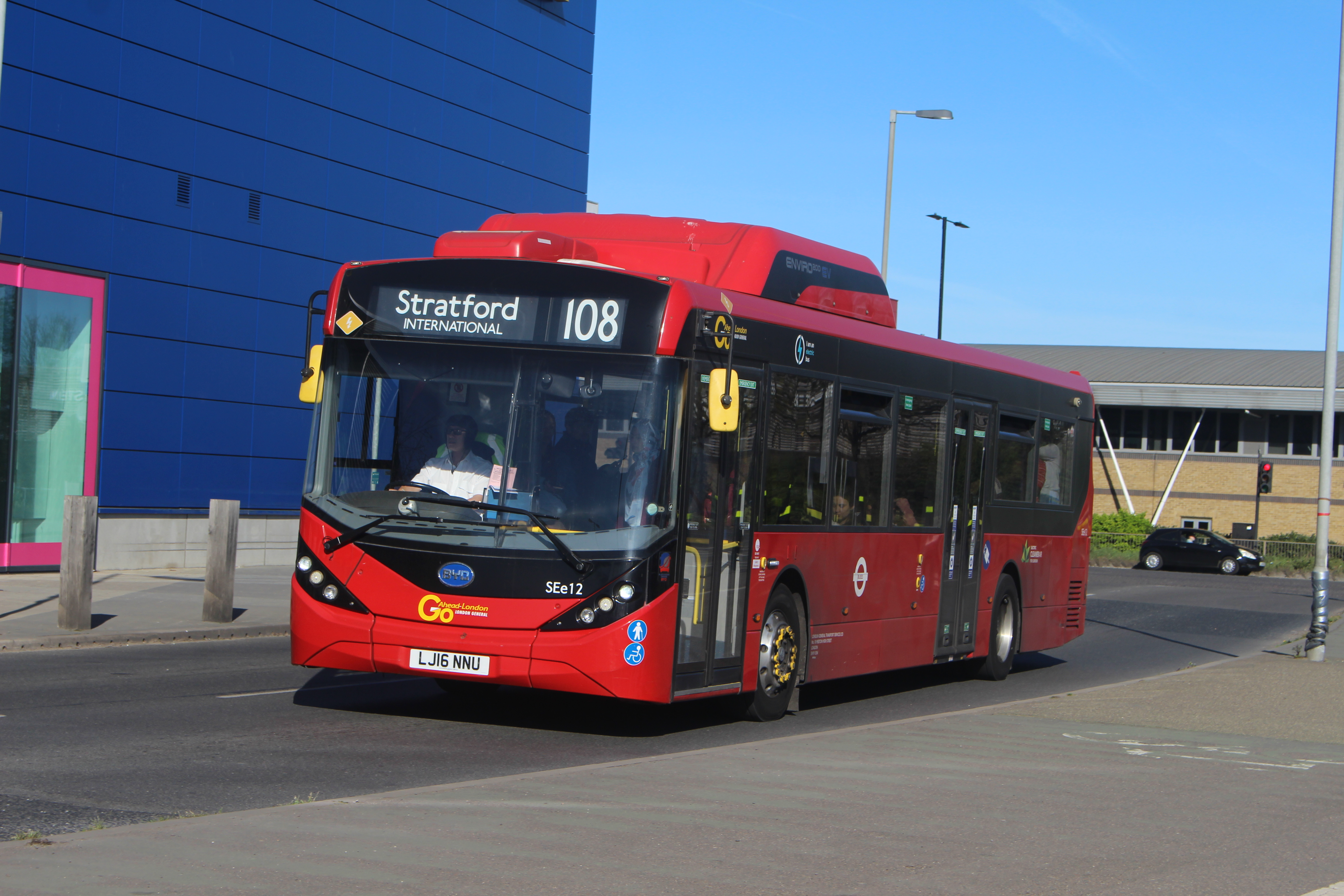
- London Central BYD Alexander Dennis Enviro200EV on the Greenwich Peninsula in April 2025

Overview
- Operator: London Central (Go-Ahead London)
- Garage: New Cross; Camberwell (night-only double decker journeys)
- Vehicle: BYD Alexander Dennis Enviro200EV; BYD Alexander Dennis Enviro400EV (night-only double-decker journeys)
- Peak vehicle requirement: Day: 19; Night: 6
- Night-time: 24-hour service

Route
- Start: Lewisham Shopping Centre
- Via: Blackheath; Westcombe Park; Greenwich Peninsula; Poplar; Bow
- End: Stratford International station North Greenwich bus station (night-only double-decker journeys)
- Length: 11 miles (18 km)

Service
- Level: 24-hour service
- Frequency: About every 10-15 minutes
- Journey time: 40-55 minutes
- Operates: 24-hour service

London Buses route 108 is a Transport for London contracted bus route in London, England. Running between Lewisham Shopping Centre and Stratford International station, it is operated by Go-Ahead London subsidiary London Central.

An unusual feature of the route is its use of the Blackwall Tunnel, a source of severe delays which leads to the route often being cited as amongst the least reliable in London.

== History ==
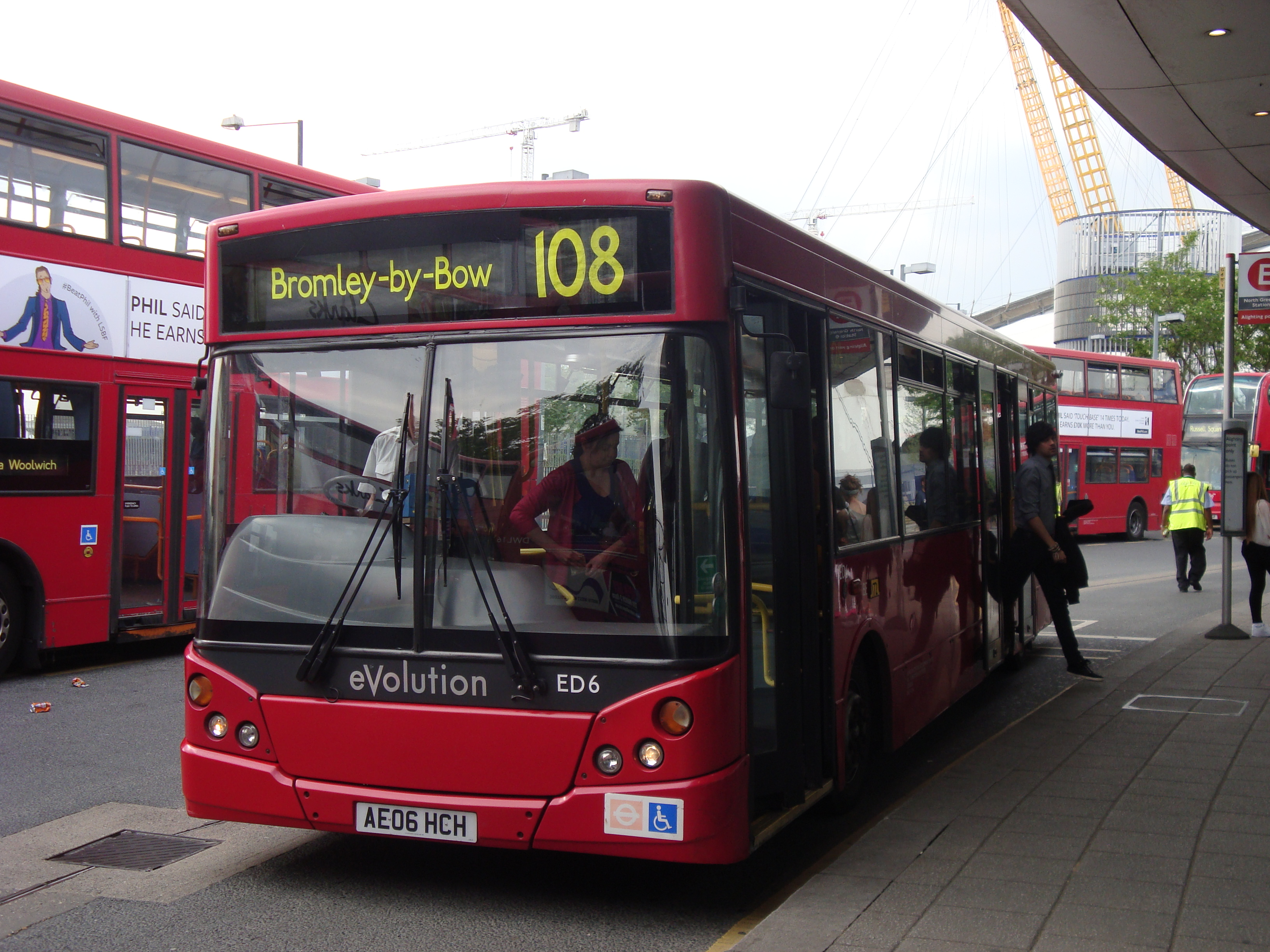
London Central MCV Evolution bodied Alexander Dennis Dart SLF at North Greenwich bus station in 2014

Two batches of double deck buses were specifically built for use in the Blackwall and Rotherhithe Tunnels, with specially shaped roofs to improve clearance on the corners. On 14 April 1937, the last solid-tyred AEC NS-Type bus in London operated on route 108. In 1937, forty STL-type buses with convex-shaped roofs made with Blackwall Tunnel in mind were used on routes 108 and 82 and allocated to Athol Street (C) garage in Poplar.

Harris Bus ran into financial difficulties in December 1999, and as a result operations of its contracted routes were taken over by a new subsidiary of London Buses itself, trading as East Thames Buses. East Thames Buses initially ran its routes north of the Thames from the former London Forest garage in Ash Grove, along with the Harris base at Belvedere.

Route 108 became the first bus route to serve the Millennium Dome at the Greenwich Peninsula during construction. The stop was initially inside the security area, and was used by staff only.

On 3 October 2009, East Thames Buses was sold to London General, which included a five-year contract to operate route 108. Increased capacity was introduced on route 108 in 2014.

In February 2016, Transport for London released a consultation regarding various changes on local bus services in Poplar and the Isle of Dogs. One of these changes saw route 108 swap routes between All Saints and Bow with route D8 and extended to terminate at Stratford International station in lieu of Stratford bus station from 1 October 2016 with it no longer serving Bromley-by-Bow and Poplar. Mercedes-Benz O530 Citaros and two electric Irizar i2es cascaded from routes 507 and 521 were introduced at the same time.

== Current route ==
Route 108 operates via these primary locations:

- Lewisham Shopping Centre
- Blackheath station
- Blackheath Royal Standard
- Westcombe Park station
- Greenwich Millennium Village
- North Greenwich bus station for North Greenwich station
- Poplar
- Langdon Park station
- Devons Road station
- Bow Church station
- London Aquatics Centre
- Stratford City bus station for Stratford station
- Stratford International station
