= London Buses route 132 =

London bus route

132
- London Central BYD Alexander Dennis Enviro400EV in Avery Hill in July 2026

Overview
- Operator: London Central (Go-Ahead London)
- Garage: Bexleyheath
- Vehicle: BYD Alexander Dennis Enviro400EV
- Night-time: Night Bus N21

Route
- Start: Bexleyheath town centre
- Via: Bexley; Blendon; Blackfen; Avery Hill; Eltham; Kidbrooke
- End: North Greenwich bus station
- Length: 10 miles (16 km)

Service
- Level: Daily
- Frequency: Every 10-15 minutes
- Journey time: 35-74 minutes
- Operates: 04:25 until 01:58

London Buses route 132 is a Transport for London contracted bus route in London, England. Running between Bexleyheath town centre and North Greenwich bus station, it is operated by Go-Ahead London subsidiary London Central.

== History ==
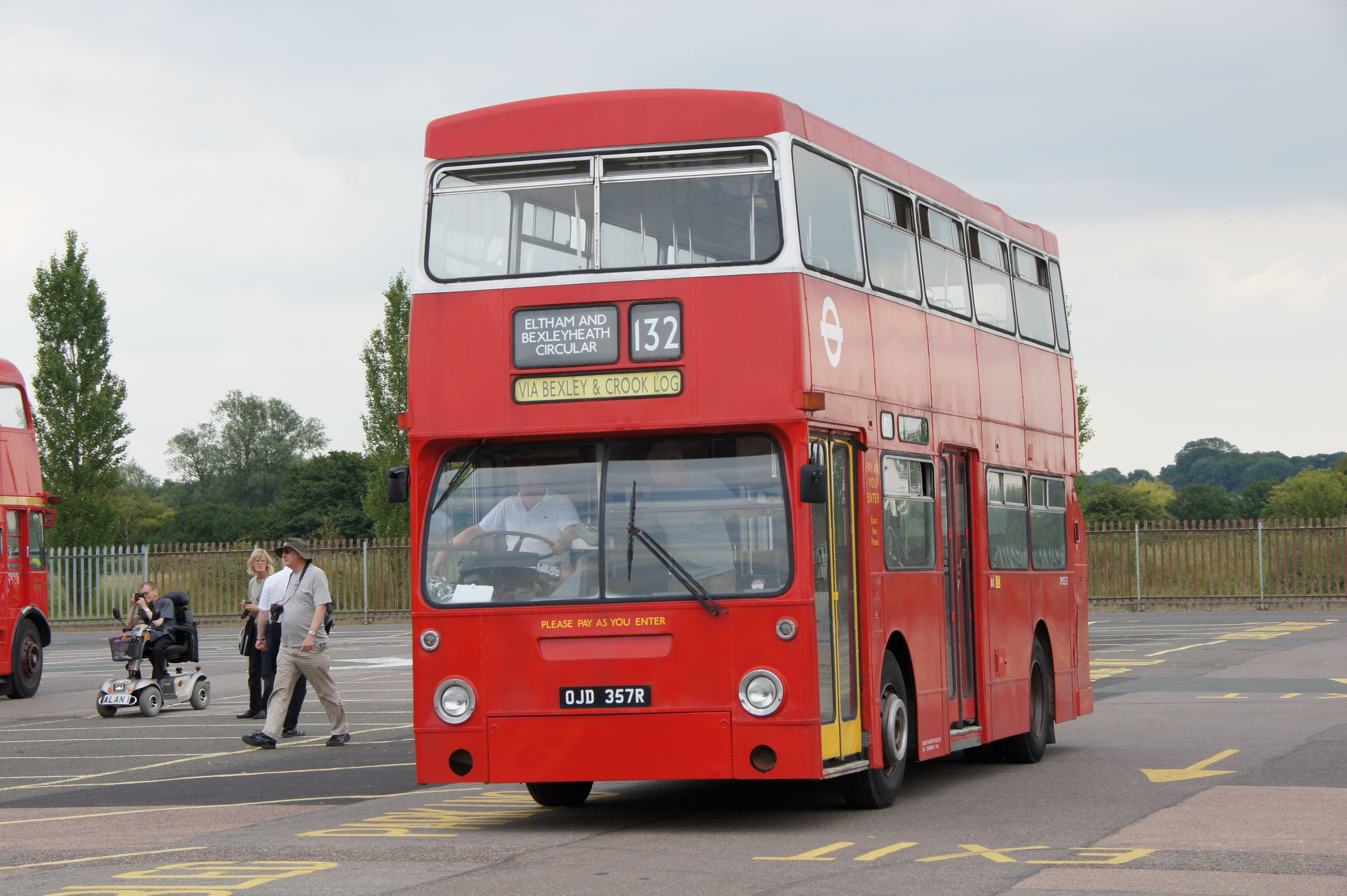
Preserved London Transport Daimler Fleetline in July 2011

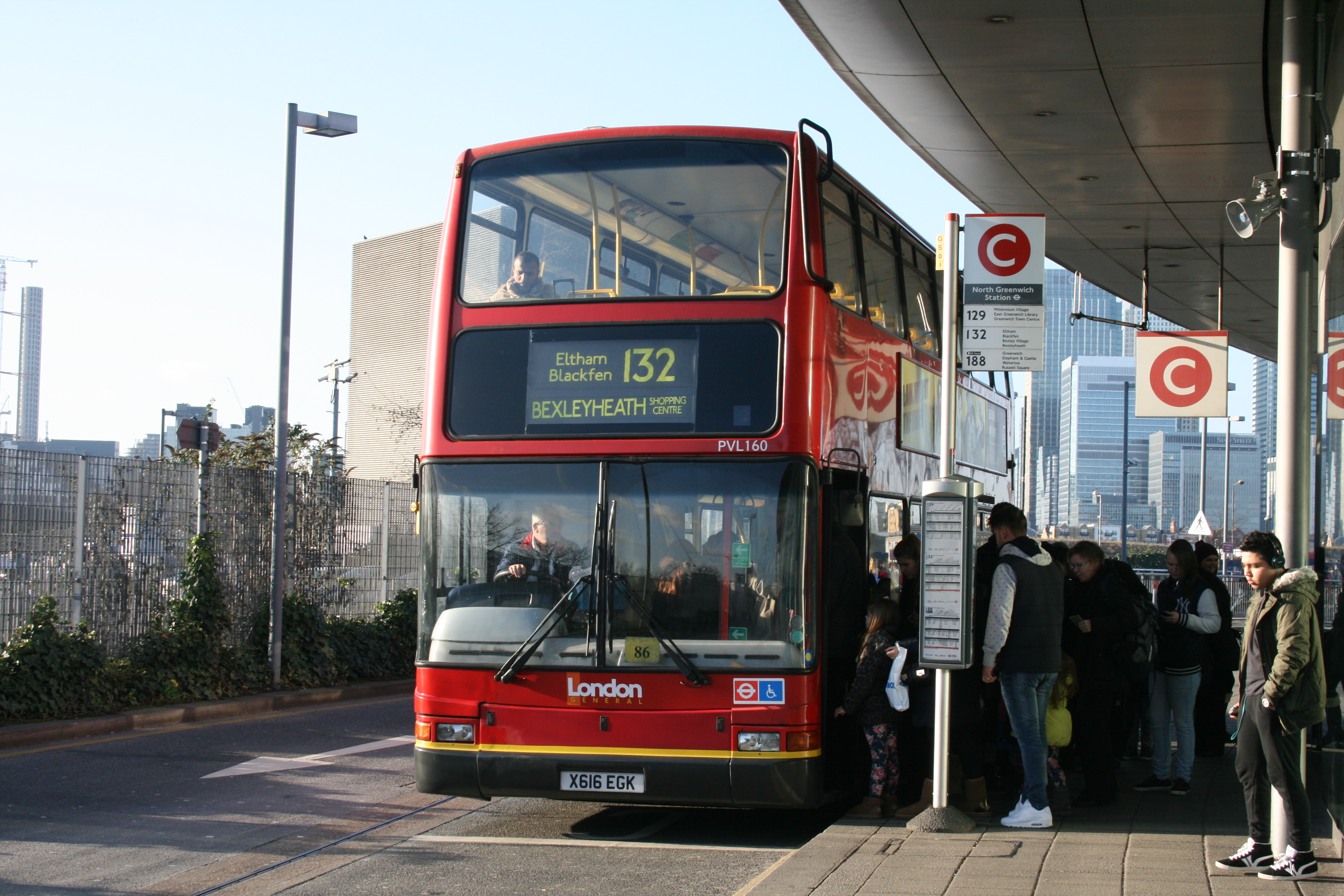
London General Plaxton President bodied Volvo B7TL at North Greenwich bus station in December 2014

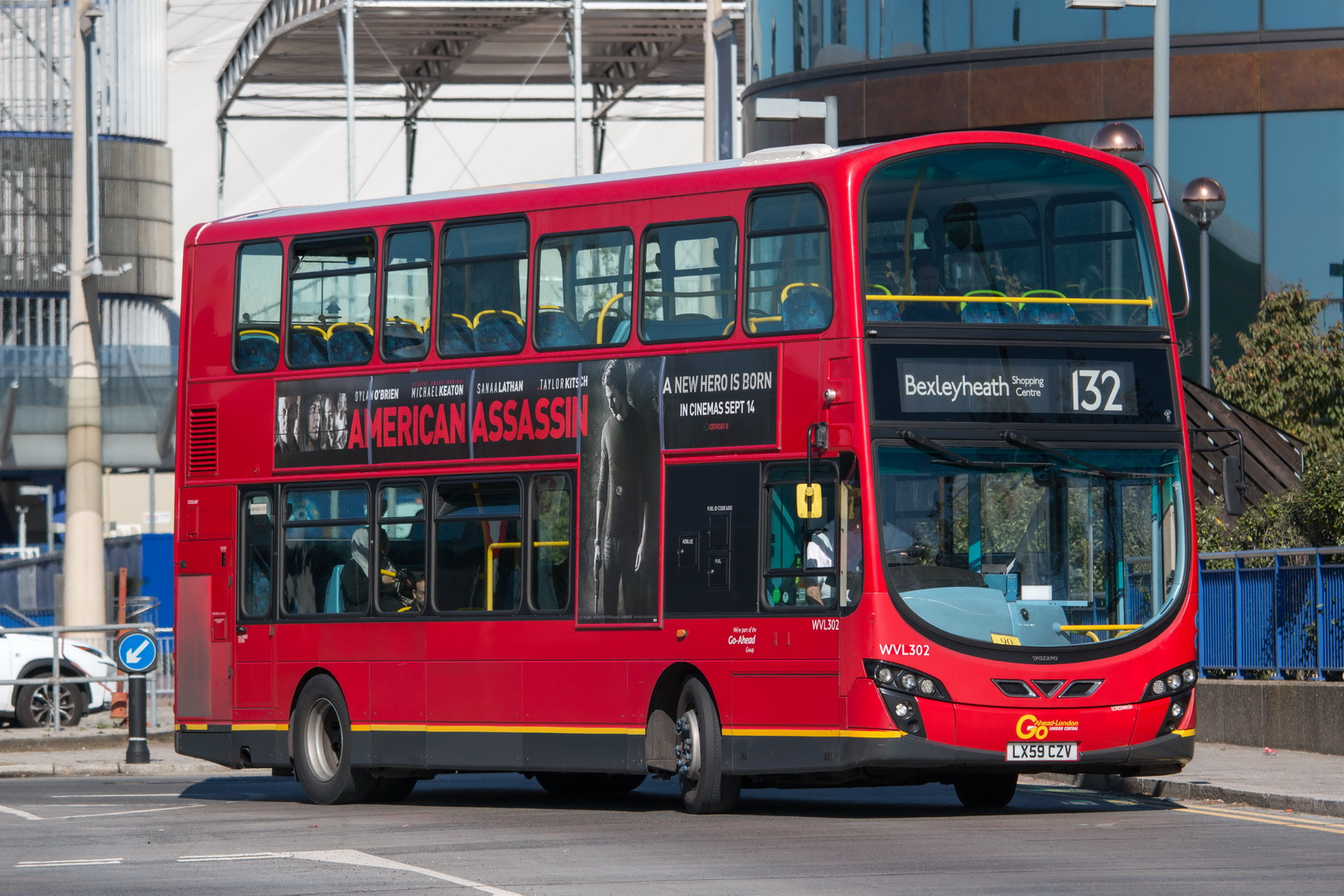
London Central Wright Eclipse Gemini 2 bodied Volvo B9TL in September 2017

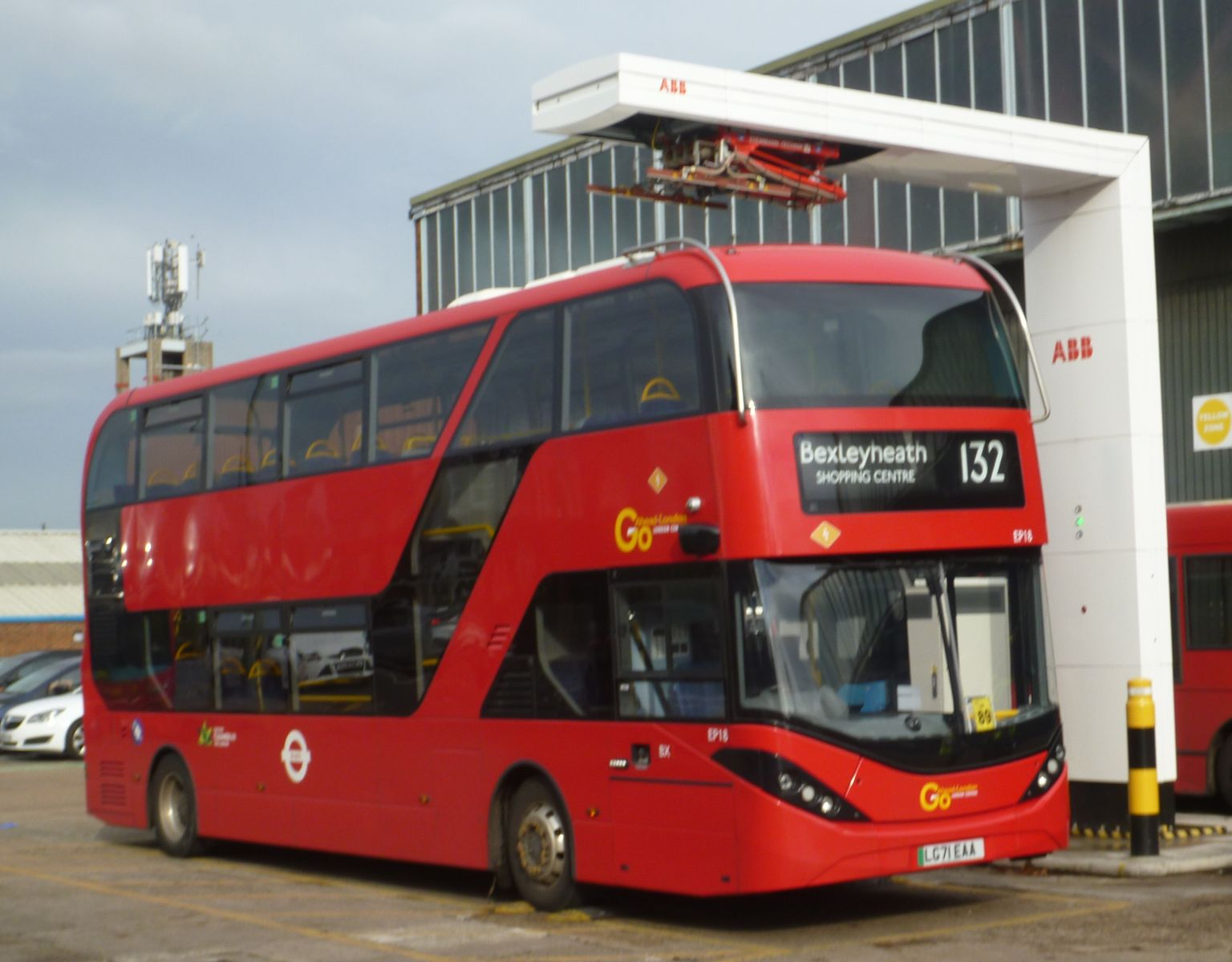
BYD Alexander Dennis Enviro400EV parked beneath the pantograph but not charging

On 24 January 2009, the route was extended westwards via the Greenwich Peninsula to North Greenwich bus station. On 3 October 2009, East Thames Buses was sold to Go-Ahead London, which included a five-year contract to operate route 132. On 7 November 2009, the allocation was transferred to Bexleyheath garage.

Since October 2009, part of the route from Eltham to Bexleyheath has been covered at night by night bus route N21.

During the London 2012 Olympics, the route was temporarily converted from single-decker to double-decker operation. The route was permanently converted to double-decker operation in December 2012.

On 12 September 2015, the route gained a 24-hour service on Friday and Saturday nights. At the moment, the 24-hour service on Friday and Saturday nights is suspended due to the COVID-19 pandemic.

In January 2020, the daytime frequency of the route was increased from a bus every 10 minutes to a bus every eight minutes.

In November 2020, Transport for London announced that the route would be operated by electric double-decker buses. On 9 July 2022, the route began converting to electric bus operation with BYD Alexander Dennis Enviro400EV vehicles. To cater for these vehicles, a pantograph charger was installed at Bexleyheath bus garage to allow rapid charging to 'top up' the battery during the day.

== Current route ==
Route 132 operates via these primary locations:

- Bexleyheath town centre
- Bexley station
- Blendon
- Blackfen
- Avery Hill
- Eltham High Street
- Eltham station
- Kidbrooke
- Greenwich Millennium Village
- North Greenwich bus station for North Greenwich station
