= London Buses route 180 =

London bus route

180
- Selkent Alexander Dennis Enviro400 MMC on the Greenwich Peninsula in April 2026

Overview
- Operator: Selkent (Stagecoach London)
- Garage: Plumstead
- Vehicle: Alexander Dennis Enviro400H MMC; BYD Alexander Dennis Enviro400EV
- Peak vehicle requirement: 17
- Began service: 7 October 1951
- Former operators: London Central; London General; East Thames Buses; Harris Bus; London Regional Transport; London Transport Executive (GLC); London Transport Executive

Route
- Start: Erith Quarry
- Via: Belvedere; Abbey Wood; Plumstead; Woolwich; Charlton
- End: North Greenwich bus station
- Length: 11 miles (18 km)

Service
- Level: Daily
- Frequency: Every 10-15 minutes
- Journey time: 41-73 minutes
- Operates: 04:30 until 01:55

London Buses route 180 is a Transport for London contracted bus route in London, England. Running between Erith Quarry and North Greenwich bus station, it is operated by Stagecoach London subsidiary Selkent.

== History ==
In June 1992, a South Yorkshire Passenger Transport Executive Leyland-DAB articulated bus was trialled for a month on the route along with a three-axle Citybus Leyland Olympian. On 14 February 1998, operation of the route passed from Selkent to Harris Bus. After Harris Bus ran into financial difficulty, on 25 March 2000 it was taken over by East Thames Buses.

On 3 October 2009, East Thames Buses was sold to London General, which included a five-year contract to operate route 180. London General retained the route when re-tendered with a new contract commencing on 1 October 2016. In December 2017, it was transferred from Belvedere garage to Morden Wharf garage.

On 2 October 2021, the route was taken over by Stagecoach London.

In July 2017 Transport for London announced proposed changes to route 180 in anticipation of the opening of the Elizabeth line with route 180 to be diverted after Charlton to run to North Greenwich instead of Lewisham. The change was implemented on 14 May 2022.

== Current route ==
Route 180 operates via these primary locations:

- Erith Quarry
- Erith town centre
- Belvedere
- Abbey Wood station
- Plumstead station
- Woolwich station
- Woolwich Arsenal station
- Charlton station
- Greenwich Millennium Village
- North Greenwich bus station for North Greenwich station

== Vehicles ==
Since November 2021, the route has been partially operated by BYD Alexander Dennis Enviro400EVs.
