= London cable car =

Cable car link across the River Thames in London

London Cable Car

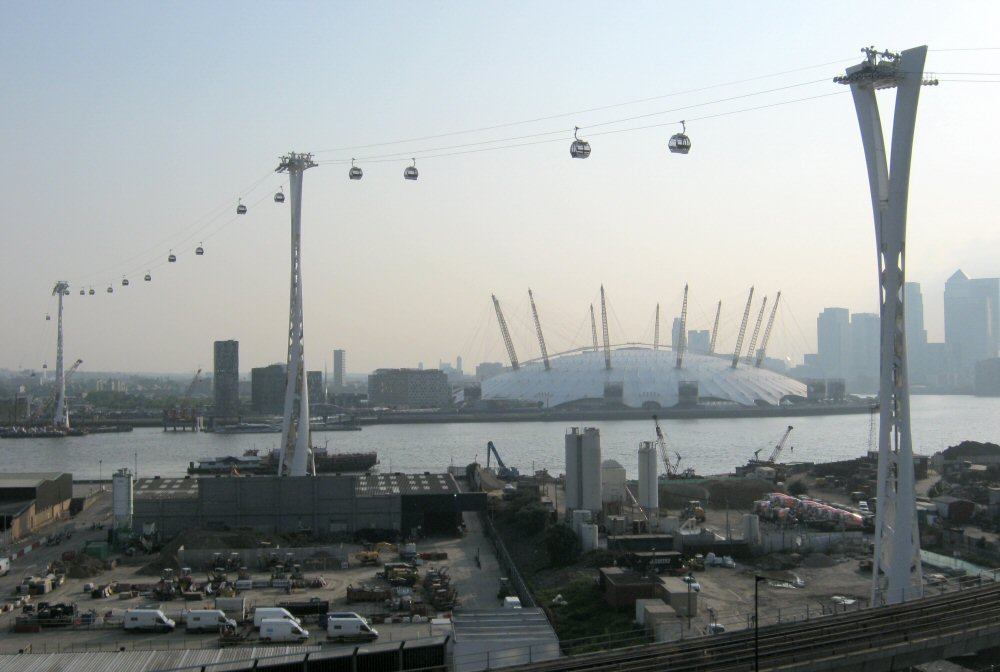
- The three pylons, seen from north of the River Thames

Overview
- Status: Open
- Owner: Transport for London
- Locale: Greenwich/Docklands, London, England
- Coordinates: 51°30′13″N 00°00′47″E
- Termini: Greenwich Peninsula (west); Royal Docks (east)
- Website: tfl.gov.uk/modes/london-cable-car/

Service
- Type: Gondola lift
- Operator: First London Cableway
- Ridership: 1,474,546 (in 2023)

History
- Opened: 28 June 2012; 14 years ago

Technical
- Line length: 1,100 m (3,600 ft)
- Character: Elevated
- Electrification: Electric motor powering cable bullwheel Auxiliary diesel engine powering cable
- Operating speed: 14 mph (23 km/h)
- Highest elevation: 90 m (300 ft)

The London cable car, also known as the Dangleway, is a cable car link across the River Thames in London, England. The line was built by Doppelmayr and the total cost was around £60 million.

The service opened on 28 June 2012. It is owned by Transport for London (TfL) and currently operated by FirstGroup. From 20 October 2022 until 18 March 2026, it had been sponsored by the technology firm IFS and known as the IFS Cloud Cable Car; prior to this, from its opening the line was sponsored by the airline Emirates, and known as the Emirates Air Line until 28 June 2022.

The service comprises a 0.62-mile (1.00 km) gondola line that crosses the Thames from the Greenwich Peninsula to the Royal Victoria Dock, to the west of ExCeL London. In addition to transport across the river, the service advertises "a unique view of London". On 28 June 2024, FirstGroup took over the operations of the cable car line.

== History ==
=== Proposed Meridian Skyway ===
The idea for a cable car linking the Greenwich Peninsula with the north bank of the Thames first emerged during the development of the "car free" transport strategy for the Millennium Dome (now The O2) in the late 1990s. Presented to planning authorities in early 1997 by Meridian Cable Cars, this link would have run from the Dome site to the DLR's East India station in Tower Hamlets.

The estimated cost of the cable car was £8–10 million, for 23 gondolas, each with seating for nine and standing room for a further six, that would have travelled at 5 mph (8.0 km/h) at between 50 and 80 m (160 and 260 ft) in the air. Taking three minutes to make a one-way trip, it would have had a capacity of 2,500 passengers per hour each way. Full planning permission was granted in December 1997 and July 1998 for the northern and southern sides respectively, the northern side permission being one of the last acts of the London Docklands Development Corporation. An opening date of October 1999 was planned, but because of negative reactions from the administrators of the Dome project, financial backers pulled out and the cable car project collapsed in October 1998.

=== Proposed London Cable Car ===
On 4 July 2010, Transport for London (TfL) announced plans to develop a cable car crossing over the River Thames, which would be the first urban cable car in the United Kingdom. Designed by Wilkinson Eyre Architects, Expedition Engineering and Buro Happold, it would cross the river at a height up to 90 m (300 ft), higher than The O2, which is nearby. The cable car would provide a crossing every 15 seconds, with a maximum capacity of 2,500 passengers per hour in each direction, about 50 busloads. Bicycles could be carried, and passengers would be able to pay for their journeys with pay-as-you-go Oyster cards.

A planning application was submitted to the London Borough of Newham, using the name London Cable Car, in October 2010 for the "erection of a cable car for the length of 1,100 m (3,600 ft) over the River Thames from North Greenwich Peninsula to Royal Victoria Dock at a minimum clearance of 54.1 m (177 ft) above mean high water springs". The application listed the structures planned for the service on the north side of the Thames as a 87 m (285 ft) north main tower at Clyde Wharf, a 66 m (217 ft) north intermediate tower south of the Docklands Light Railway tracks roughly midway between Canning Town and West Silvertown stations, a two-storey gondola station and "boat impact protection" in Royal Victoria Dock. South of the river there is a 60 m (200 ft) main support tower and a boarding station within the car park of the O2.

When the project was announced, TfL's initial budget was £25 million; they announced this would be entirely funded by private finance. This figure was first revised to £45 million, and by September 2011 had more than doubled to £60 million, reportedly because TfL had not included the costs of legal advice, project management, land acquisition and other costs. TfL planned to make up the shortfall by paying for the project out of the London Rail budget, applying for funding from the European Regional Development Fund (ERDF) and seeking commercial sponsorship. €9.7 million of ERDF support, out of an estimated €65.56 million total budget, was agreed on 9 July 2012.

In January 2011, News International was planning to sponsor the project, but withdrew its offer. In October 2011 it was announced that the Dubai-based airline Emirates would provide £36 million in a ten-year sponsorship deal which included branding of the cable car service with the airline's name.

=== Construction ===
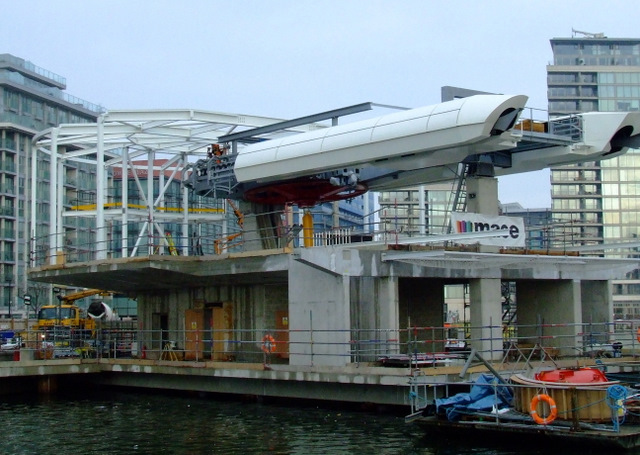
The north-eastern terminal under construction beside Royal Victoria Dock, 2012

Construction began in August 2011 with Mace as the lead contractor. Doppelmayr built the cable car for £45 million and Mace was to operate it for the first three years for a further £5.5 million. TfL stated that the initial construction funding and Emirates sponsorship would cover £36 million of the cost, with the rest to be funded from fares. In 2011, it was the most expensive cable car system ever built.

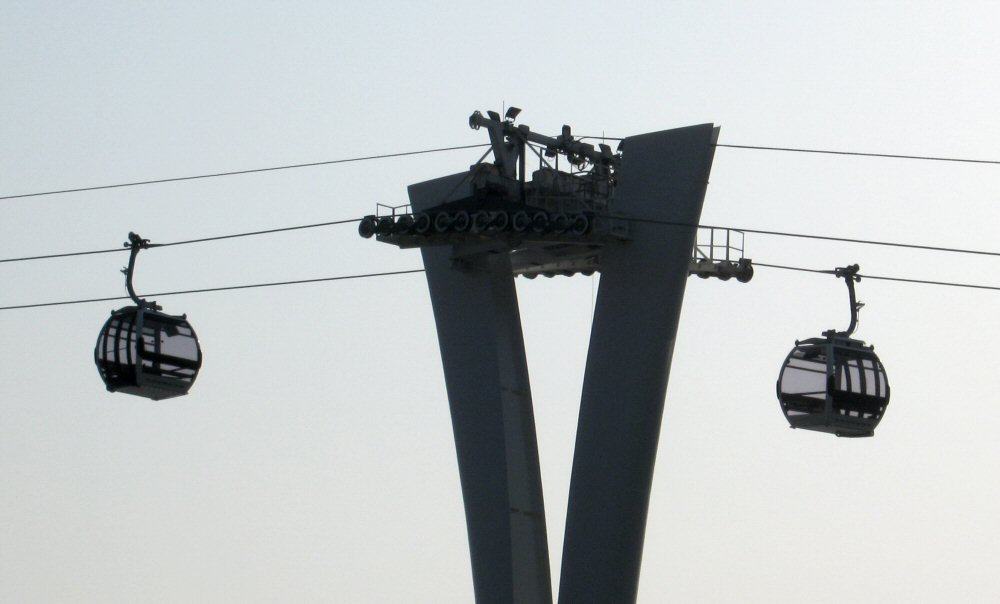
Two gondolas approaching the north intermediate tower

In May 2012, TfL said that the cable car would be running by the summer of 2012, and that while there were no plans to have it open before the 2012 Olympic Games, there would be plans in place in case it was opened in time.

=== Opening ===
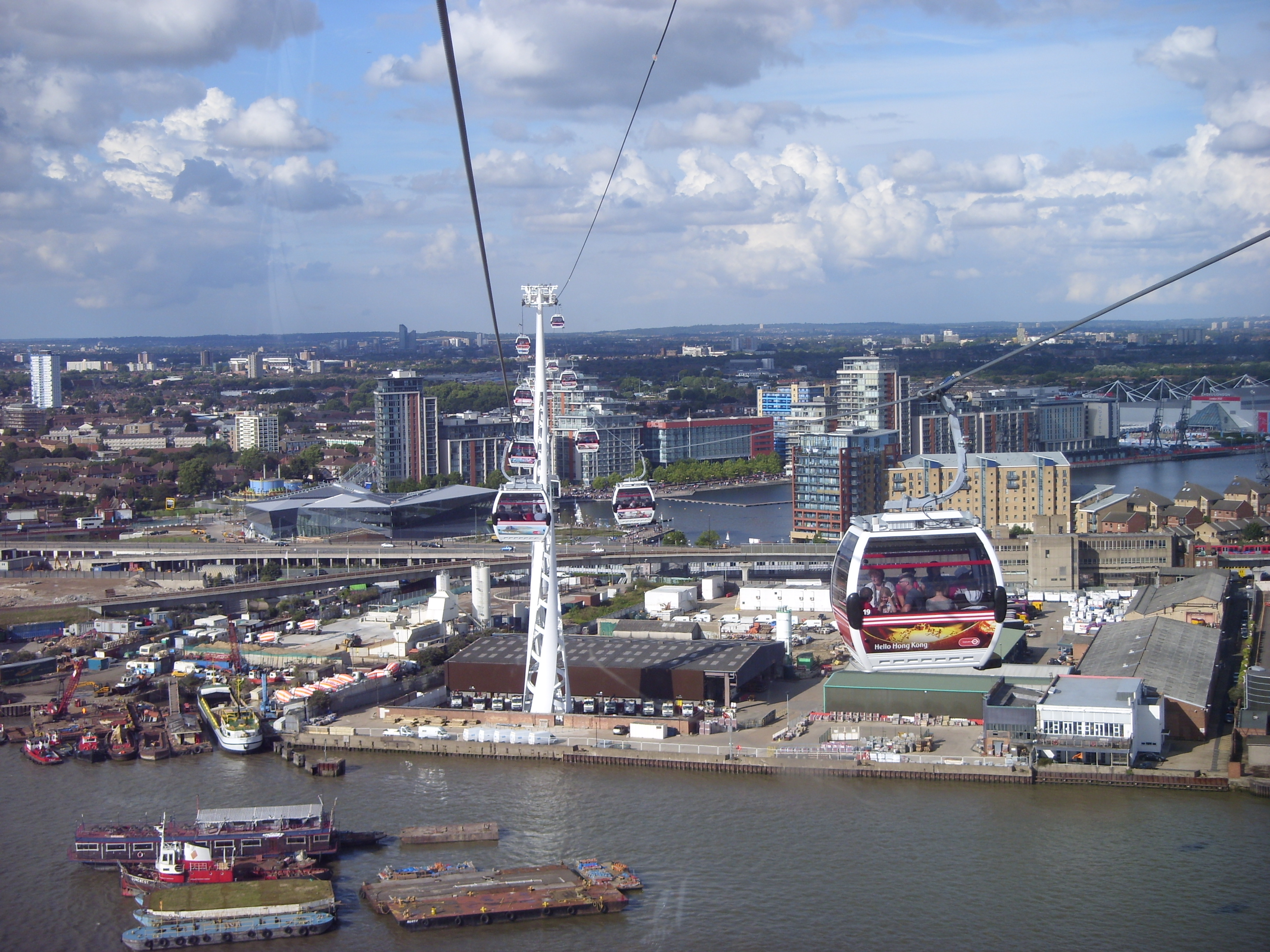
View from a car towards ExCeL

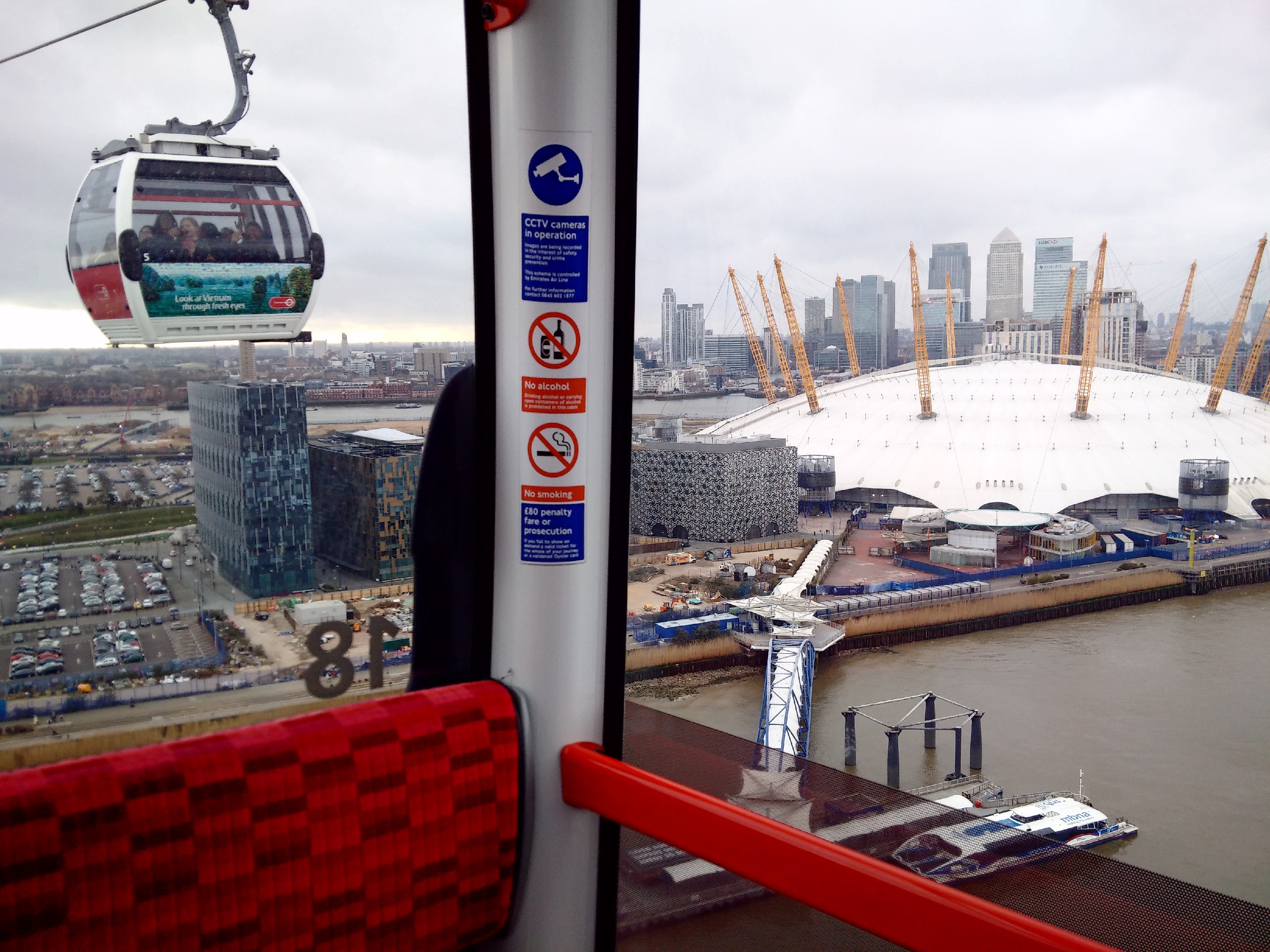
View from a car towards The O2

The public opening took place at noon on 28 June 2012, almost a month before the Opening Ceremony of the games. TfL reported that the total cost of the project was about £60 million, of which £45 million went towards construction. It estimates that the service can carry 2,500 people per hour.

The Emirates Air Line route was added to the London Tube map in June 2012. It was the first to have the sponsoring company's logo shown on the map. Similar to the representation of the Docklands Light Railway, the cable car route was displayed as a triple red stripe rather than a solid line, to distinguish it from London Underground lines.

The service's logo was a red cartouche containing the Emirates logo and the TfL roundel, to reflect the corporate sponsorship by the airline. As with the marketing of the London Eye, the transit of the cable car is referred to as a "flight" and marketing literature borrows language from the airline industry, such as referring to tickets as "boarding passes".

=== Expiry of Emirates branding ===
The deal with TfL for Emirates Air Line branding, bringing in £3.6 million per year, expired on 28 June 2022. However, no sponsor had been found for the cable car at the end of the contract, even at less than a quarter of the price.

It was reported that a senior TfL executive had joked that a storm, which hit London in February 2022, had been their "last hope" for discontinuing the service without loss of face.

=== New sponsor ===
In September 2022, it was announced that the technology company IFS AB would be the new sponsor beginning in October, and that the line would be renamed the IFS Cloud Cable Car. The initial sponsorship deal lasts five years, with a break after two years, and will cost £420,000 per year. The sponsorship deal also allows TfL to temporarily rebrand the cable car with other commercial sponsors, such as Pokémon in August 2022. TfL did note that the cable car "makes a profit", despite the substantial reduction in sponsorship income. The sponsorship deal came to an end on 18 March 2026.

== Operation ==
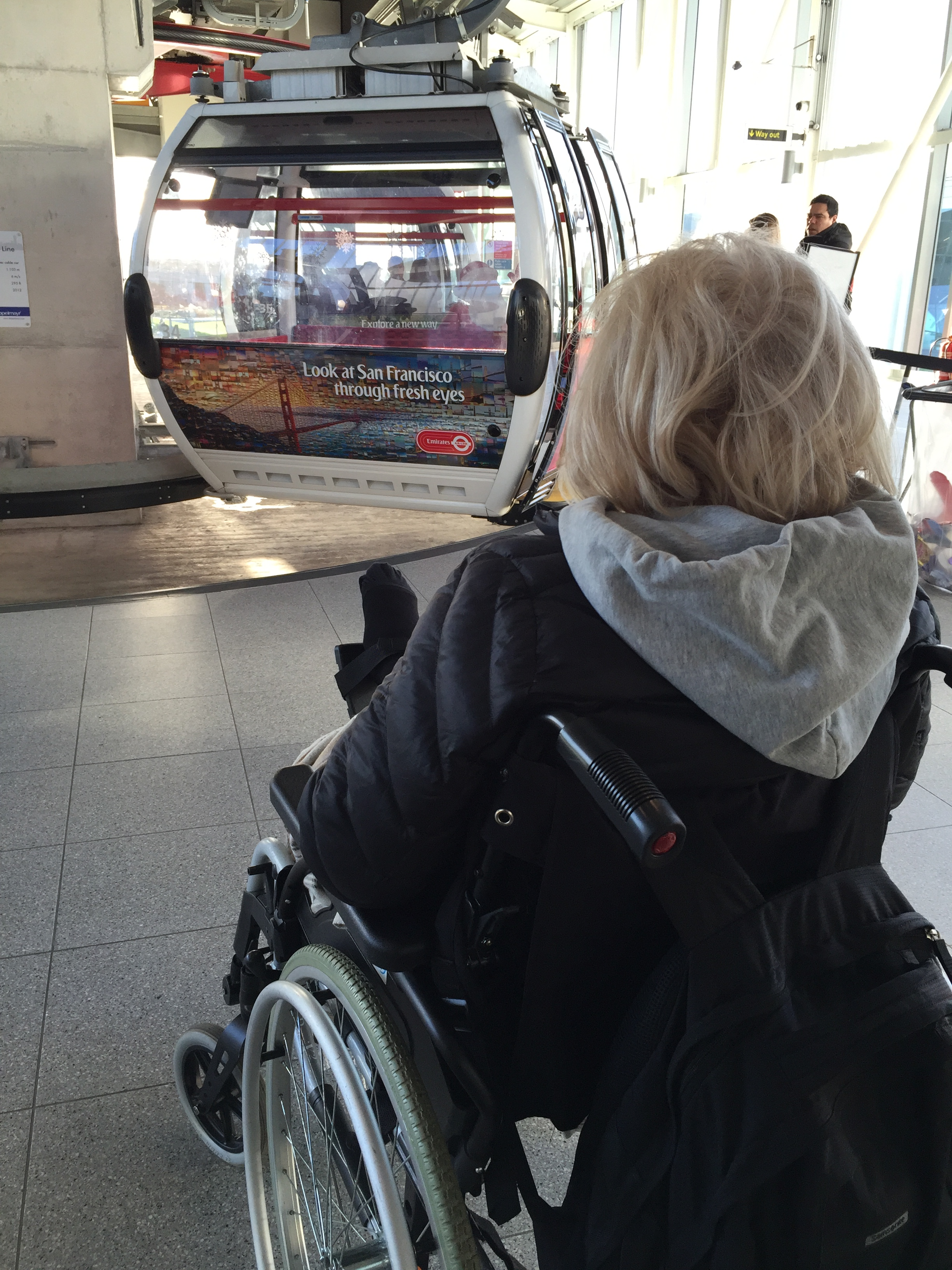
Boarding passenger gondola at Royal Victoria

The cable car is based on monocable detachable gondola (MDG) technology, a system which uses a single cable for both propulsion and support, used also on the Metrocable in Medellín, Colombia. The MDG system was reportedly cheaper and quicker to install than a more complex three-cable system which would have allowed larger-capacity cars.

There are 36 passenger gondolas, of which 34 are in use at any one time, with a maximum capacity of ten passengers each. All passenger gondolas are ready for disabled persons using wheelchairs, including those ones with leg rest extensions. There are also two (open) engineers' gondolas for use by maintenance staff.

The line was initially operated by its builders, Mace. On 28 June 2024, FirstGroup took over the operation, with an initial five-year contract and the option to extend it for a further three years.

In 2020, the running hours were 07:00–22:00 from Monday to Thursday, 07:00–23:00 Friday, 08:00–23:00 Saturday, 09:00–22:00 Sunday from 1 April to 30 September, finishing an hour earlier from Sunday to Thursday the rest of the year. The duration of a single crossing is ten minutes (reduced to five minutes in rush hour as the service speed is increased). The system has a capacity of 4,080 passengers an hour, 62,000 per day and up to 500,000 people a week in summer.

== Fares ==
From 1 March 2022, the adult pay-as-you-go fare was £6, with the child fare 50% of the adult fare. A reduced fare was available when paid with a pay-as-you-go Oyster card, or on presentation of a valid non-PAYG Oyster or Travelcard (the cable car is not fully integrated into Transport for London's ticketing system). To encourage use of the service for commuting, further discounts are offered with a multi-journey ticket which allows ten journeys within a twelve-month period. The London Assembly and the Liberal Democrats have called for full fare integration. The £1 discount for Oyster and Travelcard holders was removed in March 2023.

	Single fare	Multi-journey
Adult	£6.00	£1.70 (£17.00/10 trips)
Child	£3.00	£1.70 (£17.00/10 trips)

== Stations ==
=== Royal Docks ===
The eastern end of the cable car line (51.5077°N 0.0179°E) is at the Royal Docks, home to the ExCeL exhibition centre and the new City Hall. The closest interchange to the Docklands Light Railway is at Royal Victoria station, with an out-of-station interchange distance of approximately 200 m (660 ft).

=== Greenwich Peninsula ===
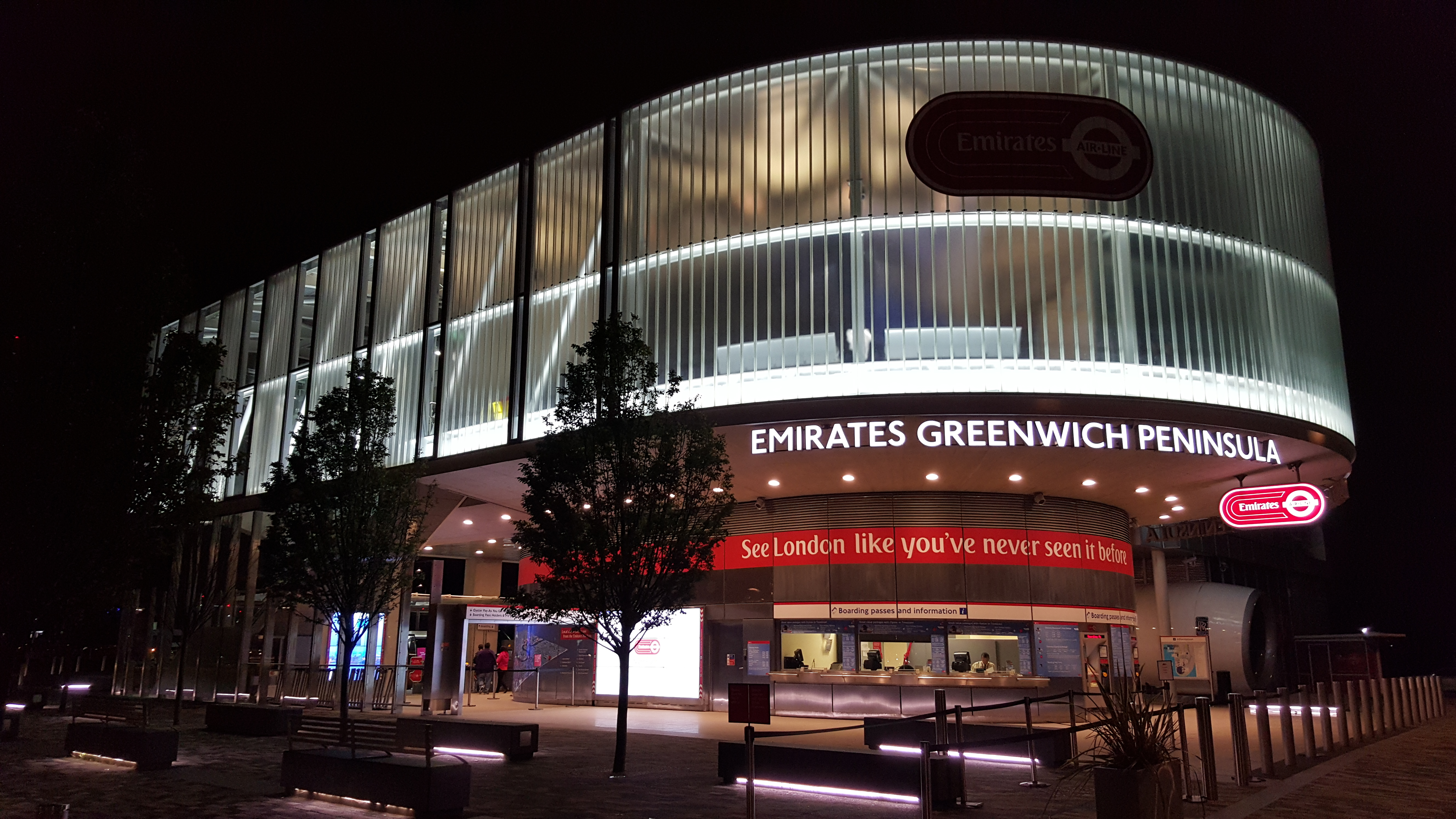
The station, then branded Emirates Greenwich Peninsula, at night

The western end of the cable car line (51.4998°N 0.0083°E) is within walking distance of The O2. The closest interchange with the London Underground is at North Greenwich. The nearest London River Services is at North Greenwich Pier and local London Buses services at North Greenwich bus station.

== Ridership ==
In the second week of October 2012 about 42,500 journeys were made. Journeys made fell to 23,000 for the same week in 2013.

In November 2012, after the Olympics, passenger numbers dropped to less than 10% of capacity. Fewer than 0.01% of journeys were made on discounted commuter fares which were 10 for £16.

In November 2013, it was reported that there were only four Oyster card users qualifying for a discount available to people making more than five journeys a week during one week in October. In the previous year, in the same week the number of card users was making regular journeys was 16. Boris Johnson had claimed Londoners would continue flocking to it (the cable car service).

In 2020, during the COVID-19 pandemic, the cable car offered free travel to key workers who needed to reach the Nightingale Hospital at ExCeL London; the hospital was later found unnecessary, and mothballed.

In 2023, the annual ridership was 1,474,546.

== Criticisms ==
Critics of the cable car have dismissed it as an impractical transport solution, which will appeal to tourists at peak times but is unlikely to attract a large number of cross-river locals or commuters due to its location and the cost of tickets. The Guardian suggested in 2013 it was a "white elephant". There has also been criticism of the project's £24 million-plus cost to taxpayers, caused by a budget overrun.

The cable car's location has also caused controversy, with advocates of walking and cycling favouring a Sustrans-sponsored plan for a walking and cycling bridge east of Tower Bridge between Rotherhithe and Canary Wharf.

The scheme was also criticised because the original sponsorship contract forbade the use of funds from Israel, which the United Arab Emirates did not recognise diplomatically at that time. It imposed restrictions on "(i) any Competitor; or (ii) any person who is a national of, or who is registered, incorporated, established or whose principal place of business is in a country with which the United Arab Emirates does not at the date of this Contract or at any relevant point during the Term maintain diplomatic relations." The contract also forbade the mayor or Transport for London from criticising the governments or royal families of the United Arab Emirates, or the contract. The clause regarding Israel was later removed.

== See also ==
- Crossings of the River Thames
