= North Greenwich bus station =

Bus station in London, England

Coordinates: 51.5006°N 0.0027°E

North Greenwich Bus Station
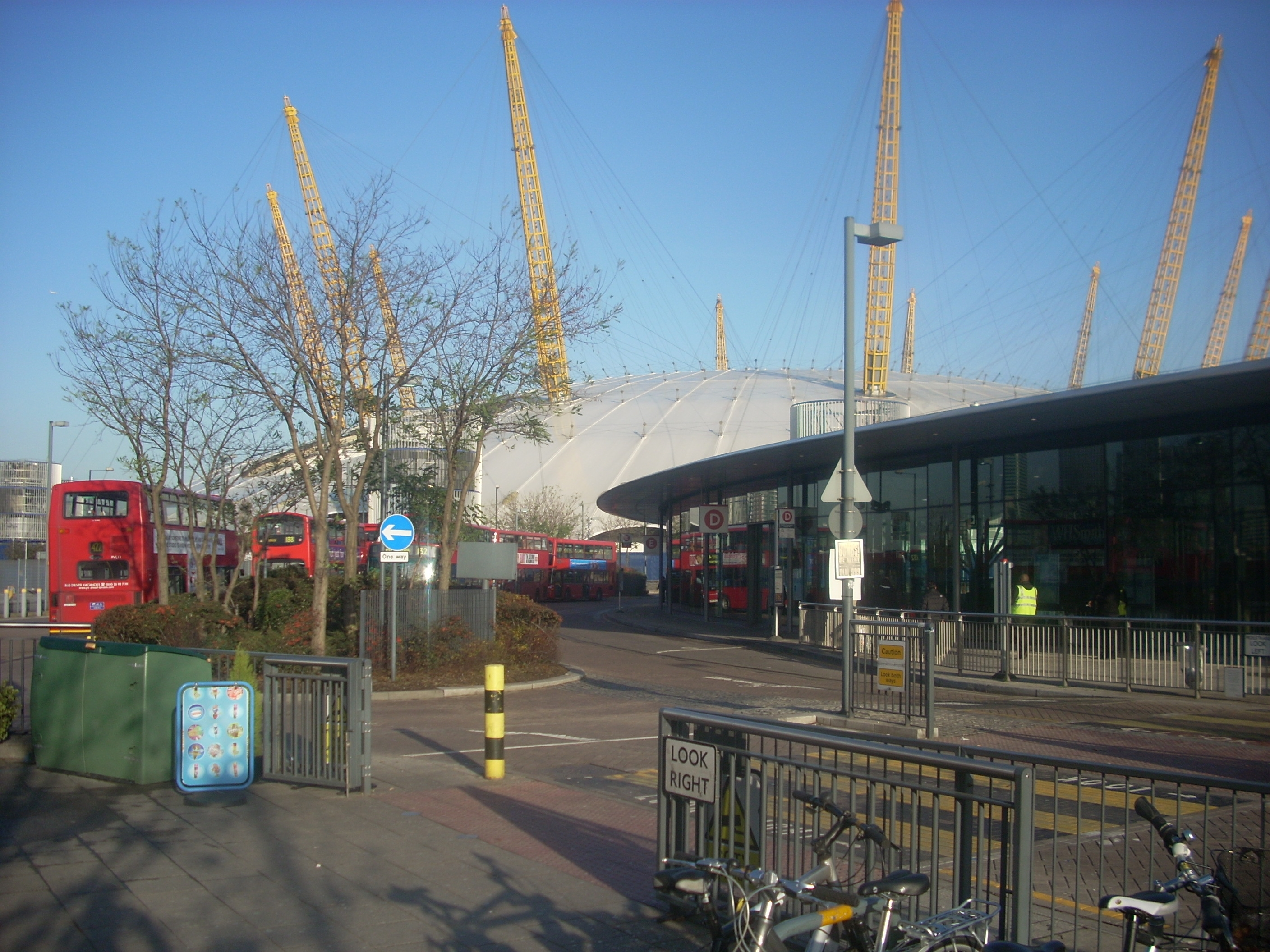
- The bus station in 2009

General information
- Location: Greenwich Peninsula; Royal Borough of Greenwich
- Operator: Transport for London
- Bus routes: 108, 108D, 129, 132, 161, 180, 188, 335, 422, 486, N472 and SL11
- Bus stands: 5
- Bus operators: London Central; Arriva London; Stagecoach London
- Connections: North Greenwich Underground station

Construction
- Architect: Foster and Partners

History
- Opened: 1999
Location

North Greenwich Bus Station serves the area of North Greenwich in the Royal Borough of Greenwich, Greater London, England. The station is owned and maintained by Transport for London.

The bus station is next to the North Greenwich station and situated approximately 100 metres away from the O_{2} arena.

== History ==
The Jubilee line extension included a station at North Greenwich, which would include a large car park and bus station. Construction on the tube station began in 1993. In 1996, Greenwich was chosen as the site for the Millennium Experience, with the under construction station considered to be a key part of the transport infrastructure.

Initial designs for the bus station were by North Greenwich station architects Alsop, Lyall and Störmer – with a colourful "L" shaped roof, representing a missing letter from Millennium. Foster and Partners were instead chosen to design the station in 1996, with the design incorporating a sweeping aerofoil shaped roof canopy, with extensive use of glass.

North Greenwich Transport Interchange opened around the same time as the tube station in May 1999 as part of the Jubilee line extension. The Millennium Dome was the main attraction during that time. The bus and tube stations are located quite close to the southern portals of the Blackwall Tunnel.

The bus station is accessible via escalator from the tube station. There are five stands within the bus station.

=== Future replacement ===
As part of the development of the Greenwich Peninsula, the bus station building will be replaced, built around a new multistorey car park. Initial proposals for a new bus station designed by Santiago Calatrava did not materialise.

== Gallery ==
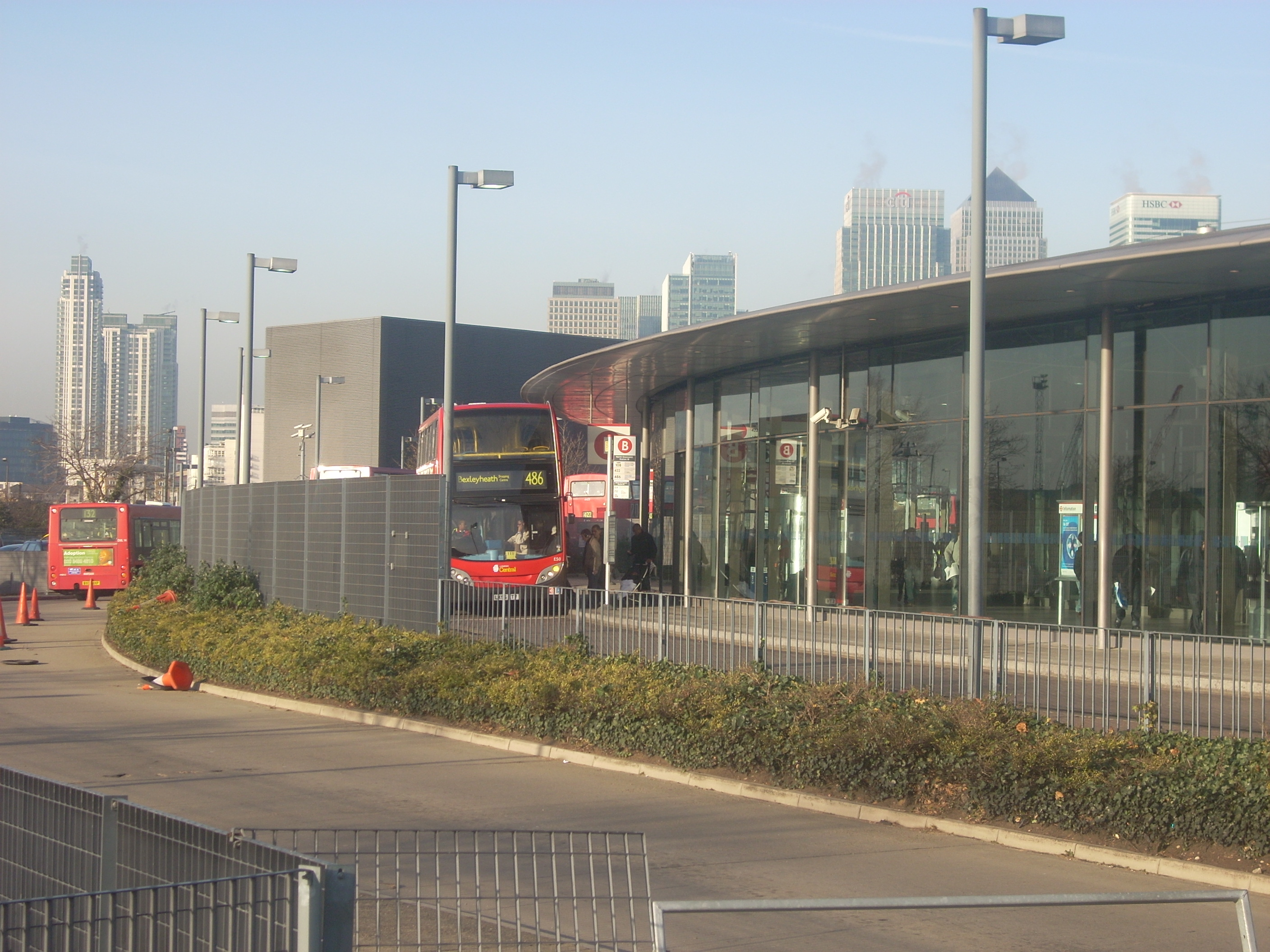
The bus station with Canary Wharf in the distance

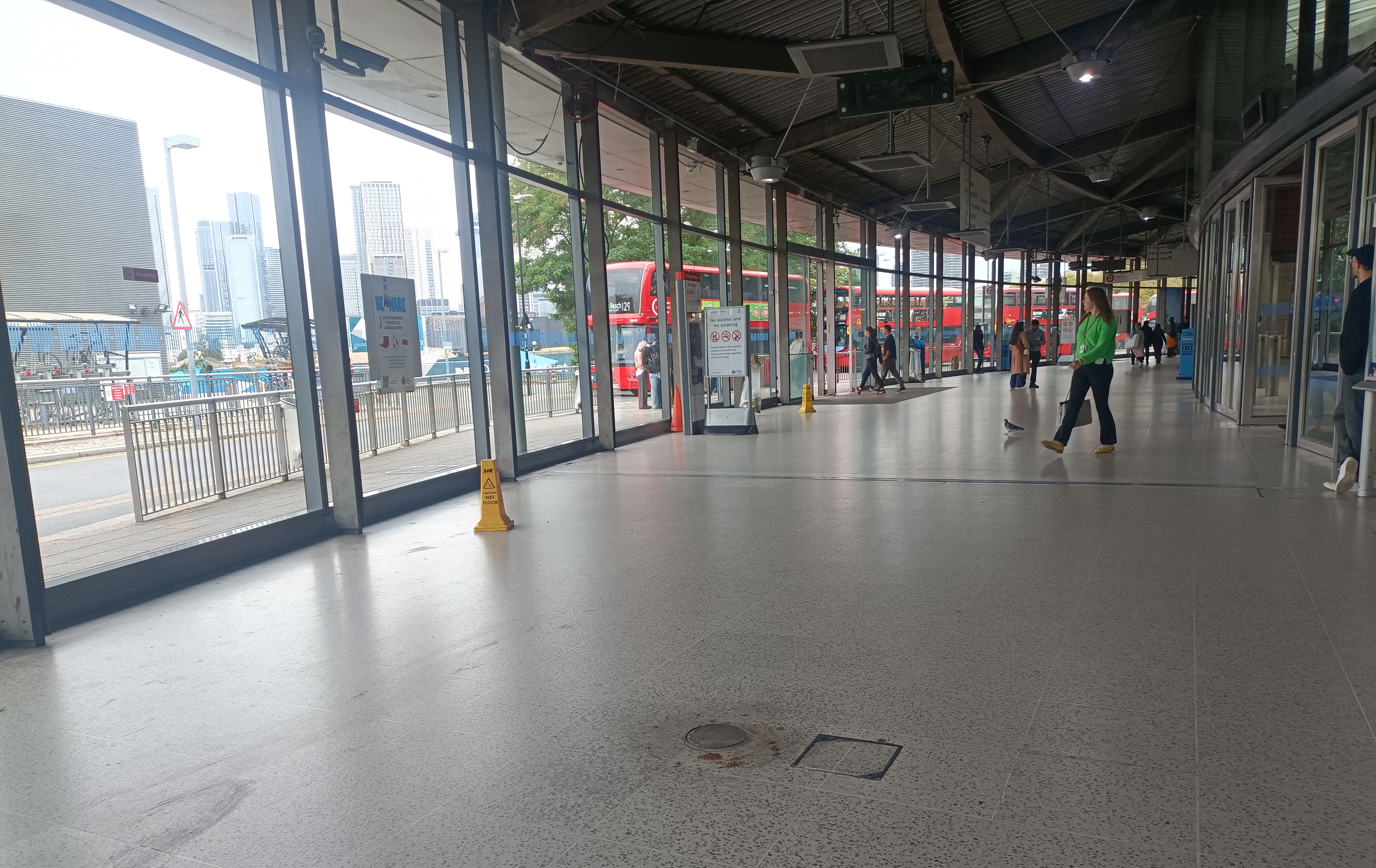
The interior of the bus station
