= North Greenwich tube station =

London Underground station

North Greenwich
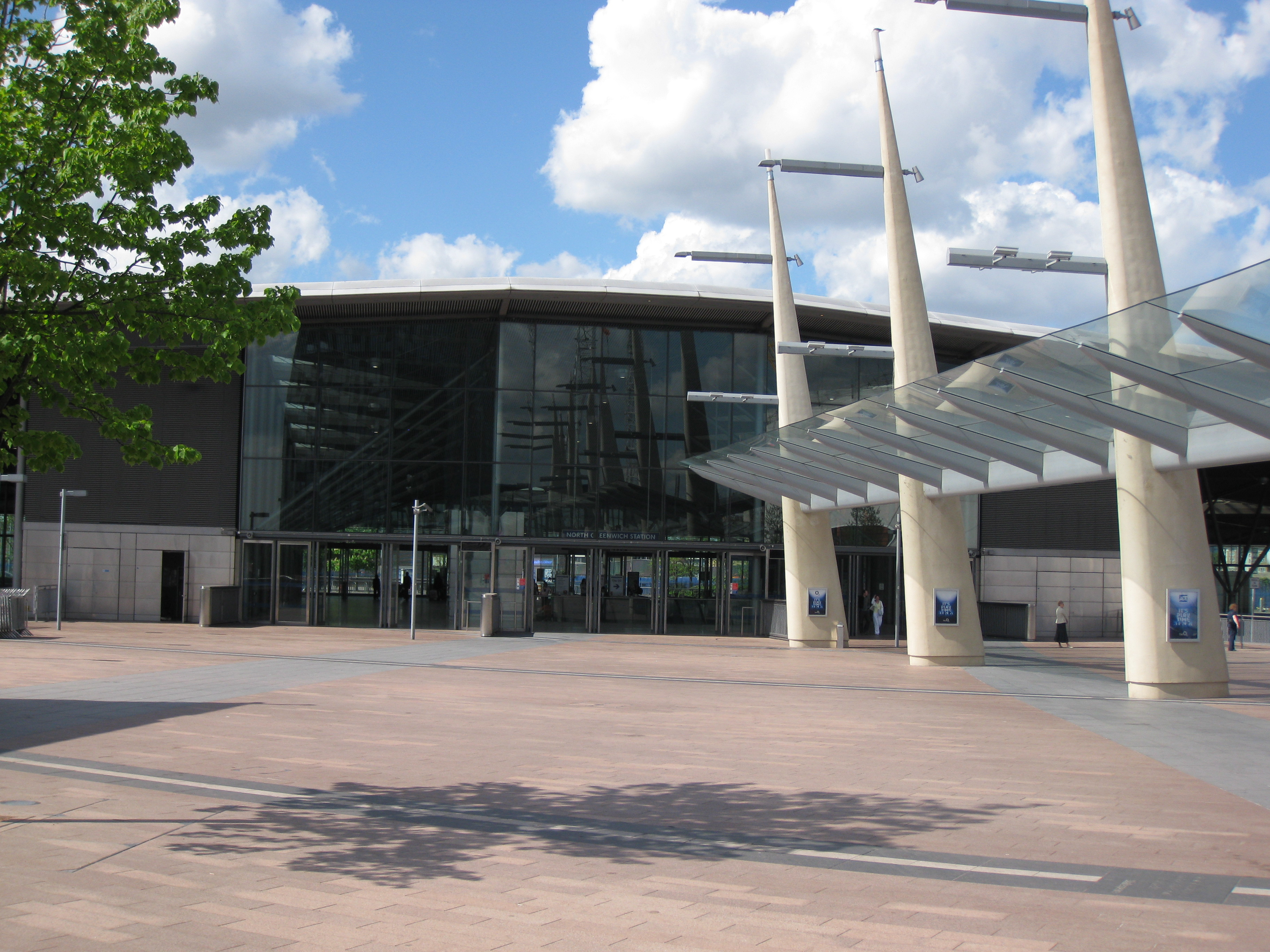
- Main station entrance, April 2009
- Interactive map of North Greenwich

General information
- Location: Greenwich Peninsula
- Local authority: Royal Borough of Greenwich
- Managed by: London Underground
- Owner: Transport for London
- Number of platforms: 3
- Accessible: Yes
- Fare zone: 2 and 3

London Underground annual entry and exit
- 2021: ▲11.28 million
- 2022: ▲21.20 million
- 2023: ▲23.17 million
- 2024: ▲22.73 million
- 2025: ▼23.18 million

Railway companies
- Original company: London Regional Transport

Key dates
- 14 May 1999: Opened

Other information
- External links: TfL station info page
- Coordinates: 51.500556°N 0.003611°E

North Greenwich is a London Underground station at the northernmost tip of the Royal Borough of Greenwich. It is on the Jubilee line, between Canary Wharf and Canning Town stations. It is in both London fare zone 2 and zone 3.

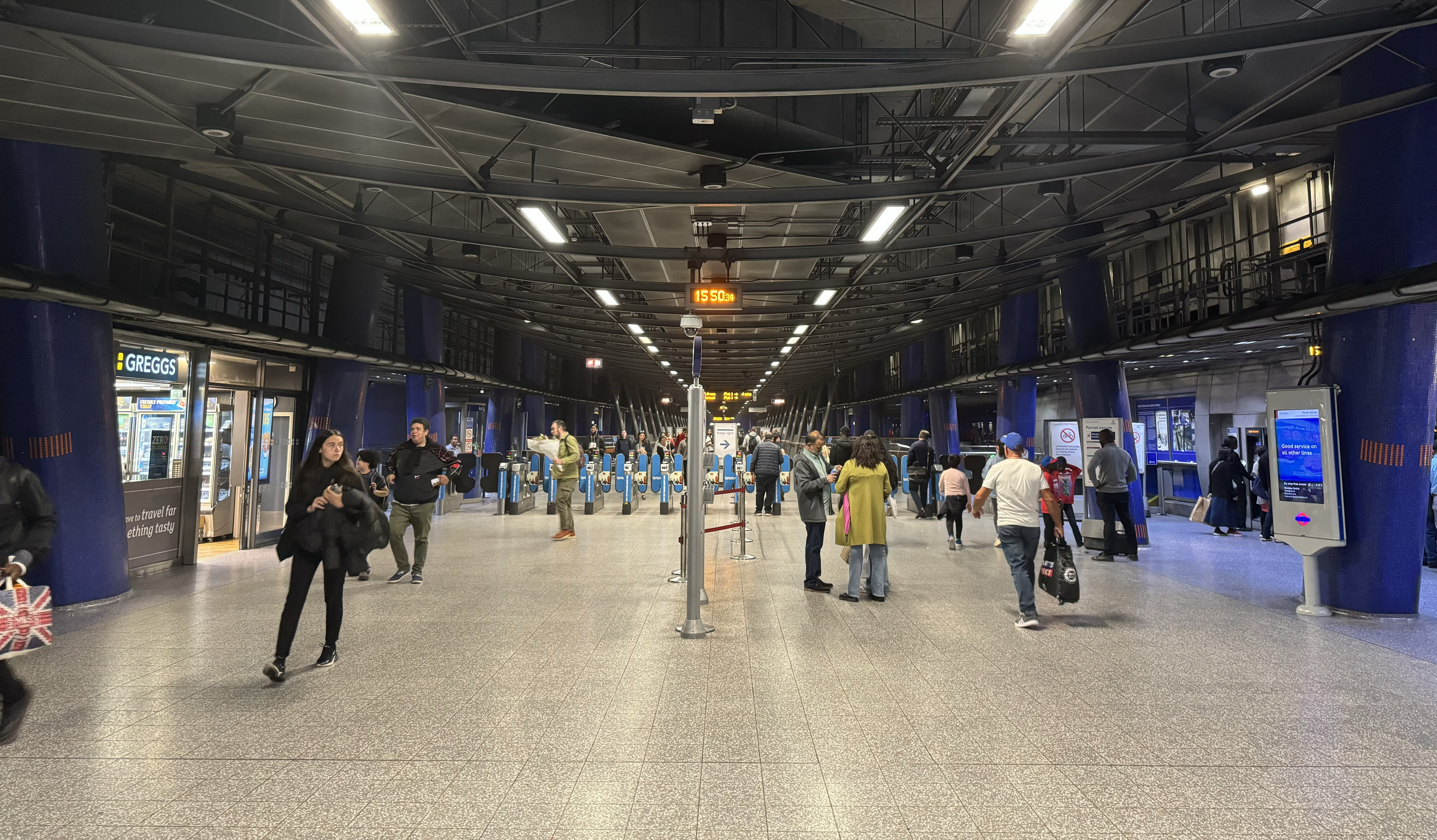
The station lower concourse between the escalators and the Oyster ticketing system, July 2024

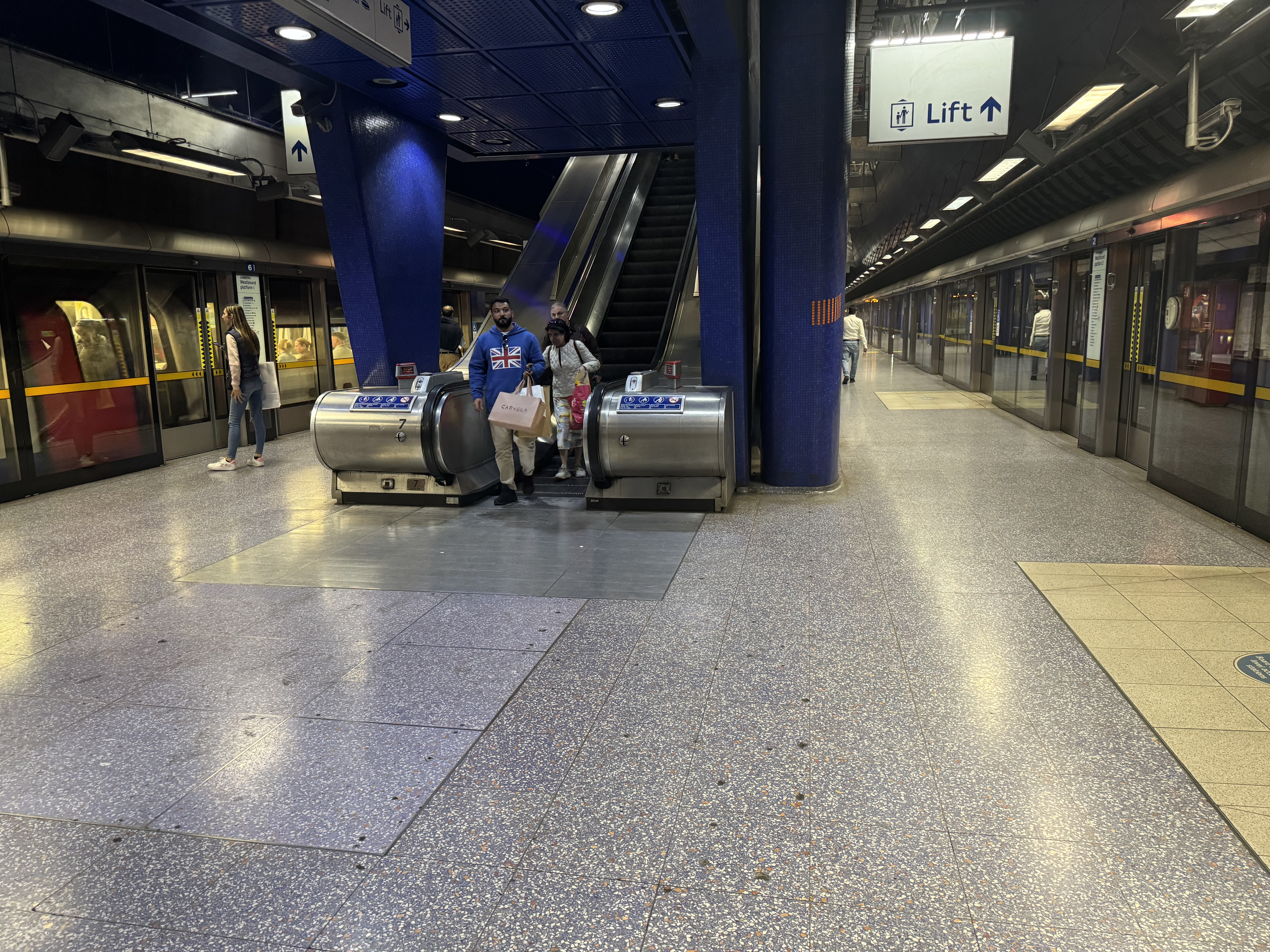
Jubilee line westbound platforms 1 and 2, July 2024

The station opened on 14 May 1999. It is adjacent to The O2 (originally the Millennium Dome) at the northern end of the Greenwich Peninsula, on the south bank of the Thames, and is the easternmost below-ground station on the line.

== History ==
An Underground station was first proposed for the Greenwich Peninsula in a government report on the redevelopment of London's Docklands published in 1973. The proposal, part of the then unbuilt Fleet line, proposed a line running from Charing Cross via Fenchurch Street to Beckton, with stations on each side at Millwall and Custom House. The proposal was developed during the 1970s as the Fleet line developed into the Jubilee line. The route was approved in 1980, but financial constraints meant that the route was not proceeded with.

In the early 1990s, the Jubilee Line Extension was proposed to serve the growing Docklands developments. A station was originally planned at Blackwall north of the river, but the line was diverted between Canary Wharf and Stratford underneath the Thames to serve the Greenwich peninsula. The line would therefore serve Port Greenwich, a planned housing development on the site of disused gasworks. It was initially unclear whether or not a station would be built on the site, with British Gas plc contributed £25 million towards the opening of the station.

Architects Alsop, Lyall and Störmer were chosen by Roland Paoletti to design the station, with initial proposals of the station box open to the air as a sunken garden, with ticket hall suspended above the tracks. To allow for future development above the station, a decision was made to put a roof on the station instead.

Construction began in 1993, with the site on the Greenwich peninsula used for tunnelling under the River Thames. In 1996, Greenwich was chosen as the site for the Millennium Experience, with the under construction station considered to be a key part of the transport infrastructure. The station was opened on 14 May 1999, by Deputy Prime Minister John Prescott. During 2000, thousands of visitors used the station to visit the Millennium Experience at the Millennium Dome. In May 2001, the station car park was opened. Originally with 800 spaces, it now has 509 parking spaces for use by Underground customers.

On 20 October 2016, the military conducted a controlled explosion on an improvised explosive device at North Greenwich after a passenger spotted an unattended bag filled with "wires and an alarm clock" aboard a Jubilee line train. No injuries were reported, and a suspect was later detained. The man, Damon Smith, was convicted of possession of an explosive substance with intent and was sentenced to 15 years' imprisonment.

== Station design ==
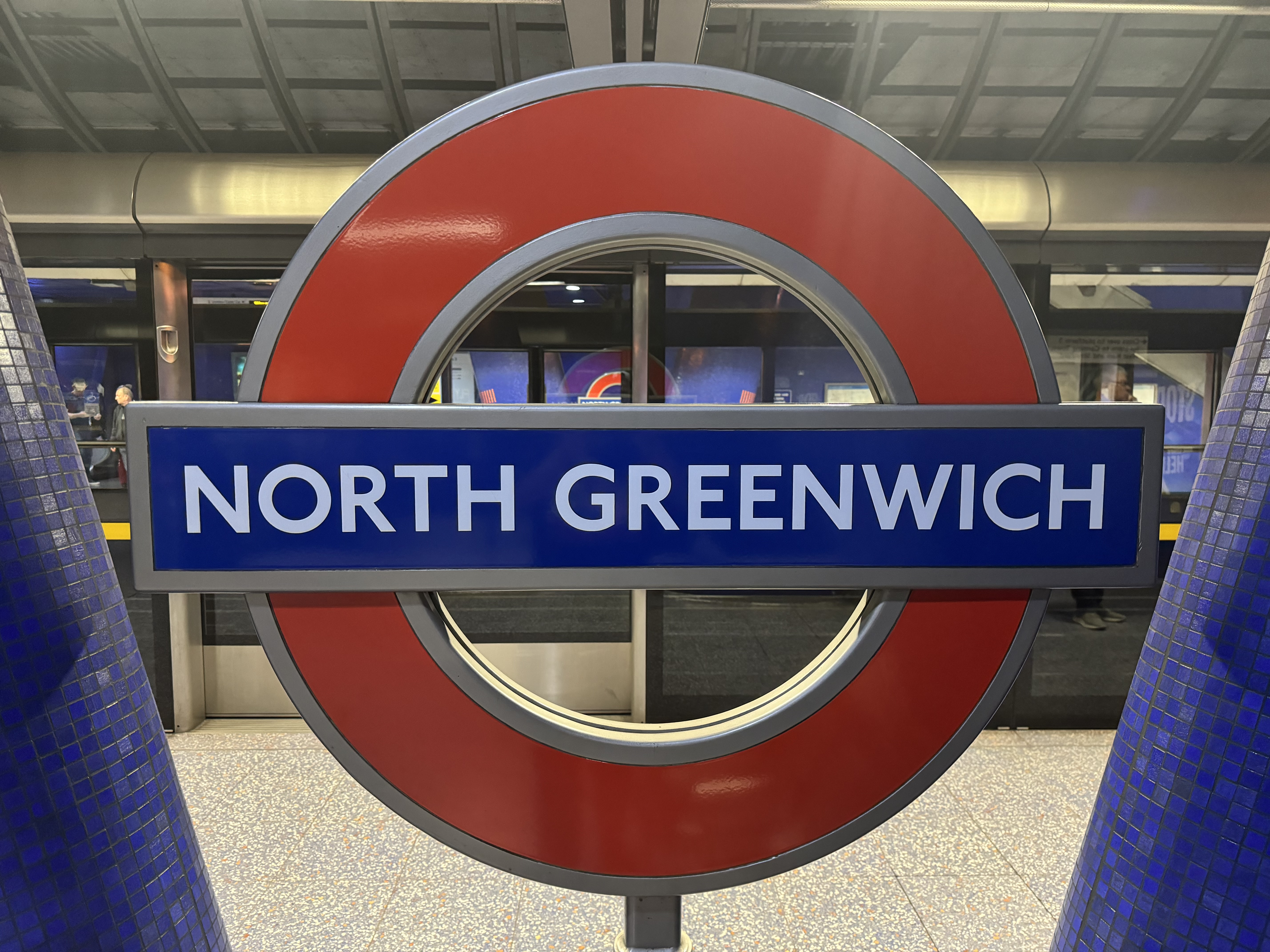
North Greenwich station roundel

North Greenwich is one of the largest stations on the Jubilee line, capable of handling around 20,000 passengers an hour, having been designed to cope with the large number of visitors expected at the Millennium Dome (now The O2 Arena).

The striking blue-tiled and glazed interior, with raking concrete columns rearing up inside the huge underground space, was designed by the architects practice Alsop, Lyall and Störmer. The blue tiles on walls were inspired by the design of MTR stations in Hong Kong, where every station adopts a livery in order to help passengers to recognise their alighting stop. As with other stations on the Jubilee Line Extension, all platforms are equipped with platform screen doors.

The eastern wall of the station box was built with provision for a future branch of the Jubilee line south through Greenwich Peninsula, for possible services towards the Royal Docks, London City Airport, or Thamesmead.

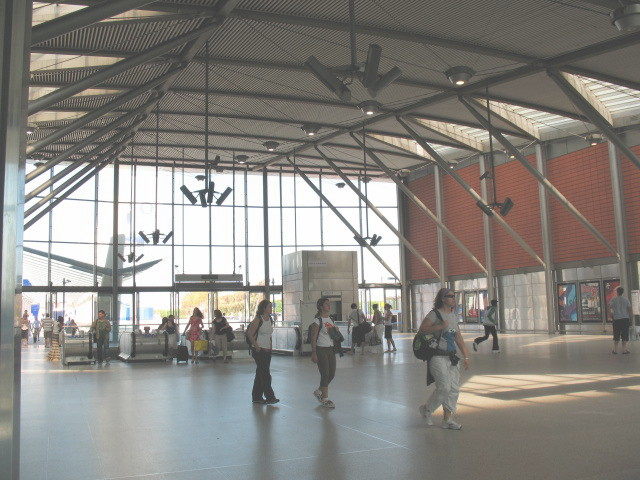
Station concourse

== Connections ==
The bus station is interconnected and above the tube station on the surface for direct transfer with a number London Buses day and nighttime routes .

The IFS Cloud Cable Car opened nearby on 28 June 2012, providing a link between the Greenwich Peninsula and the Royal Victoria Dock and ExCeL London.

Preceding station	London Underground	Following station
Canary Wharf towards Stanmore	Jubilee line	Canning Town towards Stratford
Abandoned Plans
Preceding station	London Underground	Following station
Millwall towards Stanmore	Jubilee line Phase 3 (1980) (never constructed)	Custom House towards Woolwich Arsenal or Beckton
