= Greenwich Millennium Village =

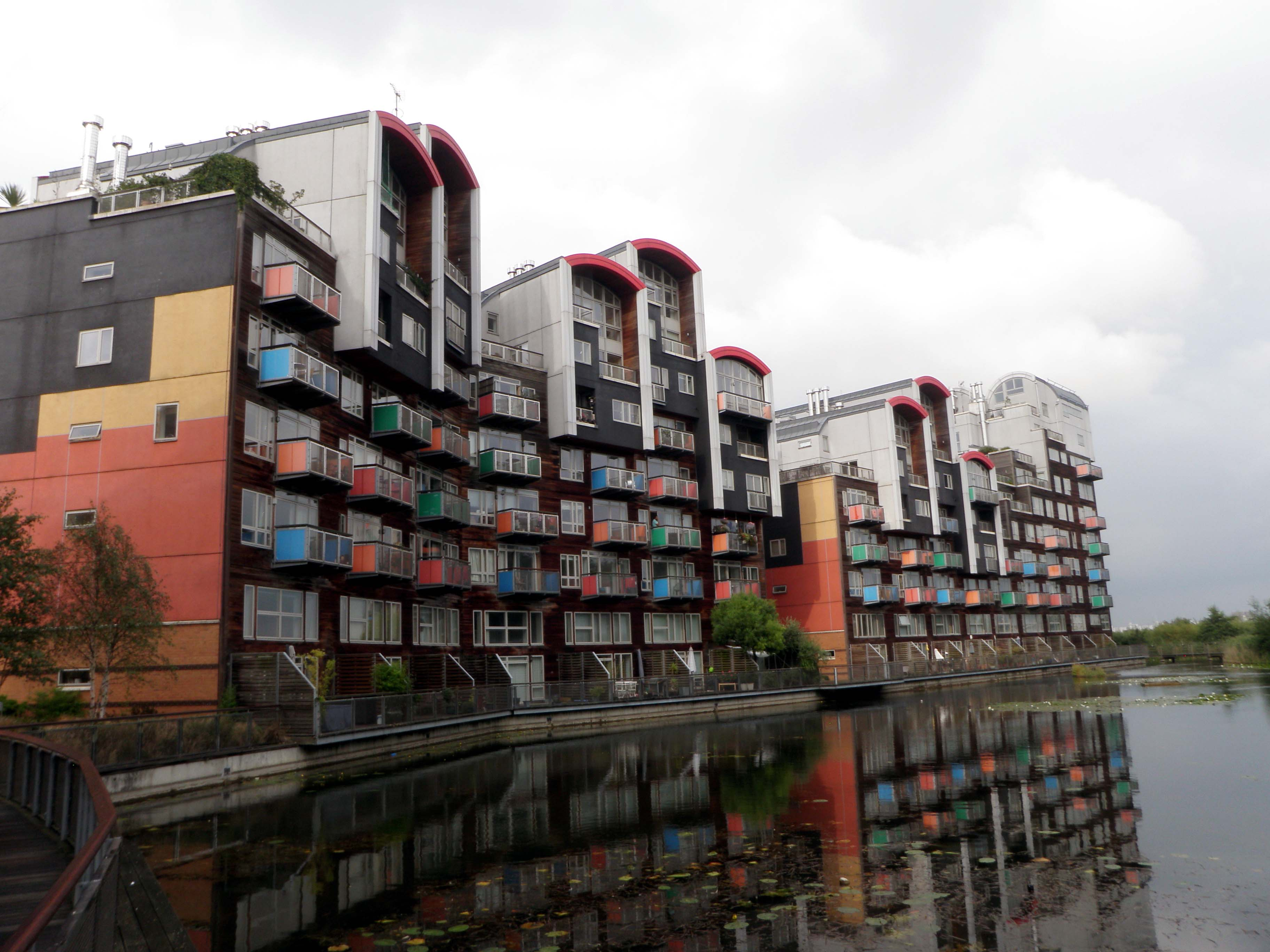
- Buildings in Renaissance Walk

Project
- Opening date: 2000s onwards
- Developer: English Partnerships
- Architect: Ralph Erskine

Location
- Interactive map of Greenwich Millennium Village
- Location in London
- Coordinates: 51.495°N 0.014°E
- Country: England
- City: London
- Borough: Greenwich
- Location: Greenwich Peninsula

Greenwich Millennium Village (GMV) is a mixed-tenure modern development on an urban village model located on the Greenwich Peninsula in Greenwich, in south-east London, and part of the Millennium Communities Programme under English Partnerships (now renamed Homes and Communities Agency). The village is designed by architects Ralph Erskine and partners with EPR Architects Ltd as executive architect as part of the regeneration of the whole brownfield site of East Greenwich Gas Works. GMV is south of the former Millennium Dome, now renamed the O_{2}.

== Location ==
The village is on the southern banks of the River Thames, about one mile upstream (west) from the Thames Barrier and adjacent to the purpose-built Greenwich Peninsula Ecology Park, cycle paths and recreational areas. The village currently has the Millennium Primary School, a GP surgery, and a few shops. East of the village, at Peartree Wharf, is the Greenwich Yacht Club, a modern building provided by English Partnerships. The village is south of the O_{2} dome complex; commercial developments are situated to the south.

== Development ==
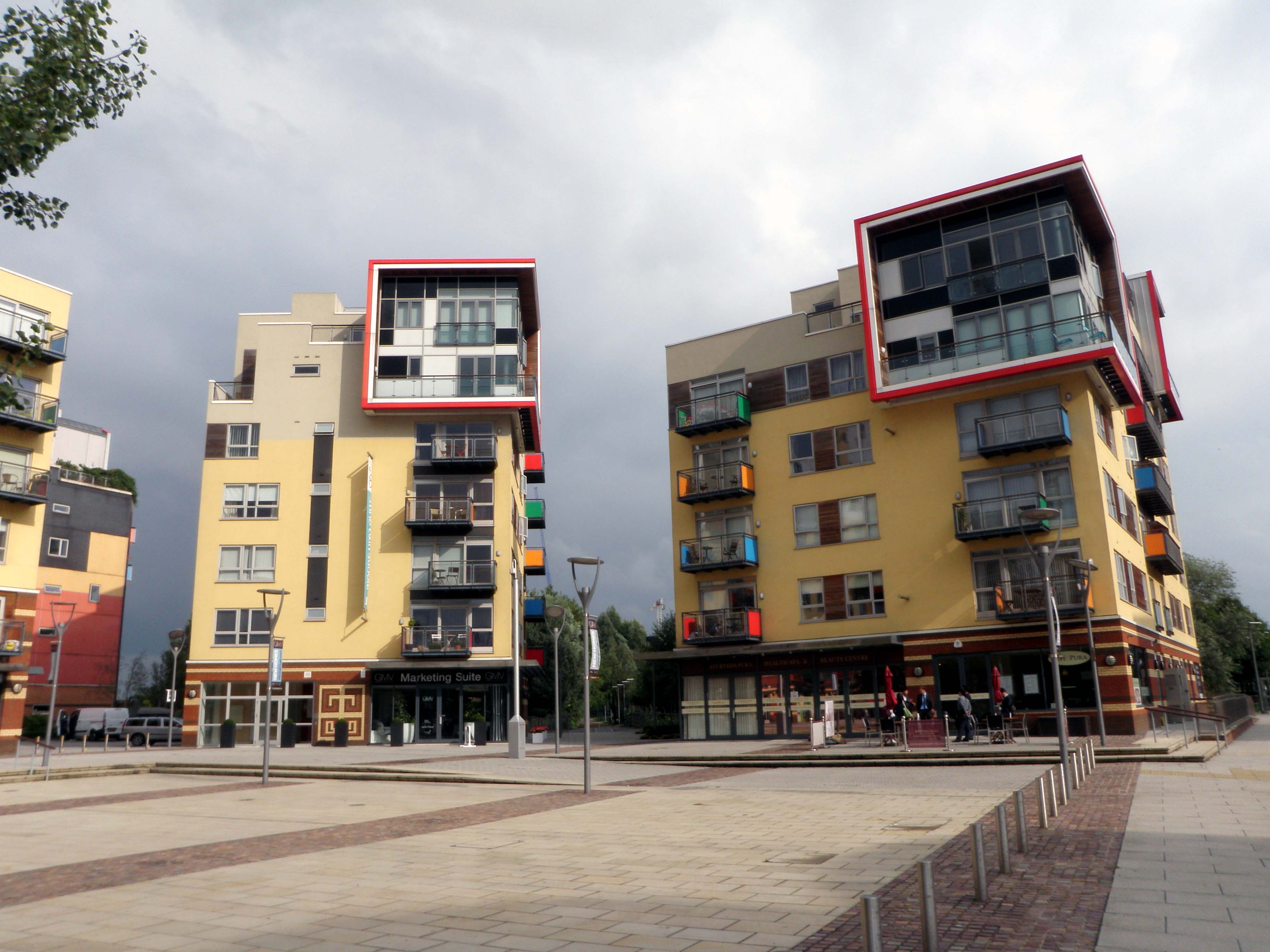
Village Square in the village

The village is being developed by a consortium of Countryside Properties and Taylor Wimpey. The development aimed to cut primary energy use by 80% using low-energy building techniques and renewable energy technologies. GMV was planned by the developers to continue to expand until about 2015, with its own integrated village shopping and community centres. By 2010, 1,098 flats and houses as well as a village square with shops had been completed. Of the units completed about 20% are affordable housing which are owned by a housing association which rents to those in social need as well as to key workers under shared ownership "rent to buy" purchase schemes.

In 2005, some GMV residents complained that the noise insulation in the Kilby Court blocks was inadequate.

== Transport ==
=== Buses ===
Greenwich Millennium Village is served by numerous London Buses routes, including 108, 129, 132, 161, 180, 335, 422, 486, Superloop route SL11 and night route N472

=== London Underground ===
The nearest station is North Greenwich on the Jubilee line.

=== National Rail ===
The nearest stations are Charlton and Westcombe Park for Southeastern services towards Dartford, London Cannon Street and London Charing Cross.

=== London River Services ===
The nearest pier is North Greenwich for Thames Clippers services towards Embankment, Greenwich and Woolwich Arsenal.

=== London Cable Car ===
The London Cable Car line opened in June 2012 and connects North Greenwich with the Royal Docks on the north side of the River Thames. Its southern terminal is located north of the Millennium Village, on the south side of Edmund Halley Way.

== In popular culture ==
The video for Lady Leshurr's Queen's Speech Ep.4 was filmed at the Greenwich Millennium Village.

The development was also the setting for BBC One ident “Windows” in 2006. Residents were seen using their windows to reflect sunlight into a ring. Filmed at the Greenwich Millennium Village in south east London and directed by Matthias Hoene. This ident was withdrawn in 2008 and was often used to introduce daytime programming.
