= Pilot Inn =

Pub and restaurant in London, England

Coordinates: 51°29′46″N 0°00′37″E

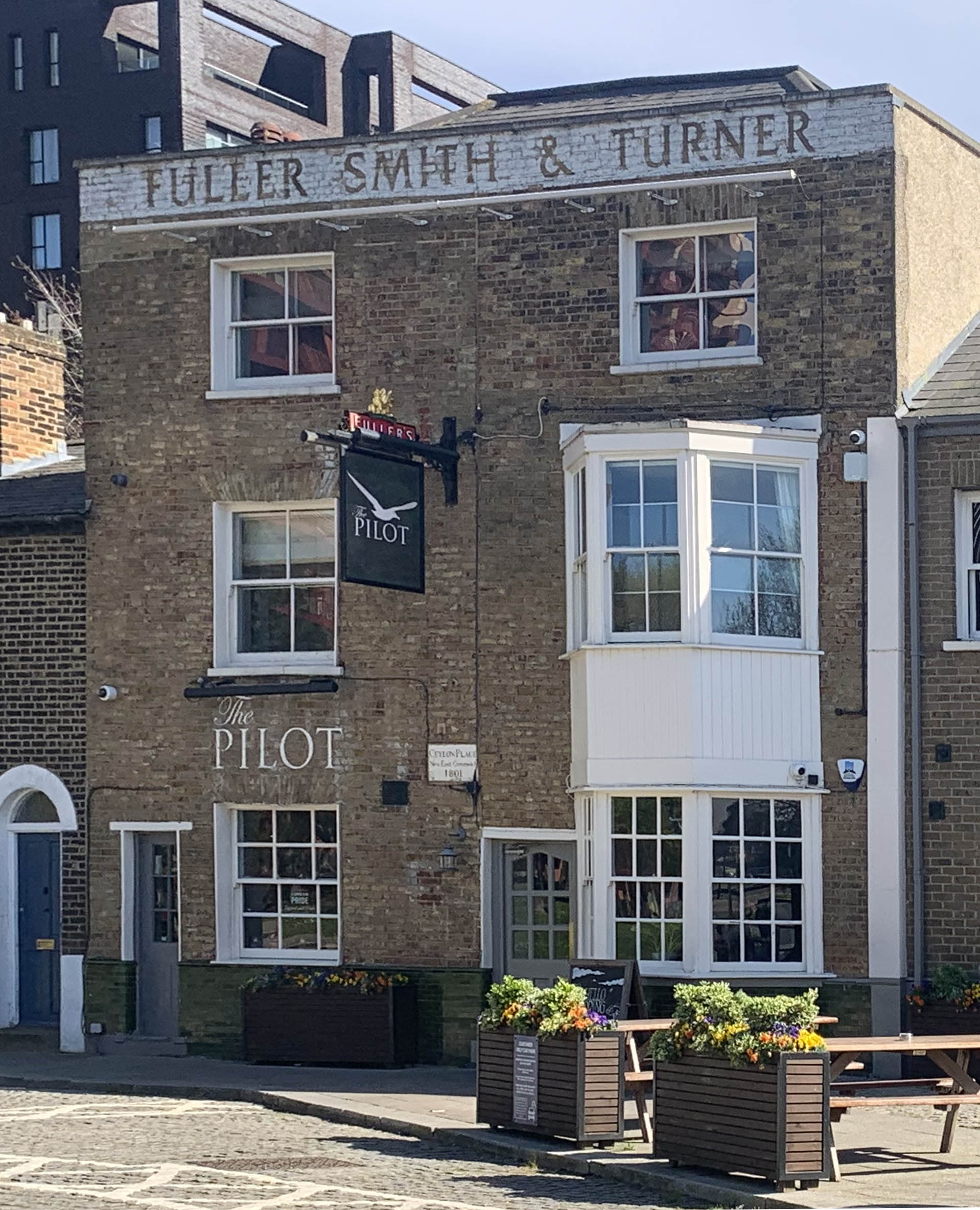
- Pilot Inn, Greenwich
- Interactive map of Pilot Inn

Restaurant information
- Established: 1801
- Food type: Gastropub
- Location: London, England
- Website: Official Site

The Pilot Inn is a historic public house situated at 68 River Way (formerly Ceylon Place) in the Greenwich Peninsula, southeast London.

Originally the 'Pilot Inn and Ferry', the pub first opened in 1801. Built by local landowner George Russell, it was located close to a tide mill (later replaced by a chemical works and then Blackwall Point Power Station), and its name has been associated with William Pitt the Younger, called 'The Pilot who weathered the storm' in a contemporary song.

It is adjacent to a terrace of eight cottages described as "a rare survival of late Georgian artisan housing" and which are grade II listed.
