= West Thurrock Power Station =

Coal-fired power station in Essex, England

- West Thurrock Power Station, 1973.
- Country: England
- Location: Essex, East of England
- Coordinates: 51.469573°N 0.288756°E
- Status: Decommissioned and demolished
- Construction began: 1957
- Commission date: 1962
- Decommission date: 1993
- Owner: As operator
- Operators: Central Electricity Generating Board (1962–1990); National Power (1990–1993)

Thermal power station
- Primary fuel: Coal
- Secondary fuel: Natural gas
- Site area: 37 hectare
- Chimneys: Two
- Cooling towers: None
- Cooling source: River water

Power generation
- Units operational: Two × 200 MW, three × 300 MW
- Units decommissioned: All
- Nameplate capacity: 1300 MW
- Annual net output: (See graph in text)

External links
- Commons: Related media on Commons

West Thurrock Power Station was a coal-fired power station on the River Thames at Stone Ness, West Thurrock in Essex. The station was at the northern end of the 400 kV Thames Crossing of the National Grid.

== History ==
The station was built by the Central Electricity Generating Board and, unlike most of the power stations further up the Thames, West Thurrock was built on a 37 hectare green field site, 1.5 miles west of Grays. Construction, which included the piling and landfilling of the marshy riverside, took several years, starting in 1957 and continuing until 1965 – although the first generator was commissioned in 1962. It was the first CEGB station designed to exceed 1000 MW, having a final output of 1300 MW. West Thurrock was one of the CEGB's twenty steam power stations with the highest thermal efficiency; in 1963–64 the thermal efficiency was 35.54 per cent, 35.78 per cent in 1964–5, and 35.70 per cent in 1965–66.

The architectural design was by Farmer and Dark. The station had two 200 MW units (built by CA Parsons and commissioned 1962 and 1963) and three of 300 MW units (by Associated Electrical Industries and commissioned 1964 and 1965) housed in a reinforced concrete turbine hall. The roof was of multiple transverse barrel vaults. The five boilers were built by Babcock & Wilcox and were unusual being open to the elements and were originally designed to burn pulverised coal. They were adapted to burn natural gas between 1971 and 1980, and heavy fuel oil burning facilities were added in 1985. The total steam capacity of boilers was 8,445,000 lb/hr (1064.1 kg/s). Steam pressure and temperature at the turbine stop valve was 2350 psi (162 bar) at 566 °C. The boilers were the first to have automated start up and shut down using a Ferranti Argus computer. Ash from the boilers was sold to a local factory and used to make building blocks. The station had two 175 m (574 ft) tall chimneys made from reinforced concrete.

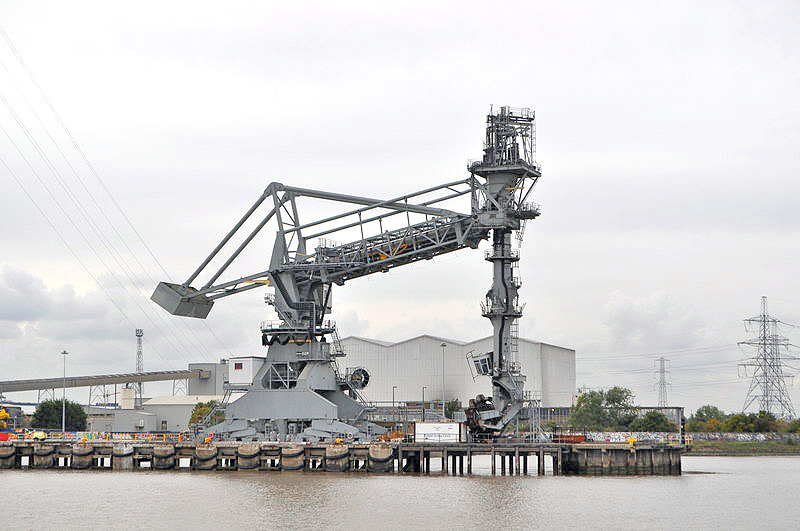
A bulk unloader from the power station still in use at West Thurrock Jetty, 2010

After the UK's electric supply industry was privatised in 1989, West Thurrock was operated by National Power. In 1992, one of the station's units were decommissioned. The station's other four units were decommissioned in 1993. The closure left a stockpile of nearly half a million tonnes of coal, which was transported downstream to the nearby Tilbury Power Station by Rhine barge.

After demolition part of the site was redeveloped as a works making industrial chemicals for the adjacent Procter & Gamble works and using the former coaling jetty. A proposal to build a large postal sorting office on the former fly-ash lagoons proved controversial due to the wildlife that had colonised the site.

An unusual feature of the site is the northern end of the pair of 192-metre tall pylons supporting the 400 kV link across the river Thames.

=== Electricity output ===
Electricity output for West Thurrock power station over the period 1964–1987 was as follows:

Electricity output for West Thurrock power station over the period 1963–1987. View source data.
