= East Greenwich Gas Works =

Former gas works in London

Coordinates: 51.49965°N 0.00483°E

The East Greenwich Gas Works of the South Metropolitan Gas Company was the last gas works to be built in London, and the most modern. Originally manufacturing town gas from coal brought in by river and exporting coke and chemicals, the plant was adapted to produce gas from oil in the 1960s. Nothing remains of any of the gas holders; the last gas holder, built in 1886, was dismantled in 2020.

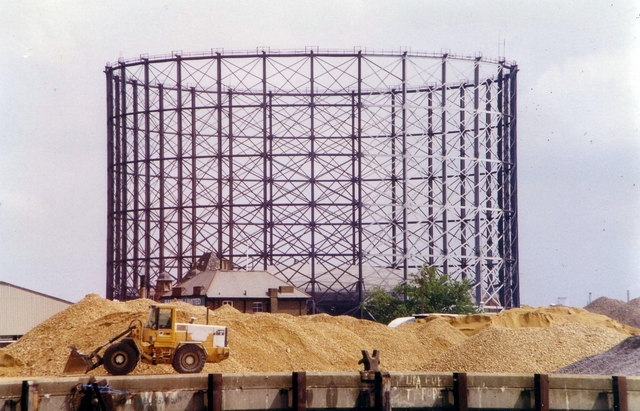
The site's last gas holder, dismantled in 2020.

== Location ==
Located on the Greenwich Peninsula by the Thames in south-east London, the works was built between 1881 and 1886. Most of the works was built on a greenfield site on Greenwich Marshes. The start of work on the site was complicated by proposals to build a dock system on the peninsula, similar to that on the Isle of Dogs across the river. Originally proposed in the 1850s, this plan was resurrected in the 1880s, but eventually came to nothing.

== History ==
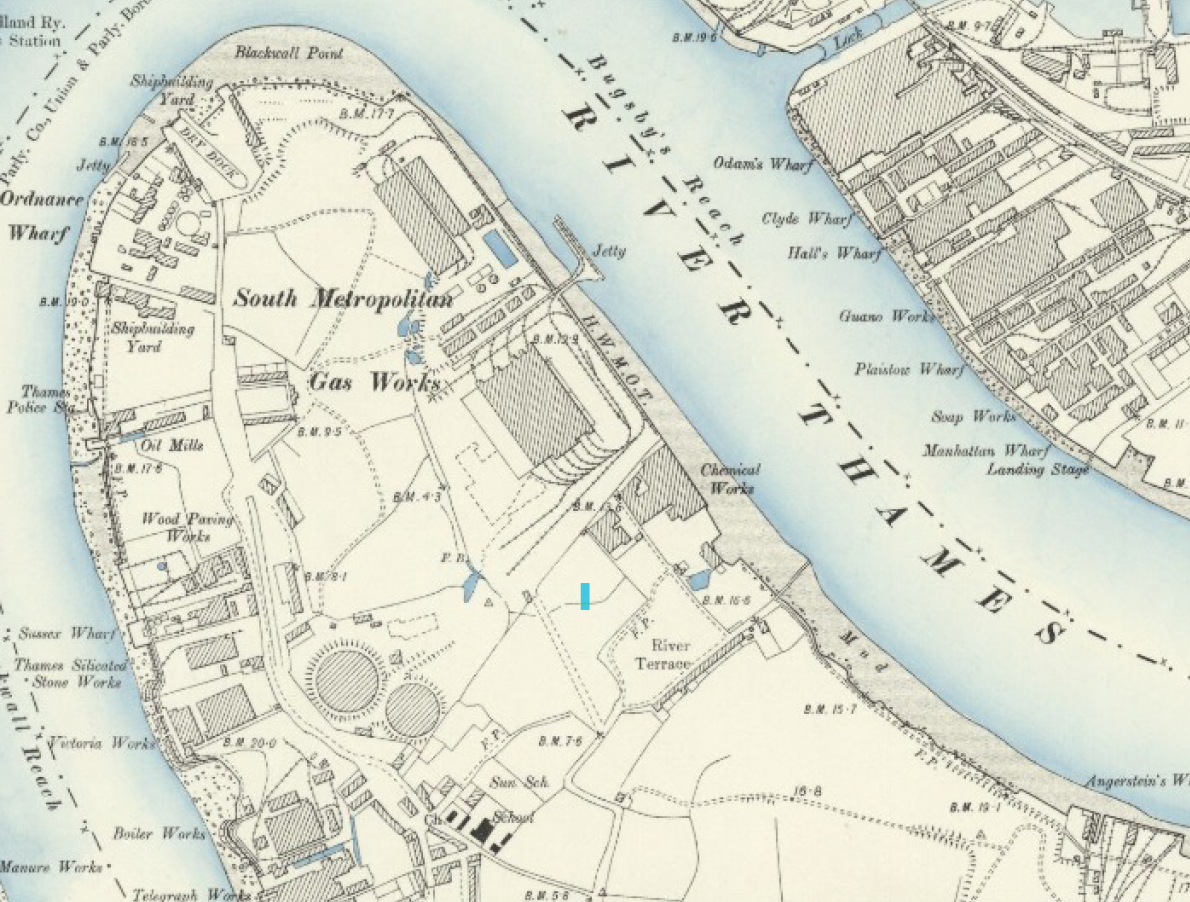
South Metropolitan Gas Works in East Greenwich, from 1894 Ordnance Survey map (Reproduced with the permission of the National Library of Scotland)

The works was built under the auspices of the South Metropolitan Gas Company's chairman George Livesey. Before construction could begin many tons of clinker and heavy rubbish were dumped in order to build up the marshy ground. The gas works eventually occupied most of the east and centre of the peninsula, stretching for around 2 kilometres (1.2 miles) from Blackwall Point, southeast towards New Charlton and covering some 240 acres (0.97 km^{2}). The works took over the chemical works of Frank Hills at Phoenix Wharf on the east side of the peninsula, which already used tar and ammonia from existing gas works.

In 1889 (during a time of labour unrest including the 1889 dock strike) under the leadership of Will Thorne the workforce resigned en masse in an attempt to prevent a profit-sharing scheme with anti-strike clauses. Livesey successfully brought in labour from outside to replace the workforce.

The site had two very large gas holders. The first, built in 1886 and of 8,600,000 cubic feet (240,000 m^{3}) was the world's first 'four lift' (moving section) holder. The second, with six lifts and originally the largest in the world at 12,200,000 cubic feet (350,000 m^{3}), was reduced to 8,900,000 cubic feet (250,000 m^{3}) when it was damaged in the Silvertown explosion in 1917, but was still the largest in England until it was damaged again by a Provisional Irish Republican Army bomb in 1978. It was later demolished. An extensive internal railway system carried coal from a large coaling pier to the rest of the plant.

In the 1920s the Government Fuel Research Station next to the works (on land owned by the company) began research into coal liquefaction in order to make petroleum. It also performed surveys of the properties of coal, and is believed to have carried out chemical weapons research. This closed in 1958, its work transferred to the Warren Spring Laboratory.

Following nationalisation of the gas industry in 1949 the plant was taken over by the South Eastern Gas Board, later passing to British Gas plc.

In the early 1960s oil gasification plant was introduced, greatly increasing capacity. In 1965 the site produced around 400,000,000 cubic feet (11,000,000 m^{3}) of gas, the largest in the world for a single site. After introduction of North Sea gas production ceased in 1976. The gasification plant was mothballed for many years, but eventually demolished.

A striking pre-cast concrete shed at Phoenix Wharf for storage of ammonium sulphate with a parabolic roof was used as a site for film shoots in the 1990s. It was demolished on the pretext that illegal rave parties were held there. It was also used frequently in the detective series Dempsey and Makepeace.

== Decontamination and redevelopment ==
Initial decontamination was carried out by BAM Nuttall for British Gas, with the development being known as Port Greenwich. This included excavation to 15 metres (49 ft) to remove tar from the aquifer and driving a 100 metres (330 ft) diameter sheet pile ring into the London Clay. Around 120 tons of benzene and other hydrocarbons was removed from the soil. Further decontamination was performed by English Partnerships.

Redevelopment began in the early 1990s with the construction of North Greenwich tube station as part of the Jubilee Line Extension. The future station led the site to be chosen for the site of the Millennium Dome, originally intended to be a temporary structure to be removed after 2000 – now The O2 Arena.

The site is covered by many developments, principally The O2, North Greenwich Underground station, a retail park and multiplex cinema, a hotel, primary school, Greenwich Peninsula Ecology Park and Greenwich Millennium Village. Several sites remain to be developed. Two small sections of the plant's coaling jetty are preserved as part of North Greenwich Pier, one acting as the base for Anthony Gormley's sculpture Quantum Cloud.

== Deconstruction ==
In July 2019 deconstruction began on the last East Greenwich Gas Works gasholder. From February 2020 until present, the deconstruction of the outer framework is taking place.

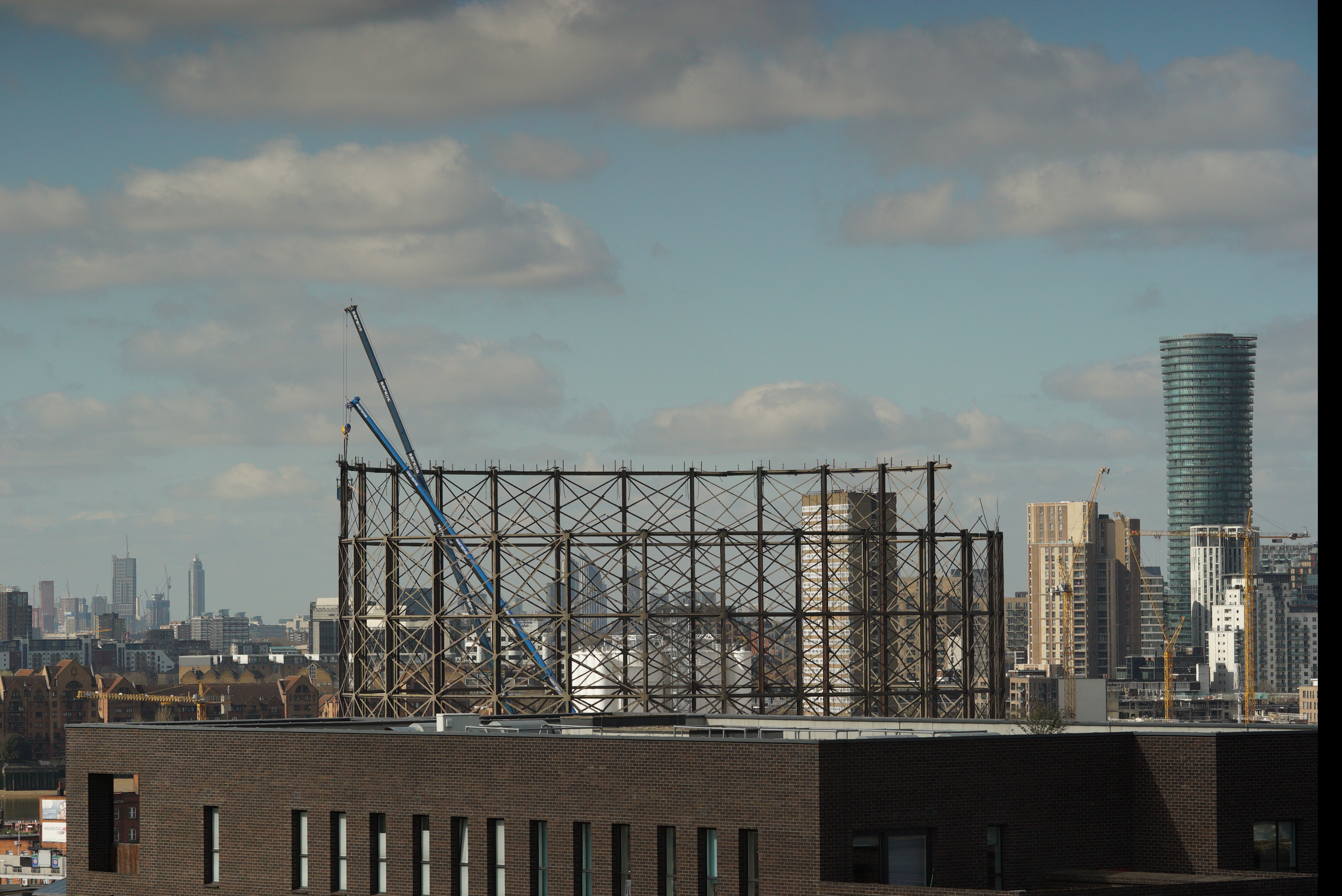
Greenwich Gas Works Mid Deconstruction – 16 March 2020

== See also ==
- Beckton Gas Works
- Southall Gas Works
- Imperial Gas Works, Fulham
- Nine Elms Gas Works
