= Greenwich Peninsula =

Coordinates: 51.498°N 0.004°E

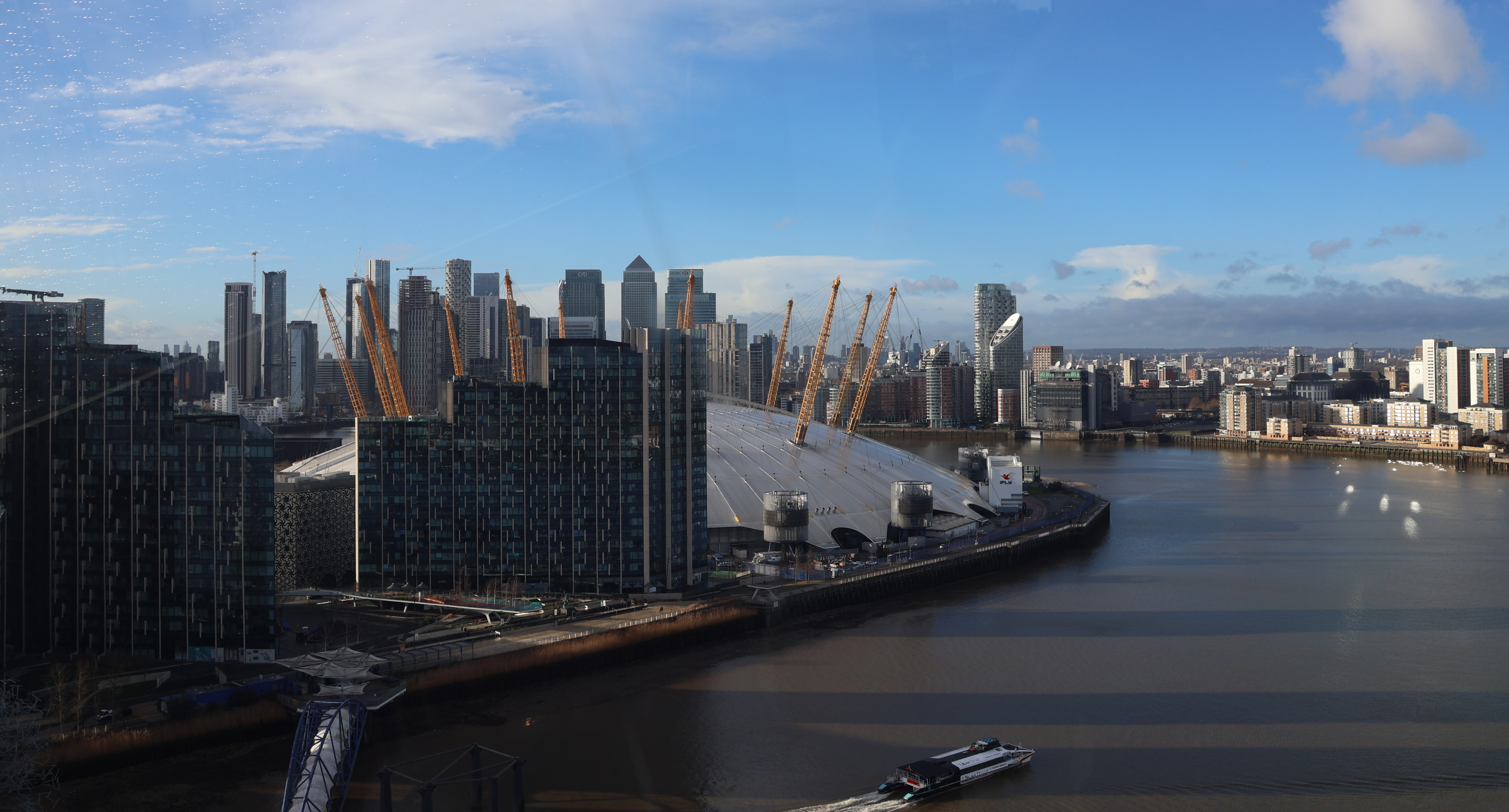
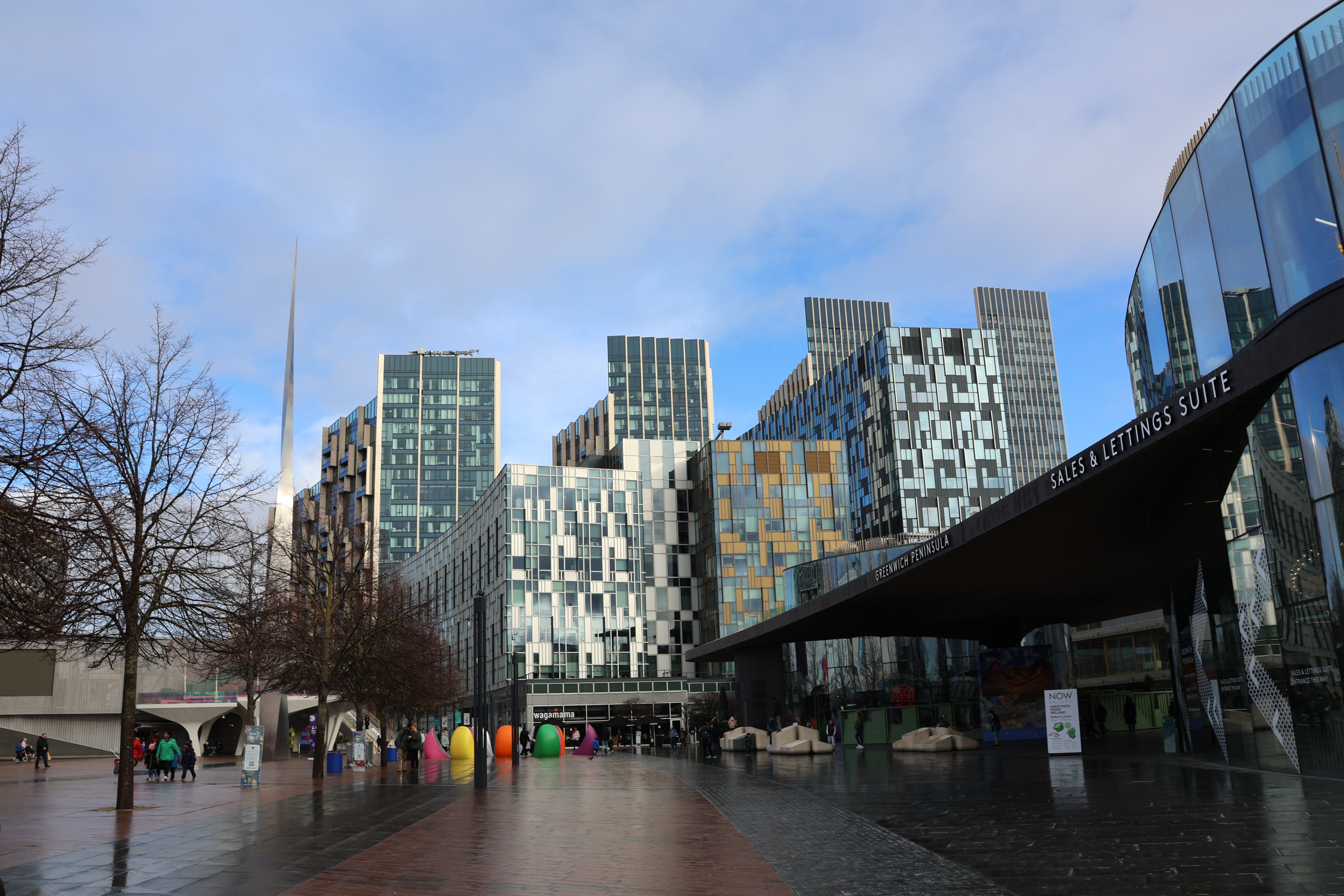
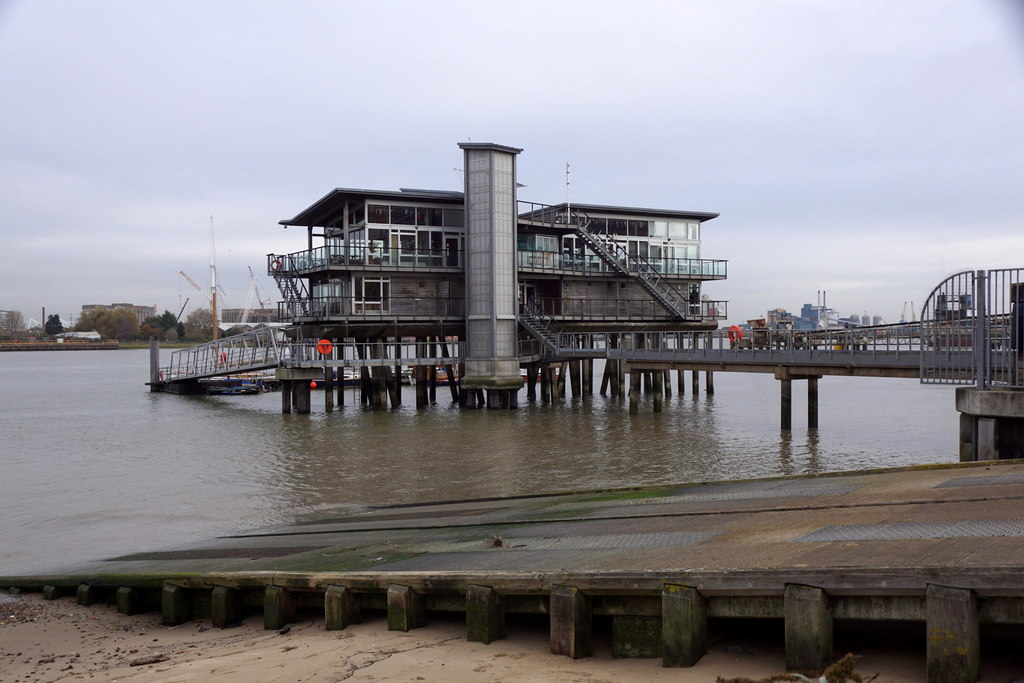
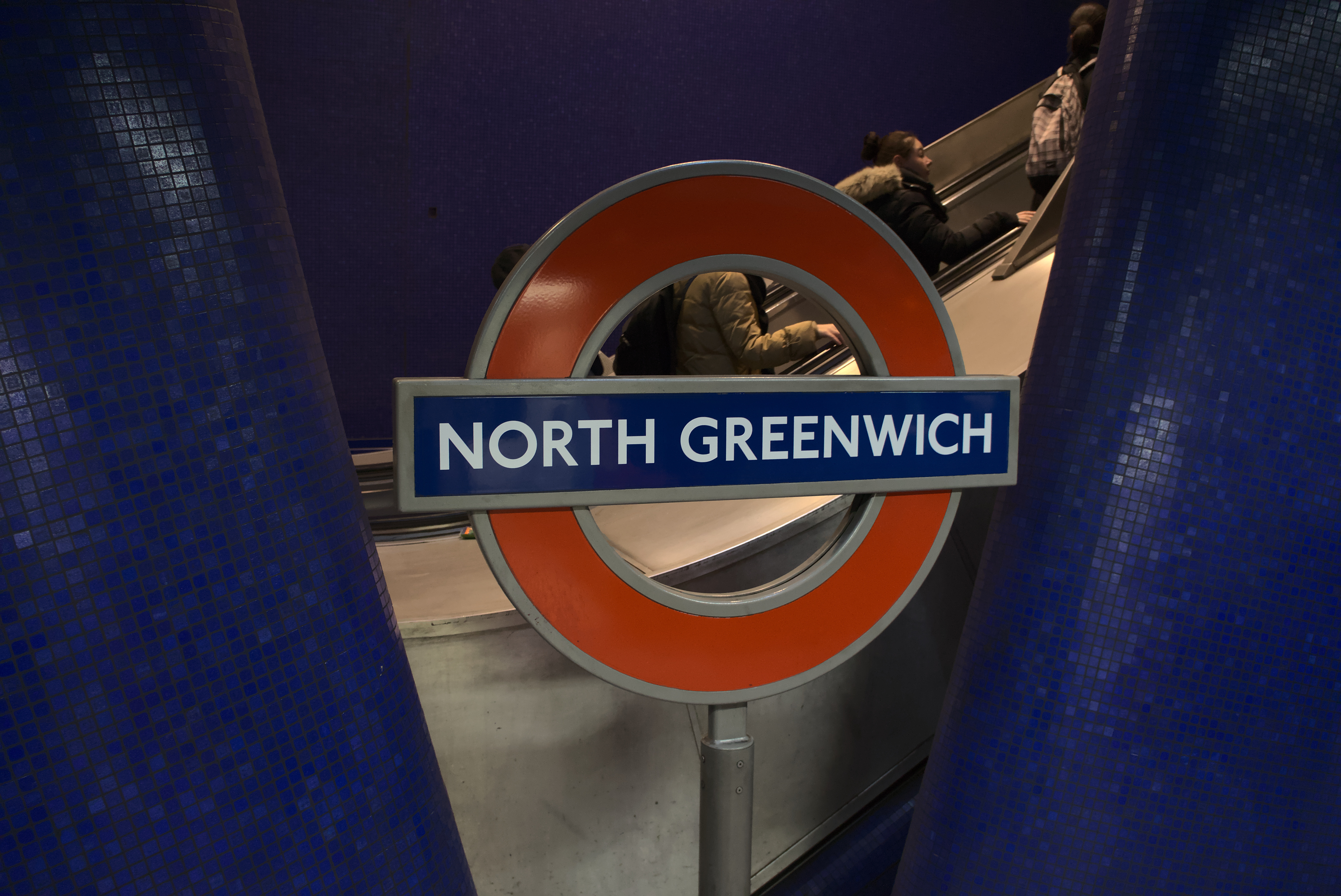
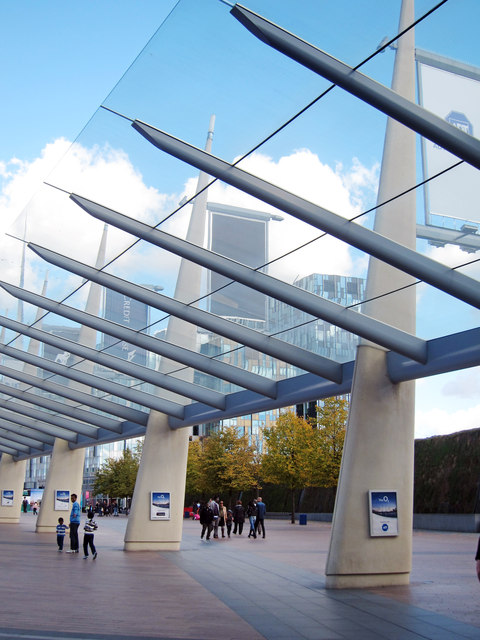
- The O2 seen from the London Cable Car Peninsula Square Greenwich Yacht Club North Greenwich station Canopy

- Location within Greater London
- OS grid reference: TQ392796
- London borough: Greenwich
- Ceremonial county: Greater London
- Region: London
- Country: England
- Sovereign state: United Kingdom
- Post town: London
- Postcode district: SE10 0
- Dialling code: 020
- Police: Metropolitan
- Fire: London
- Ambulance: London
- UK Parliament: Greenwich and Woolwich
- London Assembly: Greenwich and Lewisham
- Website: www.greenwichpeninsula.co.uk

The Greenwich Peninsula, also known as North Greenwich, is an area of Greenwich in South East London, England. It is bounded on three sides by a loop of the Thames, between the Isle of Dogs to the west and Silvertown to the east. To the south is the rest of Greenwich, and to the south-east is Charlton.

Formerly known as Greenwich Marshes and as Bugsby's Marshes, the area became known as East Greenwich as it developed in the 19th century, but more recently has been called North Greenwich due to the location of North Greenwich Underground station (not to be confused with North Greenwich on the Isle of Dogs, at the north side of a former ferry from Greenwich).

Landmarks include The Dome (also known by the current corporate logo The O_{2} and previously as the Millennium Dome), the southern end of the Blackwall Tunnel and the western end of the Silvertown Tunnel. The area is now being substantially redeveloped with new homes, offices, schools and parks. Ravensbourne University London, a media and design university built on the peninsula in 2010, neighbours The O_{2}.

== History ==
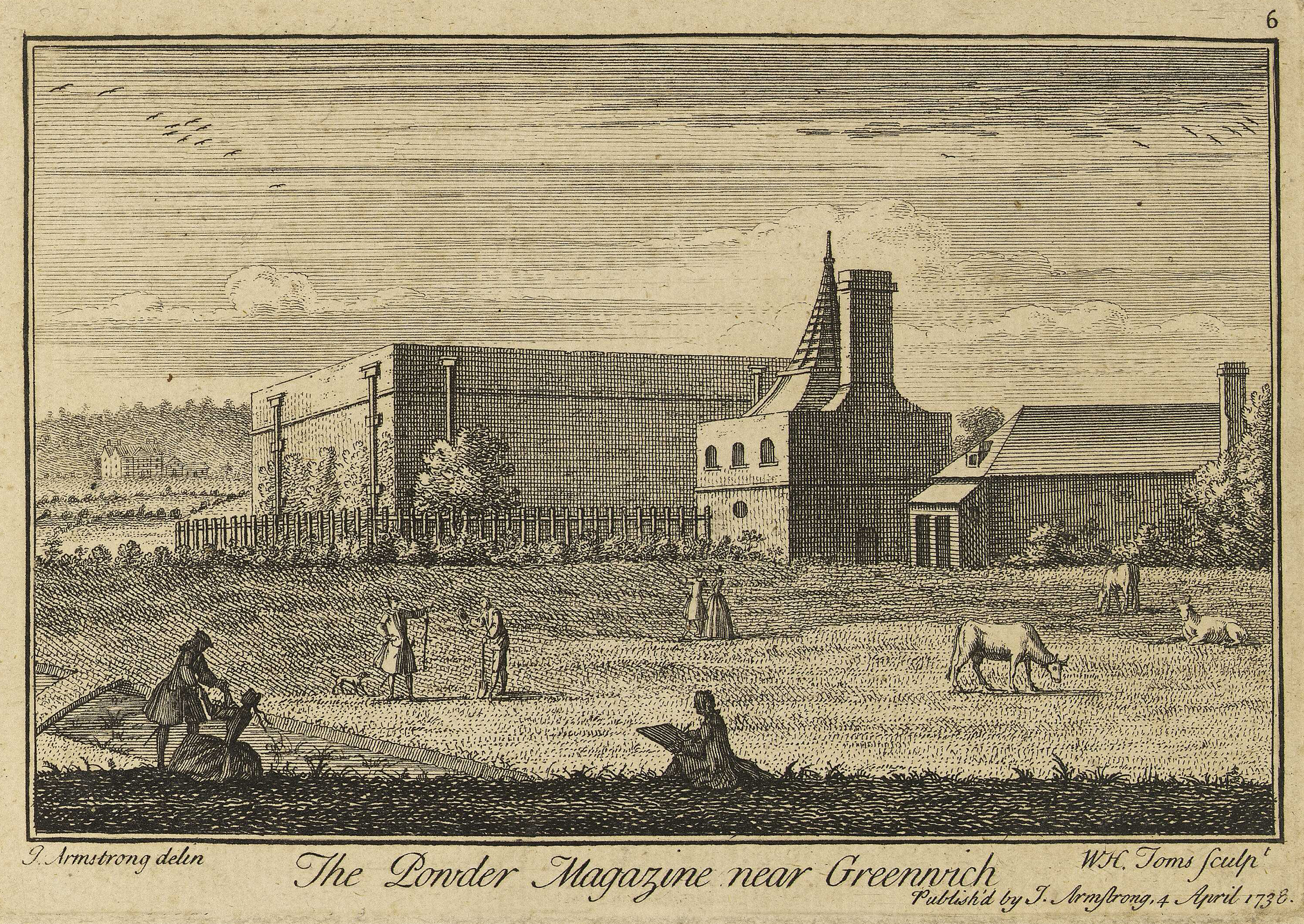
Greenwich Powder Magazine (as it appeared in 1738)

The peninsula was drained by Dutch engineers in the 16th century, allowing it to be used as pasture land. In the 17th century, Blackwall Point (the northern tip of the peninsula, opposite Blackwall) gained notoriety as a location where pirates' corpses were hung in cages as a deterrent to other would-be pirates. In the 1690s, the Board of Ordnance established a gunpowder magazine on the west side of the peninsula, which was in operation by 1695, serving as the government's primary magazine (where newly milled powder was stored before it was sent out, on board specially equipped hoys). Alongside the magazine were a wharf, a proof house and accommodation for the resident Storekeeper. From the early 18th century, however, local residents began petitioning Parliament for the magazine (and its dangerous contents in particular) to be removed; this eventually led to the establishment of a new set of Royal Gunpowder Magazines down river at Purfleet, which was opened in 1765. By 1771, gunpowder was no longer stored at Greenwich, though the buildings remained in situ for some decades afterwards.

The peninsula was steadily industrialised from the early 19th century onwards. In 1857 a plan was presented to Parliament for a huge dock occupying much of the peninsula, connected to Greenwich Reach to the west and Bugsby's Reach to the east, but this came to nothing. Early industries included Henry Blakeley's Ordnance Works making heavy guns, with other sites making chemicals, submarine cables, iron boats, iron and steel. Henry Bessemer built a steel works in the early 1860s to supply the London shipbuilding industry, but this closed as a result of a fall in demand due to the financial crisis of 1866. Later came oil mills, shipbuilding (for example the 1870 clippers Blackadder and Hallowe'en built by Maudslay), boiler making, manufacture of Portland cement and linoleum (Bessemer's works became the Victoria linoleum works) and the South Metropolitan Gas company's huge East Greenwich Gas Works. Early in the 20th century came bronze manufacturers Delta Metals and works making asbestos and 'Molassine Meal' animal feed.

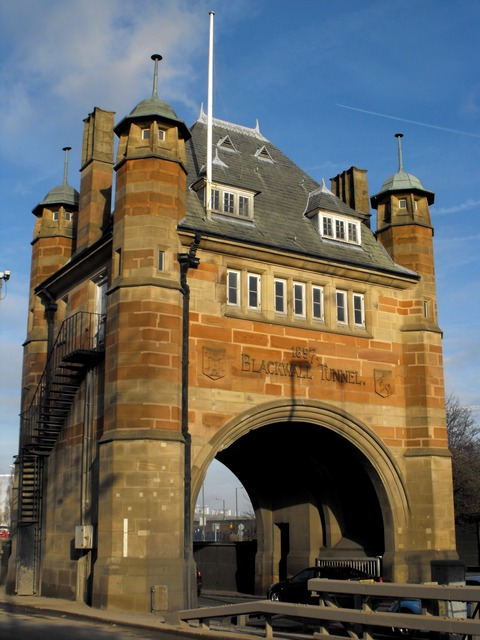
Blackwall Tunnel southern gateway house

The Blackwall Tunnel was originally opened as a single bore in 1897 by the Prince of Wales as a major transport project to improve commerce and trade in London's East End. Two entrance gateways were built north and south of the tunnel; a peninsula landmark and a listed building, only the southern entrance gateway, also known as Southern Tunnel House, remains. Designed by LCC architect Thomas Blashill in an Art Nouveau style, using light-brown sandstone with contrasting bands of red sandstone, it was built just before the tunnel was completed, and is rectangular in plan, with octagonal turrets on each corner. Intended to provide basic living accommodation for the superintendent and caretaker of the tunnel, each had two bedrooms, a living-room, scullery, larder and a toilet on the level over the archway. The roofspace included a third bedroom and a cistern room.

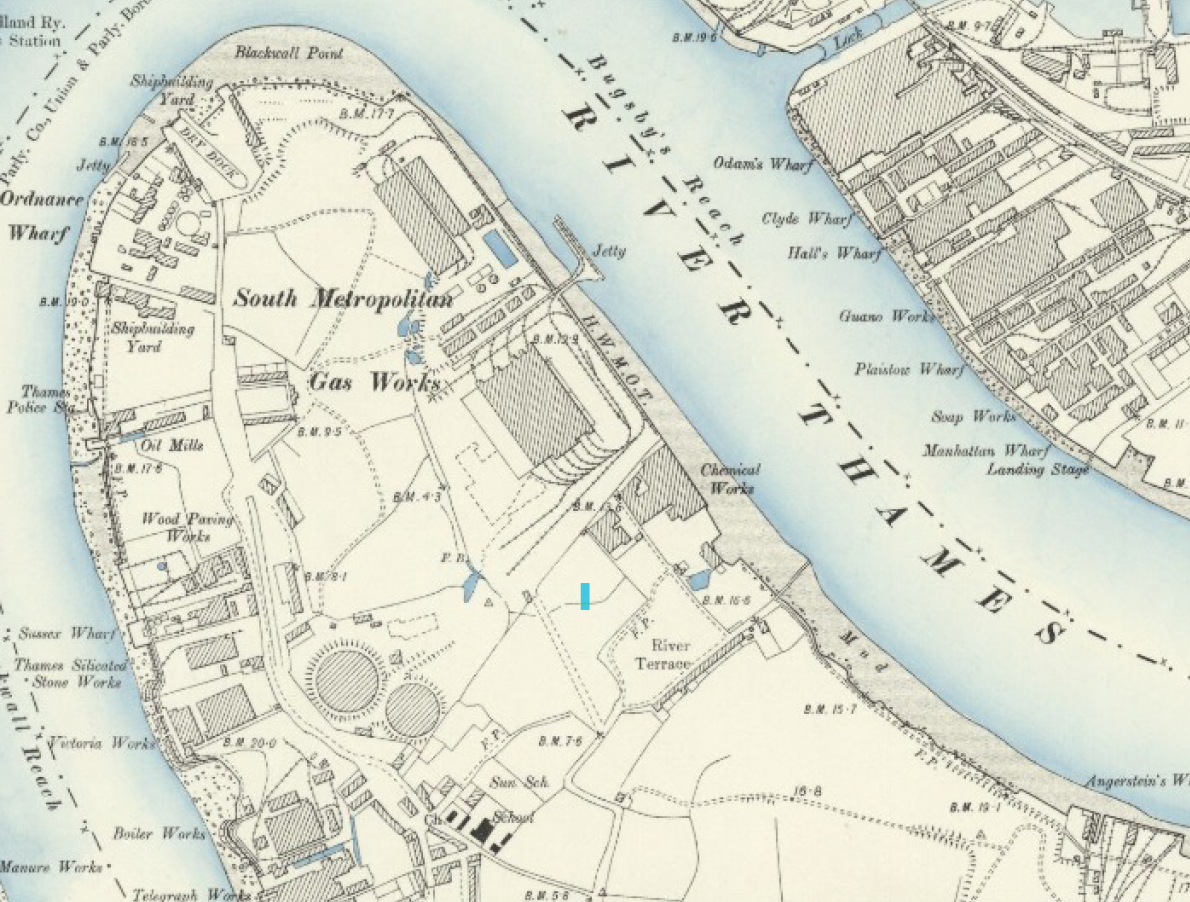
Map showing extent of South Metropolitan Gas Works in East Greenwich (from 1894 Ordnance Survey map - Reproduced with the permission of the National Library of Scotland)

For over 100 years, the peninsula was dominated by the gasworks which primarily produced town gas, also known as coal gas. The gasworks grew to 240 acres (0.97 km^{2}), the largest in Europe, also producing coke, tar and chemicals as important secondary products. The site had its own extensive railway system and a large jetty used to unload coal and load coke. There were two huge gas holders, of 8.6 and 12.2 million ft^{3} (240,000 m^{3} and 345,000 m^{3}). The larger holder, originally the largest in the world, was reduced to 8.9 million ft^{3} (250,000 m^{3}) when it was damaged in the Silvertown explosion in 1917, but was still the largest in England until it was damaged again by a Provisional Irish Republican Army bomb in 1978. Originally manufacturing gas from coal, the plant began to manufacture gas from oil in the 1960s. Its peak production of 400 million ft^{3} per day (11.3 million m^{3}) in the mid 1960s is believed to have been the largest of any single site in the world. The discovery of natural gas reserves in the North Sea soon rendered the complex obsolete.

The peninsula's northernmost point on the riverside is known as Blackwall Point, and this may have led to the name Blackwall Peninsula sometimes being used in the late 20th century. On the eastern shore was Blackwall Point Power Station; the original station from the 1890s was replaced in the 1950s by a new station which ceased operation in about 1981. On the western shore, a large area including the site of the Victoria linoleum works later became the Victoria Deep Water Terminal in 1966, handling container traffic.

A map showing the Marsh ward of Greenwich Metropolitan Borough as it appeared in 1916

At the southwestern end of the peninsula, Enderby's Wharf was occupied by a succession of famous submarine cable companies from 1857 onwards, including Glass Elliot, W T Henley, Telcon, Submarine Cables Ltd, STC, Nortel and Alcatel Submarine Networks.

The peninsula remained relatively remote from central London until the opening of the Blackwall Tunnel in 1897, and had no passenger railway or London Underground service until the opening of North Greenwich tube station on the Jubilee line in 1999.

Closure of the gasworks, power station and other industries in the late 20th century left much of the Greenwich Peninsula a barren wasteland, much of it heavily contaminated. In the early years of the 21st century, surviving industries were mainly concentrated on the western side of the peninsula, between the river and the A102 Blackwall Tunnel southern approach road. They included Alcatel, a Tunnel Refiners/Amylum glucose plant (from 1976 until about 2008 part of Tate & Lyle) which closed in 2009, and two large marine aggregate terminals on the Delta Metals and Victoria Deep Water Terminal sites. The second of the two gasholders was demolished in 2020.

=== Redevelopment since the 1990s ===
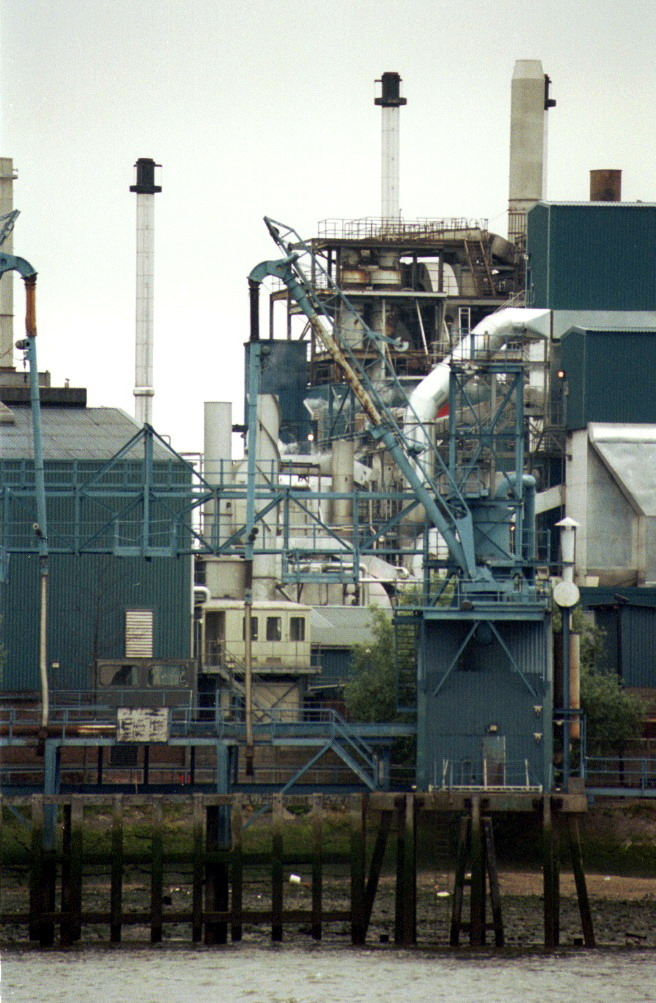
The west side of the peninsula from the Thames in 2001: part of the glucose works

Public and private investment since the early 1990s has brought about some dramatic changes in the peninsula's topography. In 1997 the national regeneration agency English Partnerships (later renamed the Homes and Communities Agency, now Homes England) purchased 1.21 square kilometres (300 acres) of disused land on the peninsula. The agency's investment of over £225m has helped to enhance the transport network and create new homes, commercial space and community facilities and to open up access to parkland along the river.

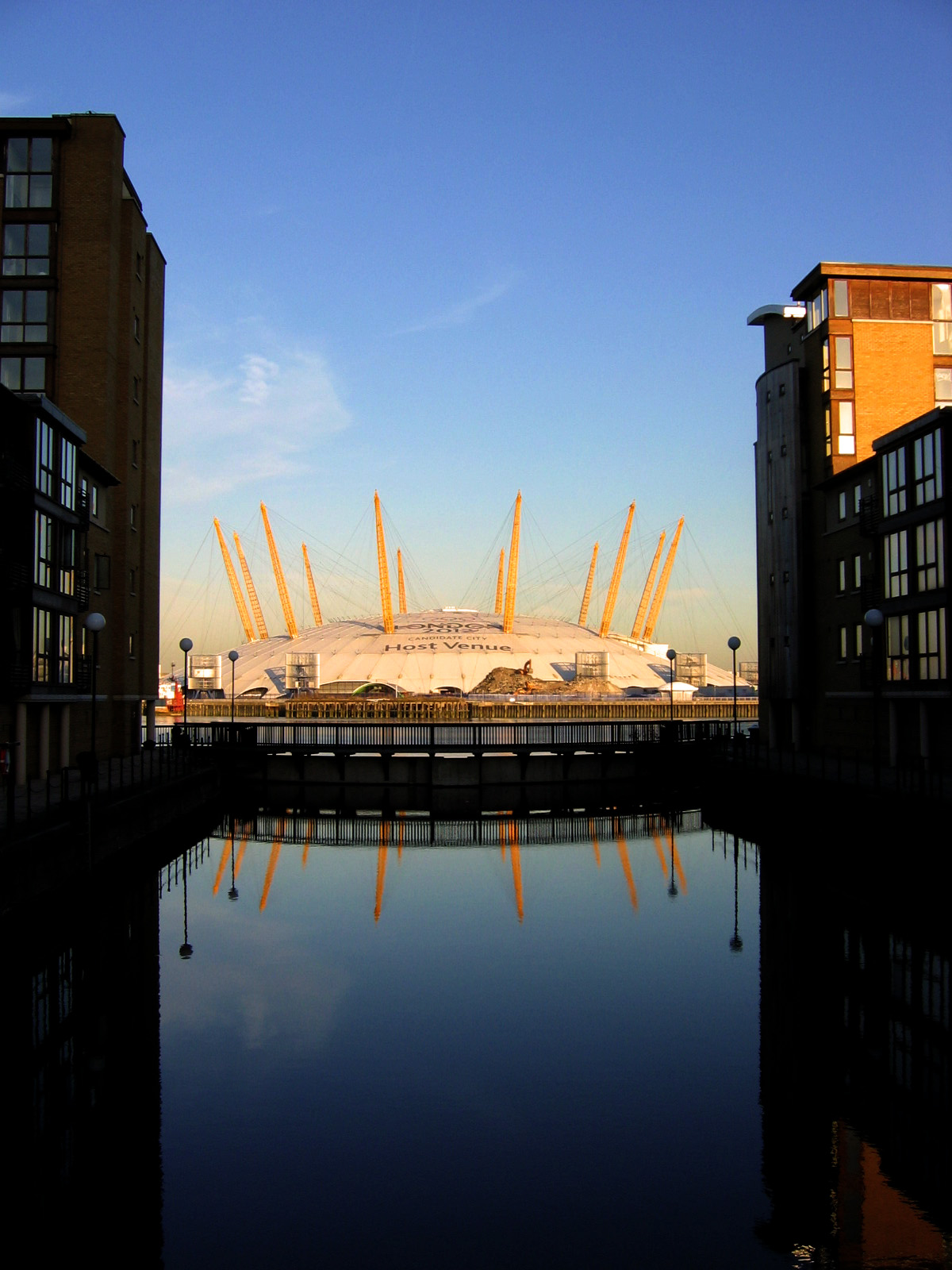
The O_{2}, the 2nd largest single-roofed structure in the world after the Philippine Arena

In addition to the construction of the Millennium Dome, new roads were built on the eastern side of the peninsula in anticipation of new developments. New riverside walkways, cycle paths and public artworks were also created, including Antony Gormley's Quantum Cloud and Richard Wilson's A Slice of Reality. (In 2015, these were among five North Greenwich artworks incorporated into The Line, a public sculpture trail spanning the River Thames.)

Two phases of Greenwich Millennium Village, a mixed-tenure residential development designed by architect Ralph Erskine, with a primary school, a medical centre, a nature reserve with associated education centre have been completed. A Holiday Inn hotel was also built nearby, and the Greenwich Yacht Club was relocated to a new site south-east of the Dome.

North Greenwich tube station on the Jubilee line opened in 1999. It is one of the largest London Underground stations and also has a bus station. The North Greenwich Pier offering commuter boat services to other parts of London, both east and west, is located on the Thames on the east side of the peninsula.

In 2004 outline planning permission was granted for further large-scale redevelopment of the site, including over 10,000 further homes, some facing the river or overlooking the park, 3,500,000 square feet (330,000 m^{2}) of office space and the conversion of the Millennium Dome into an indoor arena, renamed The O_{2}, which was used as a London 2012 venue. South of The O_{2}, new public realms were created, Peninsula Square and Green Place. To the east of Peninsula Square is Ravensbourne University London, which relocated to Greenwich Peninsula in September 2010. In 2011, the university's campus won an award in the Royal Institute of British Architects (RIBA) Awards for London. From a shortlist of 55 schemes, the Ravensbourne building won the education and community category.

To the south east of the square, the six storey 14 Pier Walk building houses offices for Transport for London. Adjacent to this is the 11 storey 6 Mitre Passage office building. New restaurants and shops have opened facing onto Peninsula Square and Green Place.

Transport for London constructed a cable car over the River Thames just before the 2012 Summer Olympics began. This runs from a riverside station south-east of the O_{2} over the river to the Royal Victoria Dock west of the ExCeL Centre.

From 2005 to 2014, adjacent to the cable car terminus, a large temporary building housed the London Soccer Dome, formerly the David Beckham Academy. This was dismantled and transported to Southend for re-erection, though the structures were ultimately not reused. The site is intended for residential use.

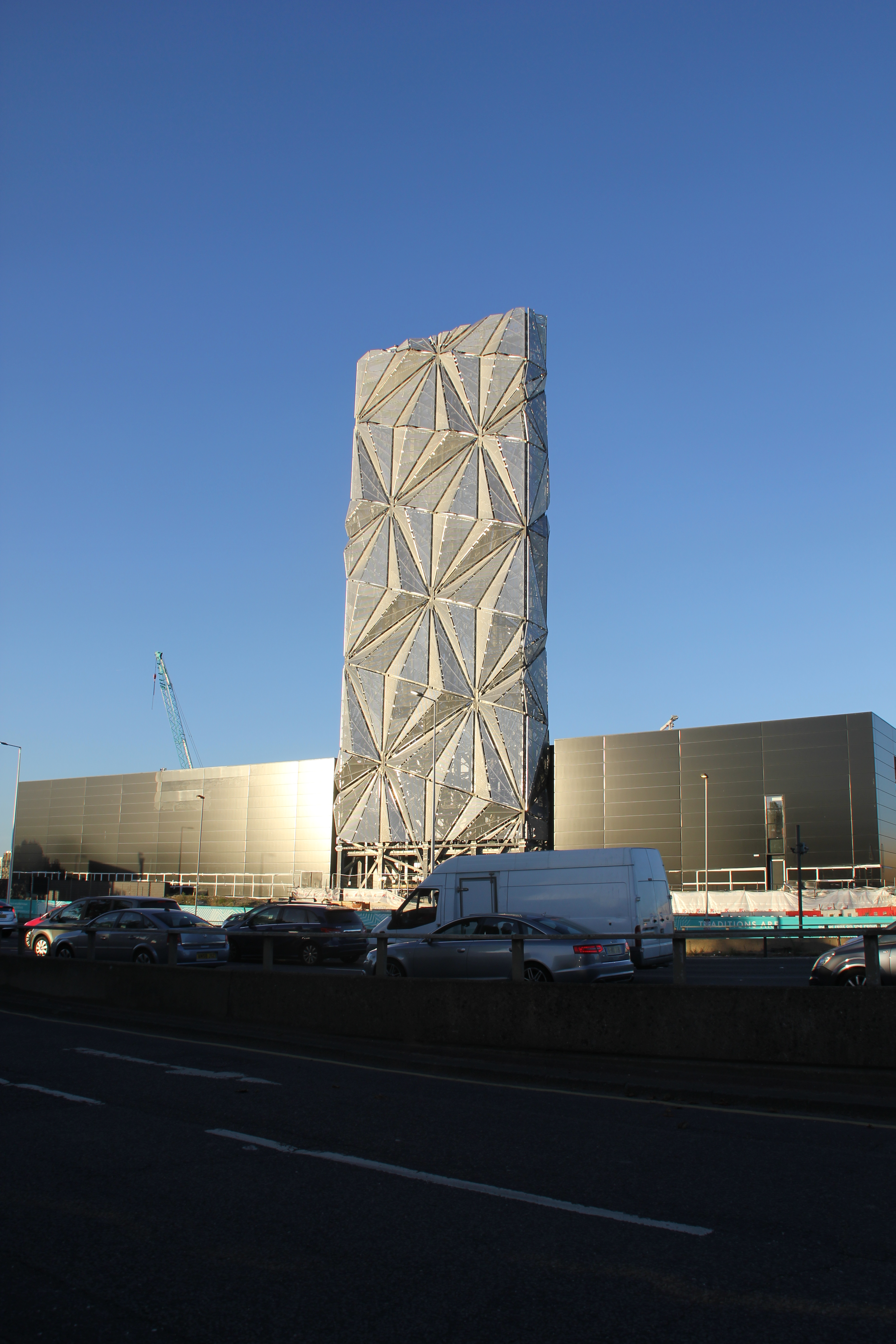
Greenwich combined heat and power (CHP) energy centre

Central Park runs through the central spine of the peninsula, with the Greenwich Peninsula Ecology Park further south providing a haven for many different species of bird, plants and insects.

A combined heat and power (CHP) energy centre has been constructed adjacent to and east of the A102 Blackwall Tunnel Southern Approach to provide district heating to an eventual total of 15,700 properties on the peninsula. It is operated by Pinnacle Power for Greenwich Peninsula ESCO Limited. A 49 m high tower forms part of the energy centre, designed by C. F. Møller Architects, and was completed in 2016. The tower is clad in a complex metal cladding formed of hundreds of triangular patterns (initially titled 'Lenticular Dazzle Camouflage'), designed by British artist Conrad Shawcross. The tower cladding later featured as part of an art trail around north Greenwich, with the work given the title 'The Optic Cloak'.

In 2016, construction started on new buildings for St Mary Magdalene Church of England School (part of the Koinonia Federation; the federation then operated at four Greenwich sites, two of which moved to the new building on completion in September 2018). The school is located at the corner of Millennium Way and John Harrison Way, and has sports facilities available for community use.

Several high-rise residential developments were constructed at Riverside Peninsula (east of the O_{2}), and between Central Park and Olympian Way (the riverside path on the east side of the peninsula), followed by developments west of Central Park, adjacent to St Mary Magdalene School. In 2026, plans were lodged for a pair of high-rise towers giving student accommodation, co-living homes and affordable housing, located beside the Silvertown Tunnel. Nearby, plans were also submitted for a 29-storey tower scheme containing more than 1,300 homes on the former gasholder site.

In November 2023, Galliard Homes, in a joint venture with Singaporean partner City Developments Limited, acquired the 13.8-acre Morden Wharf development on the west side of the peninsula. Planning permission was granted in April 2026 for a 1,500-home residential scheme, including 20% affordable housing, in 11 blocks with the tallest being 35 storeys high, and 186,300 sq ft of commercial floorspace, car and cycle parking, public realm and open space.

== Future development ==
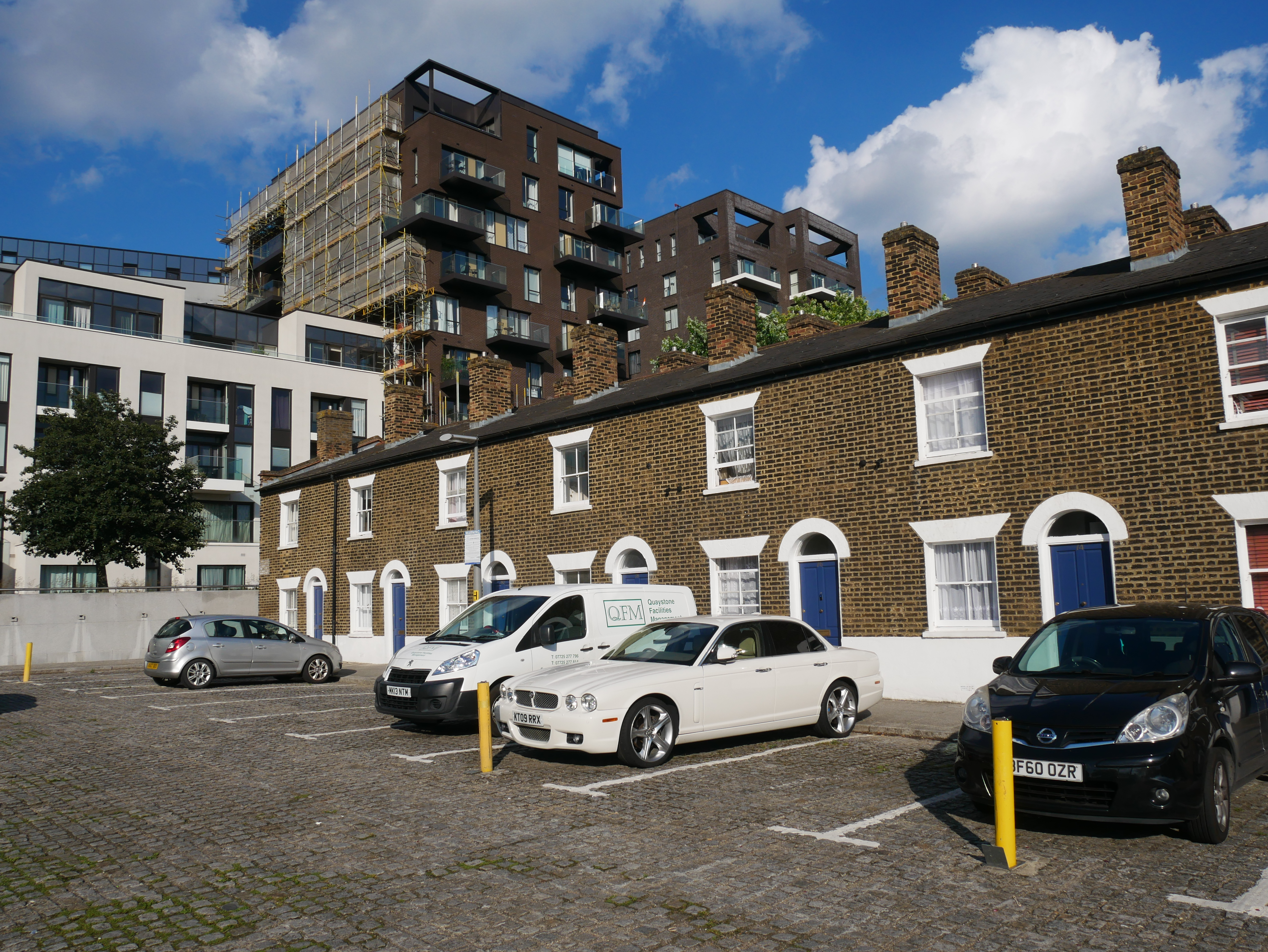
70-84 River Way, a row of early 19th-century terraced houses on Greenwich Peninsula, now Grade II listed

The redevelopment of Greenwich Peninsula was planned in 2015 to take around 20 years. The improved access to the peninsula from Canary Wharf, the City and the West End via the Jubilee line has increased the prospects for continued residential regeneration.

A few historic buildings remain protected from future development, among them the Pilot Inn, a public house built in the early 19th century to serve coal workers and their families. At the western end of River Way, the pub and its associated grade II listed cottages are among the oldest remaining buildings on the peninsula.

== See also ==
- List of peninsulas
