= Farmer and Dark =

British architectural firm

Farmer and Dark was an architectural practice known for public sector works in post-war Britain. They designed several power stations for the Central Electricity Generating Board during this period.

The practice was established in the 1930s by Frank Quentery Farmer and Bernard Frankland Dark.

== Selected works ==
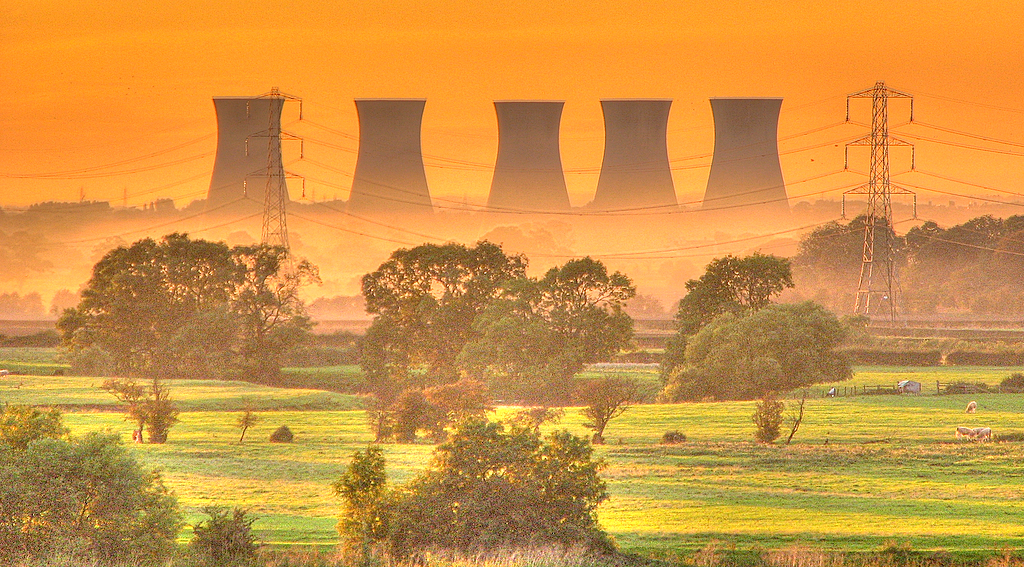
Willington Power Station at Sunset

- Willington Power Station
- Marchwood Power Station
- Belvedere Power Station
- Queen Elizabeth II Law Courts, Liverpool
- Bowater factory, Gillingham
- Loewy offices, Poole
- Fanum House, Basingstoke
- Glenmere Community Primary School in Wigston was built in 1964 and listed at Grade II in 2025.
