= Belvedere Power Station =

Former power station in south east London, England

- Country: England
- Location: Greater London
- Coordinates: 51.504406°N 0.159355°E
- Status: Decommissioned and demolished
- Construction began: 1954
- Commission date: 1960
- Decommission date: 1986
- Owners: British Electricity Authority (1954–1955); Central Electricity Authority (1955–1957); Central Electricity Generating Board (1958–1986)
- Operator: As owner
- Employees: 300

Thermal power station
- Primary fuel: Oil-fired
- Chimneys: 2 (128 metres)
- Cooling towers: None
- Cooling source: River water

Power generation
- Units operational: 4 × 60 MW, 2 × 120 MW
- Make and model: John Brown Land Boilers Ltd. English Electric Co turbo-alternators
- Units decommissioned: All
- Nameplate capacity: 480 MW
- Annual net output: (See graph below)

Belvedere Power Station was an oil-fired 480 MW power station on the river Thames at Belvedere, south-east London. It was commissioned in 1960 and operated for 26 years. It was decommissioned in 1986 and was subsequently demolished in 1993–1994. The site has been redeveloped as industrial warehouses, although the fuelling jetty is extant.

== History ==
Belvedere power station was developed by the British Electricity Authority and subsequently by the Central Electricity Authority (1955–57) and from 1958 by the Central Electricity Generating Board. It was constructed between 1954 and 1960 on a riverside site originally acquired by the West Kent Electric Company in 1919. The site was opposite the Ford plant at Dagenham. Construction was initially undertaken by the Construction Department of the BEA's London Division, then by the Southern Project Group of the CEGB. Mowlems were the building contractors.

The architectural design was by Farmer and Dark. The main building was a steel framed structure with the turbine hall to the west and the taller boiler house to the east and the control room in the centre of the block. The walls were clad in corrugated aluminium. The turbine hall was lit by skylights. Two 128-metre-tall (420 ft) precast concrete chimneys were located to the east of the boiler house. Three 14,000 tonne oil tanks were located to the south-east of the site.

The first half of the station, commissioned in 1960, comprised four low-pressure boilers (John Brown Land Boilers Ltd.) each with a capacity of 550,000 lb/hr (69.3 kg/s) producing steam at 950 psi and 925 °F (65.5 bar and 496 °C) and four 60 MW turbo-alternators (English Electric Co Ltd). It was originally planned to contain afurtehr four 60MW units but advances in technology meant that the second half of the station, commissioned in 1961–2, was equipped with two high pressure boilers rated at 1,600,000 lb/hr (201.6 kg/s) producing steam at 1600 psi and 1010/1005 °F (110 kg/s and 543/541 °C) and two high-pressure 120 MW units, also by John Brown. The station therefore had a total generating capacity of 480 MW.

Cooling water was abstracted from, and returned to, the tidal river Thames. Seven pumps circulated water at a rate of 21 million gallons per hour (26.5 m^{3}/sec). Oil was shipped from Shell Haven refinery further down the river, and was delivered to a 192-metre-long (630 ft) jetty on the river.

From 1970 to 1973 the 120 MW units at Belvedere were amongst the CEGB's 20 stations with the highest thermal efficiencies. The 120 MW units had an average thermal efficiency of 34.13 per cent. Belvedere's overall thermal efficiency in 1971 was 31.67 per cent.

=== Electricity output ===
Electricity was generated at 11.8 kV (60 MW units) and at 13.8 kV (120 MW units).

Electricity output from Belvedere power station over the period 1961–1987 was as follows.

Belvedere annual electricity output GWh

The intensive use of the oil-fired station in 1985 was in the context of the 1984-85 miners' strike.

A line from the nearby 132kV grid station skirted the Crossness Sewage Works to the 132kV Thames Crossing of the CEGB. This was the Belvedere-Barking/Crowlands circuit. It was decommissioned in the mid 1980s.

=== Decommissioning ===
In 1982 two of the 60 MW turbo-alternators were decommissioned, the operational capacity then became 2 × 60 MW and 2 × 120 MW. Belvedere power station was decommissioned in 1986 and was subsequently demolished in 1993–4.

A new generating station, the Belvedere Incinerator has recently been built to the west of the site.

=== Incidents ===
In 1955 it was reported that four men had been overcome with fumes at the bottom of a 40 ft. manhole at Belvedere power station. Three members of the Kent fire brigade received the British Empire Medal for saving them.

In 1959 a radioactive iridium isotope went missing from a lorry which was travelling from Belvedere power station to Derby. The following day it was found in West London.
