= Greenwich Peninsula Ecology Park =

Park in South London, England

- Interactive map of Greenwich Peninsula Ecology Park
- Type: Ecology park
- Location: Thames Path, John Harrison Way, Greenwich Peninsula
- Coordinates: 51.4949°N 0.0163°E
- Area: South London, UK
- Operator: TCV
- Status: Open: Wednesday - Sunday 10:00 - 5:00

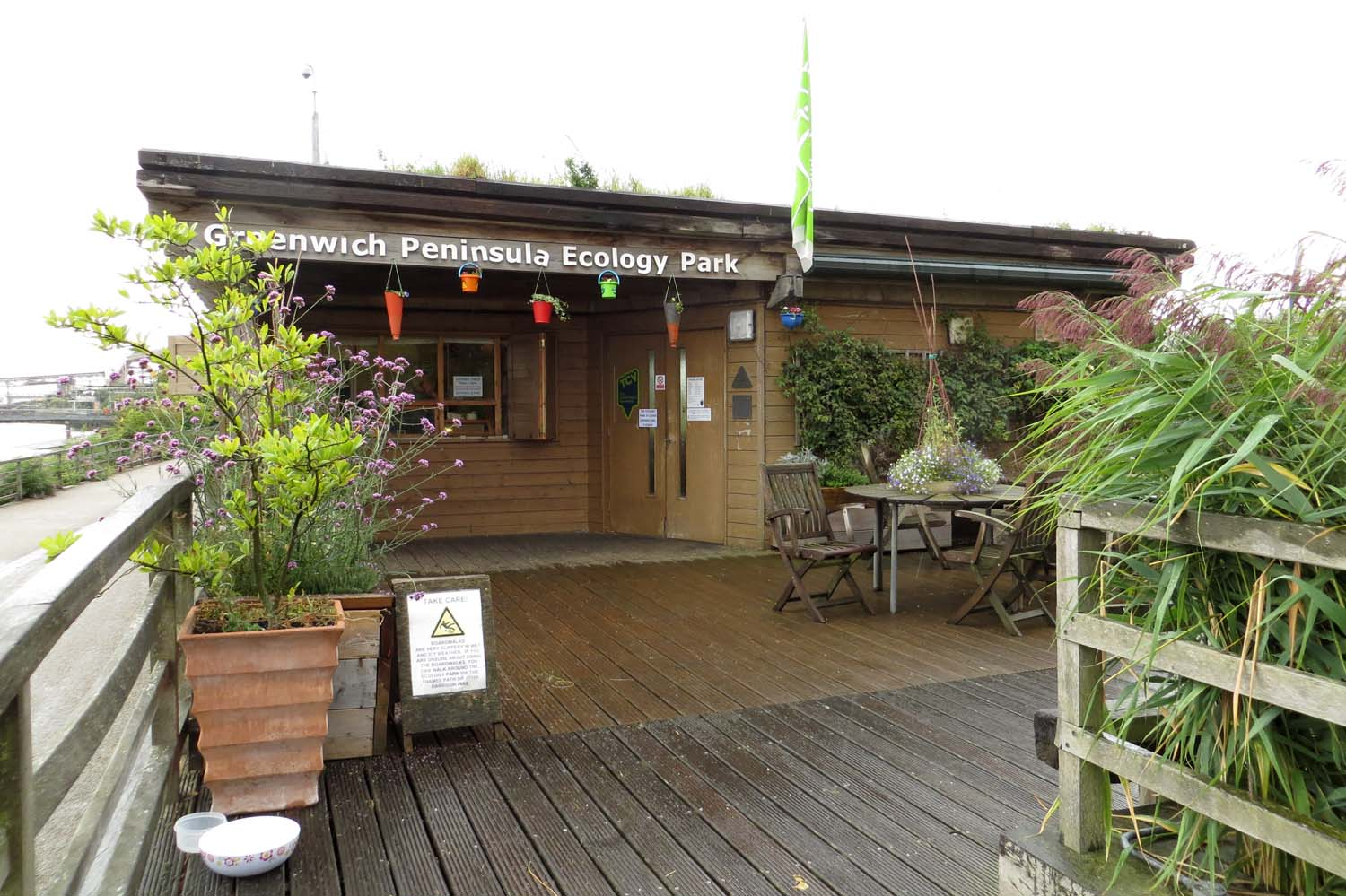
Entrance to the Greenwich Peninsula Ecology Park

The Greenwich Peninsula Ecology Park is a park situated along the River Thames in the Greenwich Peninsula in South London. The park reflects the nature of the original marshland on the peninsula. The park provides a haven for many different species of bird, plants and bugs and acts as an important brownfield land to control urban sprawl. The park is a partnership project of Homes and Communities Agency (HCA) and now managed by The Conservation Volunteers (TCV). The area of the park is 11 hectares and is half aquatic and half terrestrial. Development was completed in 2000 and the park opened to public in 2002. In April 2011 the Trust took on the management of a new site nearby, the Meantime Nursery, with aims to create on vacant development land a resource for the community and for nature conservation. The park is a Site of Borough Importance for Nature Conservation, Grade I.

The Greenwich Peninsula Ecology Park contains multiple man-made, fresh water habitats within a small area, resulting in high biodiversity and the presence of amphibians, fish, and insects. Two lakes, marshland, shingle beach, alder carr, shallow pools, willow beds and meadow are contained within the park. The two lakes are pumped water from a chalk borehole deep underground to ensure the water quality is suitable for wildlife. Water level is controlled carefully to mimic natural seasonal variations, so that water levels are low in summer and high in winter. The lakes are surrounded by marshes where reeds grow, providing shelter and food for birds, including grebes and warblers. The shingle beach has sandy soil and rocks for dragonflies to breed and butterflies to bask. The carr is a waterlogged woodland dominated by alder, which tolerates submerged roots in wet ground. There is also dead wood in the area, providing habitats for invertebrates. Willow in the park is coppiced on a regular basis and stocked up as mulch to lie on the ground to retain moisture and prevent grass from growing. Shallow pools are found in the willow woodland and are a habitat for frogs and invertebrate. Ephemeral and seasonal pools are found next to the bat tower. When the pool dries up, specialised invertebrates and small crustaceans dominate the habitat. The meadowland is dominated by wildflowers, which provides food to bees and butterflies, the primary producers in the food chain. Several species of moths previously thought to be locally extinct were found in the Ecology Park recently.

== History ==
The Greenwich Peninsula was once a natural wetland. The area became heavily industrialised as part of the London Docklands, with chemical and steel factories and shipyards following industrialisation in the late 1880s. The development of the peninsula resulted in pollution, including unprocessed factory waste, leading to Environmental degradation and the displacement of natural marshland and wetland.

In 1997 because of the increased awareness of environmental protection and the approaching of the Millennium, English Partnerships began an urban renewal program. Greenwich Peninsula Ecology Park, which aimed to remediate the environment and to restore species and habitats loss during industrialisation, was an outgrowth of this program.

== Phytoremediation ==
Phytoremediation was used at Greenwich Peninsula Ecology Park to extract and degrade pollutants. Many willows (genus Salix) of various species and life stages are grown in the park. These deciduous plants are tolerant of toxins and pollutants and are hyperaccumulators, making them well-suited to phytoremediation. Willows can phytoremediate silver, chromium, mercury, lead, selenium, zinc and several other heavy metals and organic contaminants. Toxins and pollutants which exist in high concentrations in the soil pose a threat of leaking into water sources and causing health problems if not remedied. Willows were planted in Greenwich Peninsula Ecology Park with the goal of having their roots reach the water table to bioaccumulate (via osmosis) these hydrocarbons and other contaminants. Small contaminant molecules such as 1,4-dioxane are evaporated to the atmosphere where ultraviolet light breaks down the compound into harmless chemical. With good management, phytoremediation is an economical, effective and environmental friendly way to quickly remove contaminants in soil and water.

== See also ==
- Dulwich Wood
