= Blackwall Point Power Station =

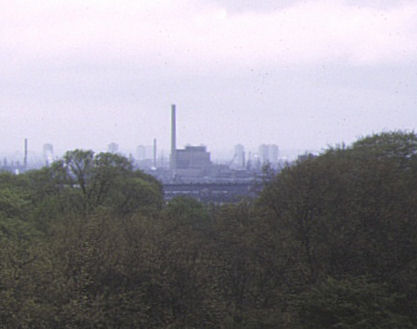
- Blackwall Point Power Station from Greenwich Park, 1973
- Country: England
- Location: Greenwich, London
- Coordinates: 51.497800°N 0.011500°E
- Status: Decommissioned and demolished
- Construction began: 1900 & 1947
- Commission date: 1900 & 1951
- Decommission date: 1947 & 1984
- Owners: Blackheath and Greenwich Electric Light Co. subsequently the South Metropolitan Electric Light and Power Co., then the County of London Electric Lighting Co. British Electricity Authority (1948–1955); Central Electricity Authority (1955–1957); Central Electricity Generating Board (1958–1984)
- Operator: Operated by owner

Thermal power station
- Primary fuel: Coal
- Site area: 3.5 acres
- Chimneys: One
- Cooling towers: None
- Cooling source: River water

Power generation
- Units operational: 3 × 30 MW (1951 station)
- Make and model: English Electric Company
- Units decommissioned: All
- Nameplate capacity: 100.5 MW
- Annual net output: see graph in text

External links
- Commons: Related media on Commons

Blackwall Point Power Station was a coal-fired power station on the east side of the Greenwich Peninsula, in London. An early station from the 1890s was replaced in 1951 by a new station, which itself ceased operation in 1984. The station was constructed on a three-acre site at the north-west end of River Way to the south-east of the South Metropolitan Gasworks, since redeveloped as East Parkside.

== History ==
The first Blackwall Point power station was built on the site of the East Greenwich tide mill by the Blackheath and Greenwich Electric Light Co. and began to supply the area in 1900 with plant totalling 750kW. By the time it closed in 1947 it had a capacity of 15 MW.

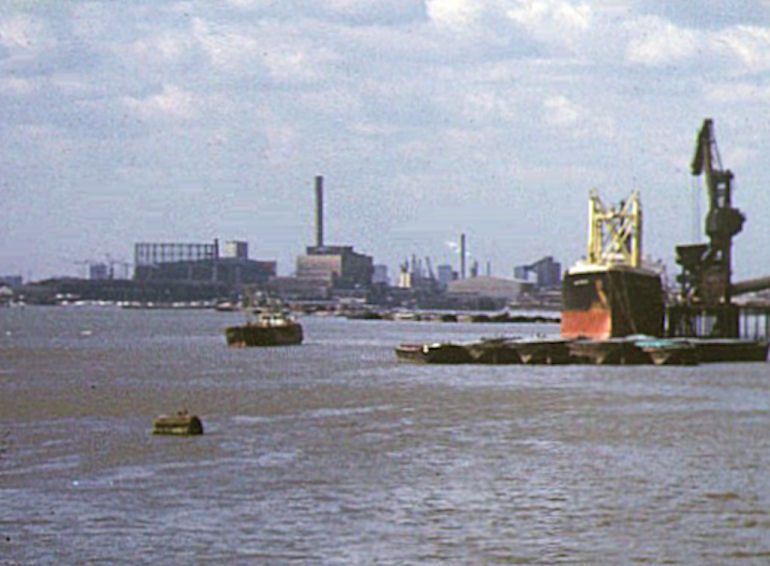
Blackwall Point Power Station seen from the east, 1973

The replacement station was planned by the South Metropolitan Electric Light and Power Co. from 1947. Following nationalisation of the electricity industry in 1948, planning and construction was taken over by the British Electricity Authority (BEA) which opened the station in 1952 on a small 3.5-acre site. It was the first London power station designed to be fired exclusively by pulverised coal. Coal from overhead bunkers was ground to a powder by pressurised mills and transported to the furnace by air fans. Coal was delivered to the station via a coaling pier on the river. The building was a steel framed structure with brick and glass cladding. The box-like boiler house was to the north of the low engine room, the switch house was to the left. There was a single reinforced concrete chimney.

The station was equipped with three nominal 30 MW turbo alternators generating at 11 kV and supplied by the English Electric Company, giving the station a generating capacity of 90 MW. Steam was supplied by three coal-fired Babcock & Wilcox boilers, with condenser cooling water taken from the river. The maximum steam capacity of the boilers was 1,095,000 lb/hr (138 kg/s). Steam pressure and temperature at the turbine stop valves was 600 psi (41.4 bar) and 454 °C. In 1954 the station used 167,000 tons of coal.

The first turbo-alternator set was commissioned in the summer of 1951, subsequent sets coming into use by the spring of 1952.

Blackwall Point was originally in the London Division of the BEA, which subsequently became the Central Electricity Authority (1955–57) and from 1958 the Central Electricity Generating Board.

=== Electricity output ===
Electricity output from Blackwell Point power station over the period 1961–1981 was as follows.

Blackwell Point annual electricity output GWh

=== Decommissioning ===
The station closed on 26 October 1981 with a capacity of 86 MW. The power station was demolished and the site cleared in 1987. Today the only visible remains of the station is the coaling pier in the Thames.
