= London Buses route 436 =

London bus route

436
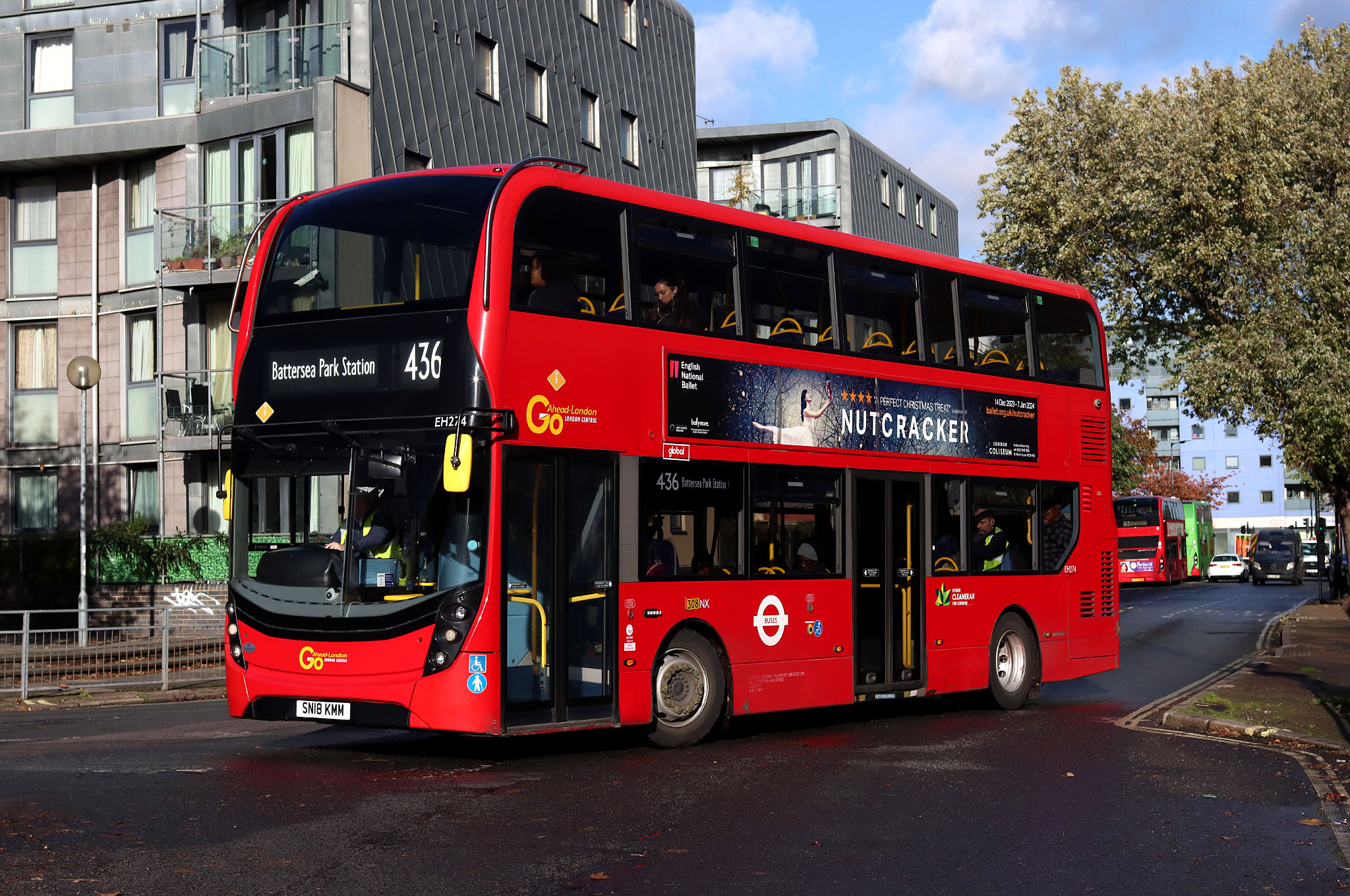
- London Central Alexander Dennis Enviro400H MMC in Peckham in November 2023

Overview
- Operator: London Central (Go-Ahead London)
- Garage: New Cross
- Vehicle: Alexander Dennis Enviro400H MMC
- Peak vehicle requirement: 16
- Predecessors: Route 36
- Night-time: N136

Route
- Start: Battersea Park station
- Via: Vauxhall; Camberwell; Peckham; New Cross Gate
- End: Lewisham Shopping Centre
- Length: 7 miles (11 km)

Service
- Level: Daily
- Frequency: About every 7-12 minutes
- Journey time: 41-74 minutes
- Operates: 05:00 until 01:22

London Buses route 436 is a Transport for London contracted bus route in London, England. Running between Battersea Park station and Lewisham Shopping Centre, it is operated by Go-Ahead London subsidiary London Central.

== History ==
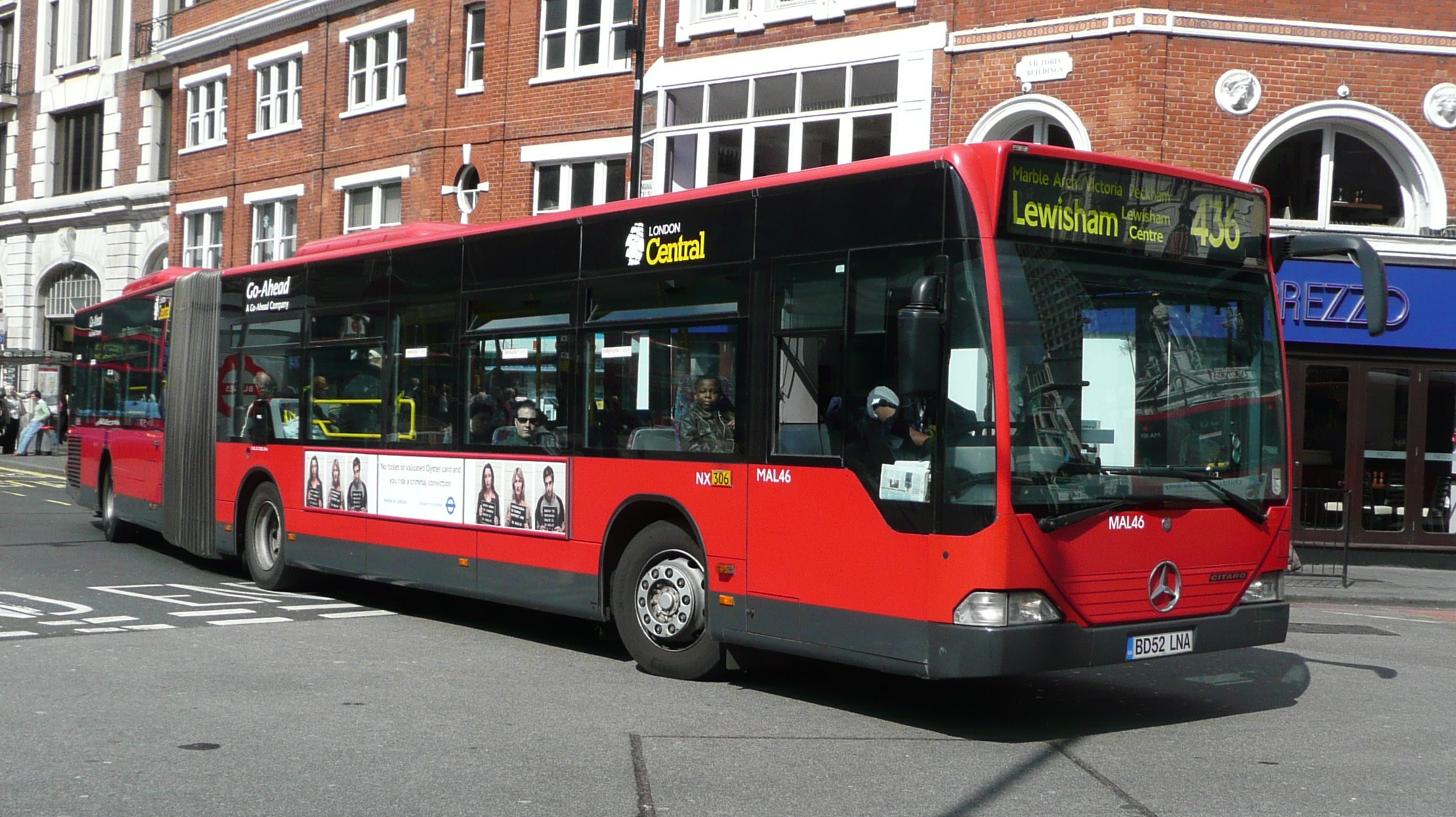
London Central Mercedes-Benz O530G at Victoria bus station in October 2008

Route 436 was introduced on 8 February 2003 when route 36 Queen's Park to Lewisham was curtailed to New Cross Gate. These changes were made in preparation for the introduction of the London congestion charge. Operated by London Central's New Cross garage, it was the third route in London (after Red Arrow routes 507 and 521) to be operated by articulated buses.

In March 2004 a bus on 436 caught fire on Park Lane, this was the third fire in as many months and the whole Mercedes-Benz O530G fleet, was subsequently withdrawn, and route 436 was suspended. Extra buses were run on route 36, with limited services operated on route 436 with double-deck buses. After a short period time modifications were made to the O530G fleet.

On 19 November 2011, route 436 was retained by London Central and was converted to double deck operation with Alexander Dennis Enviro400Hs and Alexander Dennis Enviro400s as part of the Mayor of London's policy to replace the O530Gs. The route was one of the final three in London to use articulated buses, their withdrawal was criticised due to the resulting reduction in capacity. They were phased out in an attempt to reduce fare evasion. The former vehicles now operate in Brighton and Hove.

In late 2016, the route was altered west of Vauxhall bus station to terminate at Battersea Park station instead of Paddington station.

== Current route ==
Route 436 operates via these primary locations:

- Battersea Park station
- Battersea Power Station
- St George Wharf
- Vauxhall bus station for Vauxhall station
- Oval station
- Camberwell Green
- Peckham High Street
- Queens Road Peckham station
- New Cross Gate station
- St Johns station
- Lewisham station
- Lewisham Shopping Centre
