= Wright Electrocity =

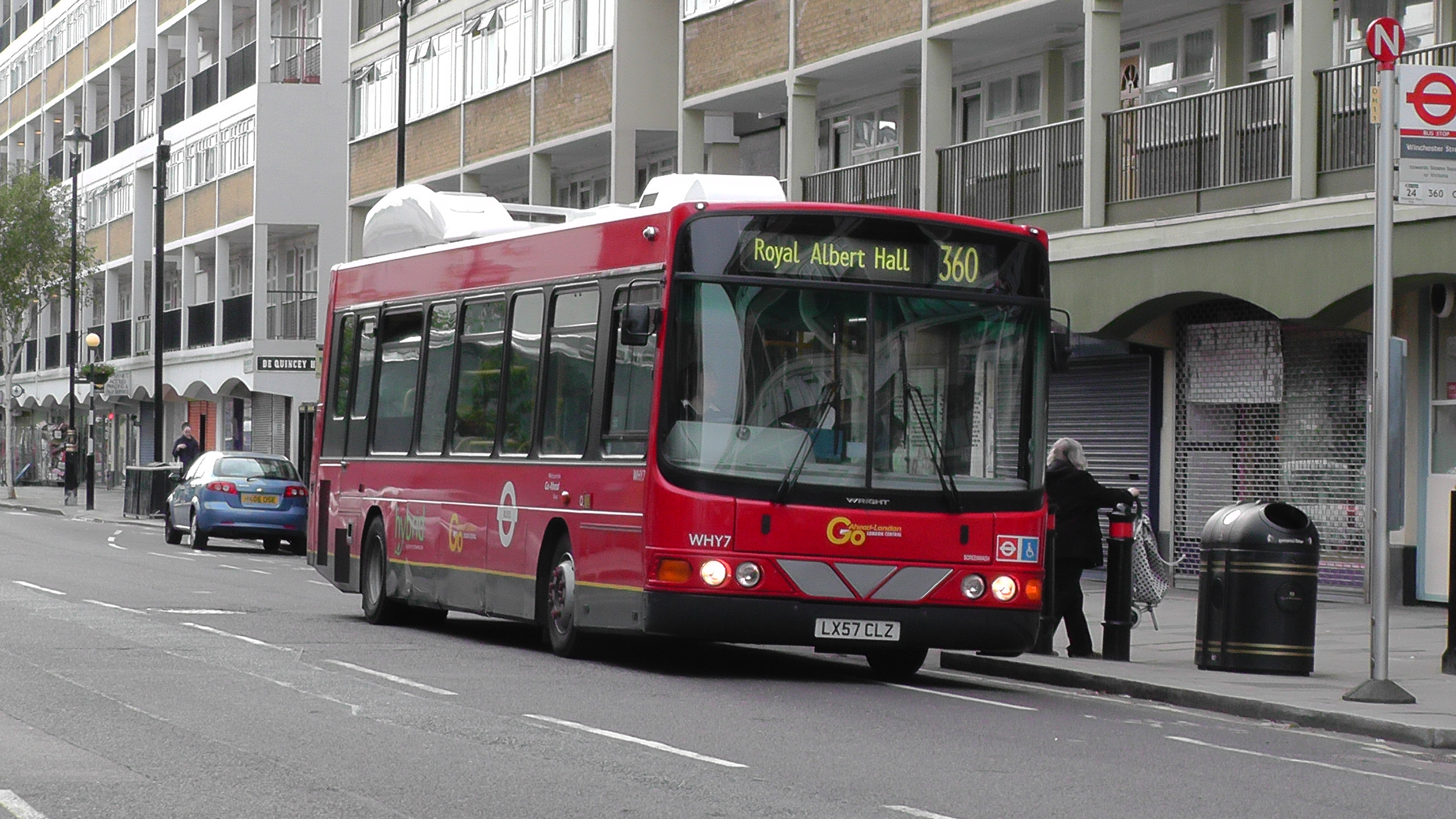
- London Central Wright Electrocity on route 360 in Pimlico in June 2013

Overview
- Manufacturer: Wrightbus
- Production: 2002 - 2013
- Assembly: Ballymena, Northern Ireland

Body and chassis
- Doors: 2
- Floor type: Low floor
- Chassis: Dennis Dart SLF; DAF/VDL SB120

Powertrain
- Engine: Vauxhall (1st 6); Cummins ISBe

Dimensions
- Length: 10.1 metres 10.9 metres

Chronology
- Successor: Wright StreetAir

The Wright Electrocity was a type of hybrid electric bus built by Wrightbus between 2002 and 2013. The Electrocity was based on DAF/VDL SB120 chassis for most of these buses, except for a single Dennis Dart SLF prototype.

== History ==
Two Electrocity prototypes were initially built in 2002; one based on DAF SB120 chassis, the other based on a Dennis Dart SLF chassis. The bodywork design was similar to the existing Wright Cadet and Crusader, which were also built on DAF SB120 and Dennis Dart SLF chassis respectively, with the addition of battery pods on the roof of the Electrocity being the main difference. The Electrocity was the first bus of its kind to be built, and the prototypes competed mainly with the TransBus Enviro200H.

The Electrocity design was facelifted in 2005 to match the updated Cadet design, with the main noticeable change being rounded front headlights. Following the collapse of TransBus International in 2004 and subsequent cancellation of the Enviro200H programme, in February 2006 London Central placed six Electrocitys based on VDL SB120 chassis into service on route 360.

Originally equipped with lead-acid batteries and 1.9 litre Vauxhall engines, in 2011 all were rebuilt by Wrightbus with lithium-ion batteries and 4.5 litre Cummins ISBe engines. The hybrid management system was converted from Enova to Siemens. Externally they received larger white pods on the rear roofs to house the batteries.

All subsequent Electrocitys were built on VDL SB120 chassis. In 2007, another five were built for Travel London for use on route 129. A single Electrocity was built for London Central in 2008, followed by a batch of six in 2011, to allow for a full conversion of route 360.

The Electrocity was superseded by the Wright StreetAir in 2016.
