= London Buses route 360 =

London bus route

360
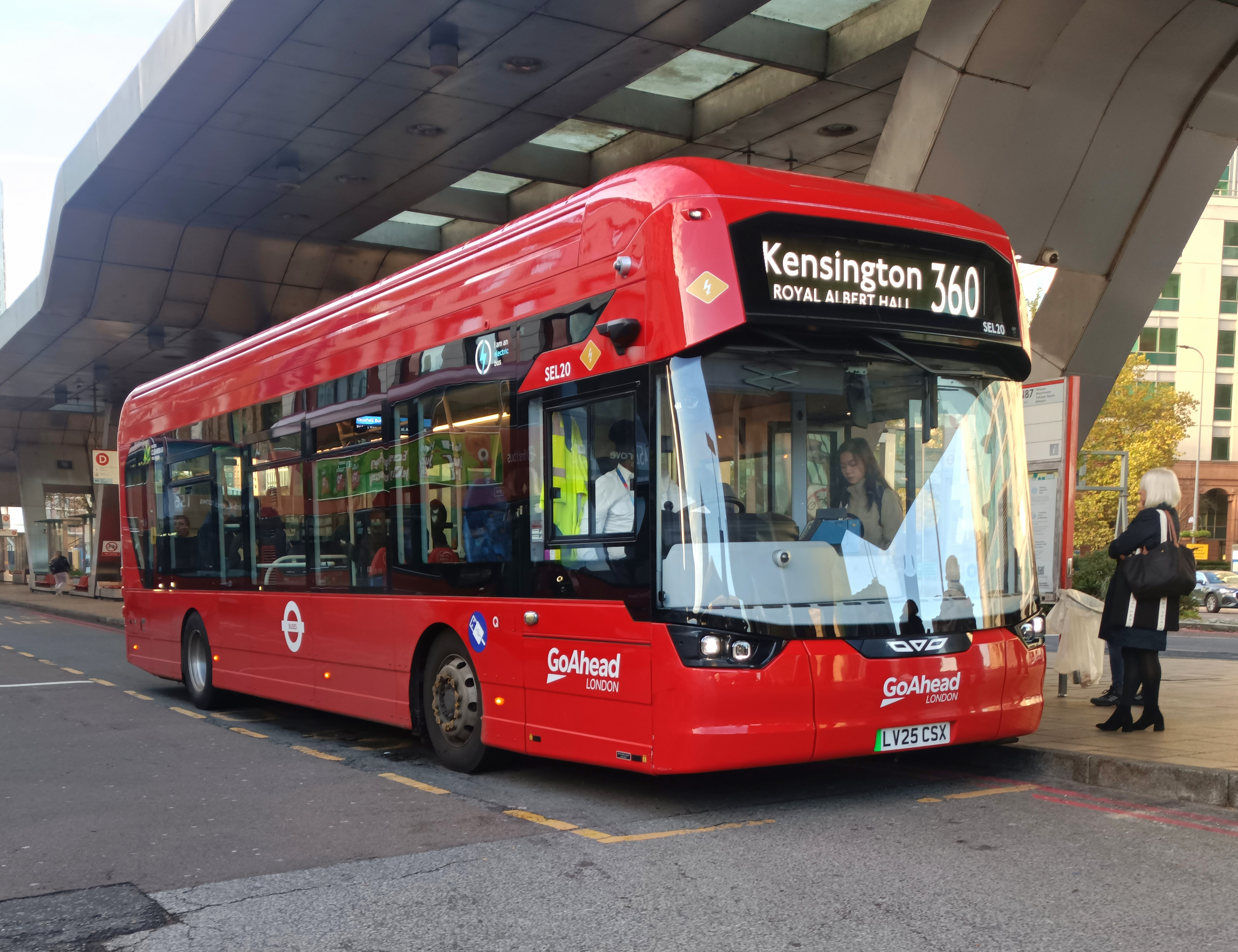
- London Central Wright GB Kite Electroliner at Vauxhall bus station in October 2025

Overview
- Operator: London Central (Go-Ahead London)
- Garage: Camberwell
- Vehicle: BYD Alexander Dennis Enviro200EV; Wright GB Kite Electroliner

Route
- Start: Elephant and Castle
- Via: Lambeth; Vauxhall; Pimlico; Sloane Square; Kensington
- End: Royal Albert Hall

London Buses route 360 is a Transport for London contracted bus route in London, England. Running between Elephant and Castle and Royal Albert Hall, it is operated by Go-Ahead London subsidiary London Central.

== History ==
The route was the first in London to use hybrid electric buses, with six vehicles built by Wrightbus, branded Electrocity, entering service in February 2006. The trial was announced in March 2005; route 360 was chosen as it is one of few single-deck routes to operate in central London. Six diesel buses were operated alongside the hybrids for comparison. The hybrids were temporarily withdrawn shortly after their introduction following problems with engine overheating.

In November 2009, it was announced that London Central had successfully tendered to retain the route, which would be converted to full hybrid operation using a mixture of new and existing vehicles from 23 January 2010, the first route to use only hybrid vehicles. In August 2014, new passenger information screens were introduced on one bus on the route.

The hybrid buses were replaced by electric BYD Alexander Dennis Enviro200EV single-deckers in November 2017.

== Current route ==
Route 360 operates via these primary locations:

- Elephant and Castle
- Imperial War Museum
- Albert Embankment
- Vauxhall bus station for Vauxhall station
- Vauxhall Bridge
- Pimlico station
- Lister Hospital
- Sloane Square station
- South Kensington station
- Royal Albert Hall
