= Vauxhall bus station =

Bus station in Vauxhall, London

Coordinates: 51.4855°N 0.1243°W

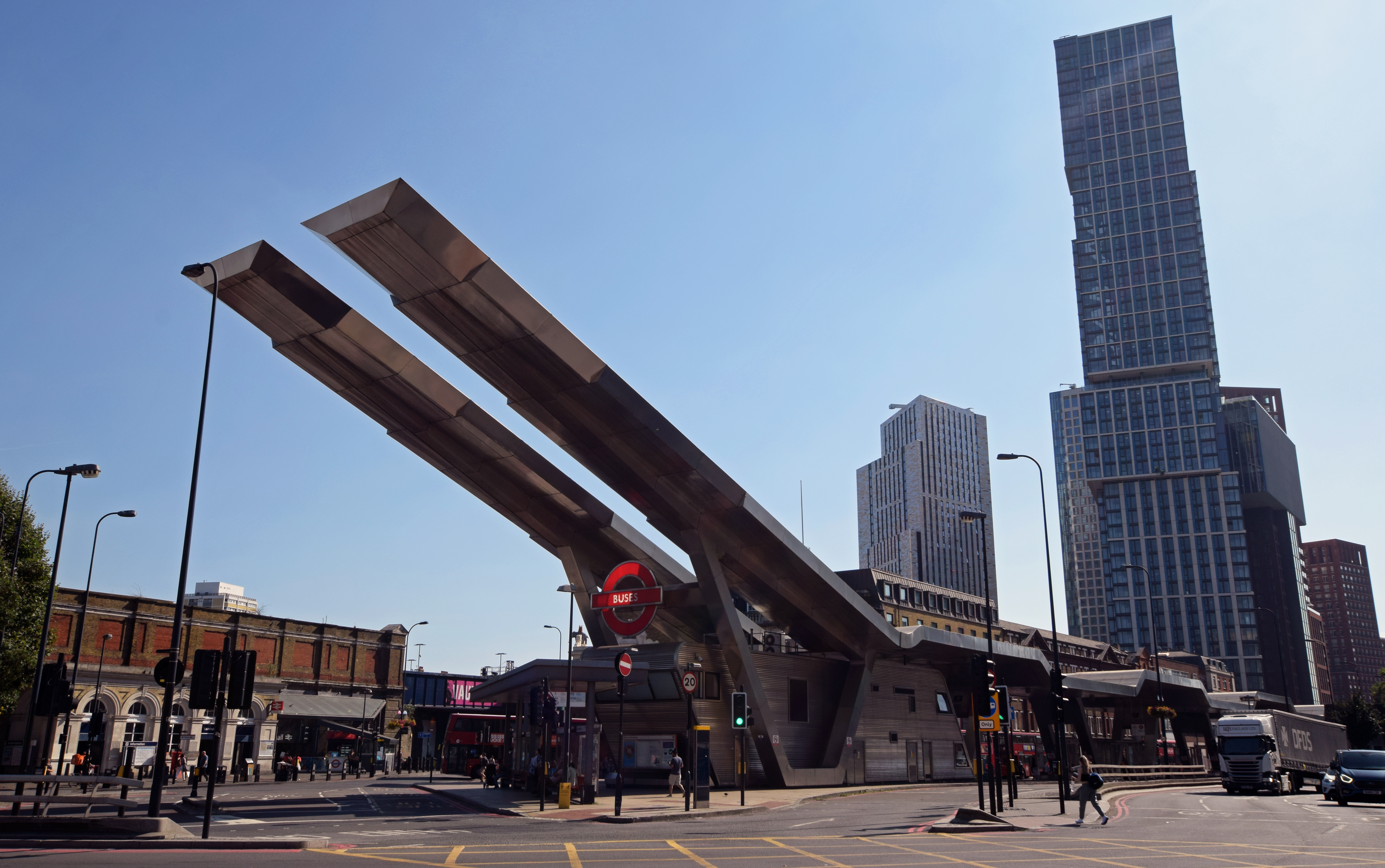
- The bus station in 2021

General information
- Location: Bondway, Vauxhall; Lambeth
- Owner: Transport for London
- Operator: London Buses
- Bus routes: 2, 36, 77, 87, 88, 156, 185, 196, 344, 360, 436, 452, N2, N87, N136
- Bus stands: 9
- Bus operators: Arriva London; London Central; London General; London Transit; Transport UK London Bus
- Connections: Vauxhall station

History
- Opened: 4 December 2004; 21 years ago
Location

Vauxhall bus station is a bus station in Vauxhall, in the London Borough of Lambeth. It is operated by London Buses and owned and maintained by Transport for London, and is the second busiest bus station in the city.

The station, which is adjacent to the Vauxhall railway and tube stations, is situated on Bondway between Wandsworth Road, Kennington Road and Parry Street.

== Layout ==
In 2004, bus stops were moved from outlying roads (South Lambeth Road, Wandsworth Road, Vauxhall Bridge) to a central point at the Vauxhall Cross road junction to create an improved transport interchange.

The bus station was designed by Arup Group. It incorporates two cantilevered arms that contain 167 solar panels, which provide a third of the bus station's electricity.

The nine stands are served by Transport for London contracted operators Arriva London, London Central, London General, London Transit and Transport UK London Bus.

== Connections ==
Directly south next to the bus station is Vauxhall station for London Underground's Victoria line and South Western Railway.

== Under threat of demolition ==
In 2013, Lambeth Council and Transport for London announced plans to demolish the bus station to build a new High Street, as part of Vauxhall's regeneration plans. The Vauxhall Society campaigned against the demolition and set up a petition to pressure the government to reconsider. An attempt to get the bus station Listed building status failed in 2014.

By 2019 the plans were to build two residential tower blocks on the site, at heights of 53 and 42 floors, with a new bus station on the ground floor. A four-day public inquiry into the future of the project began in December 2019. In April 2020, Robert Jenrick upheld the development decisions and demolition was approved.

== Gallery ==
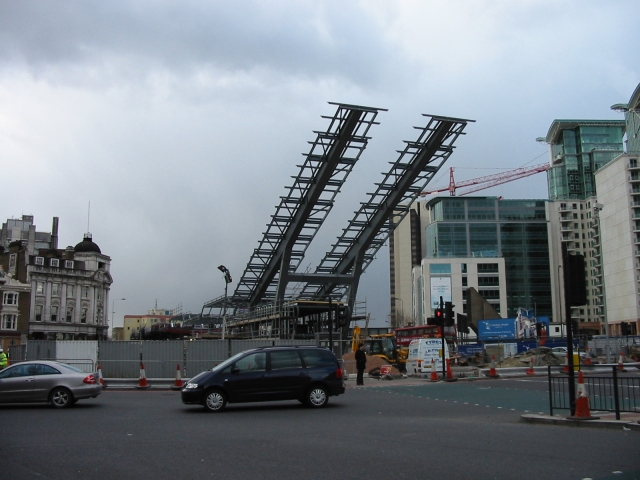
Westbound view during construction in March 2004

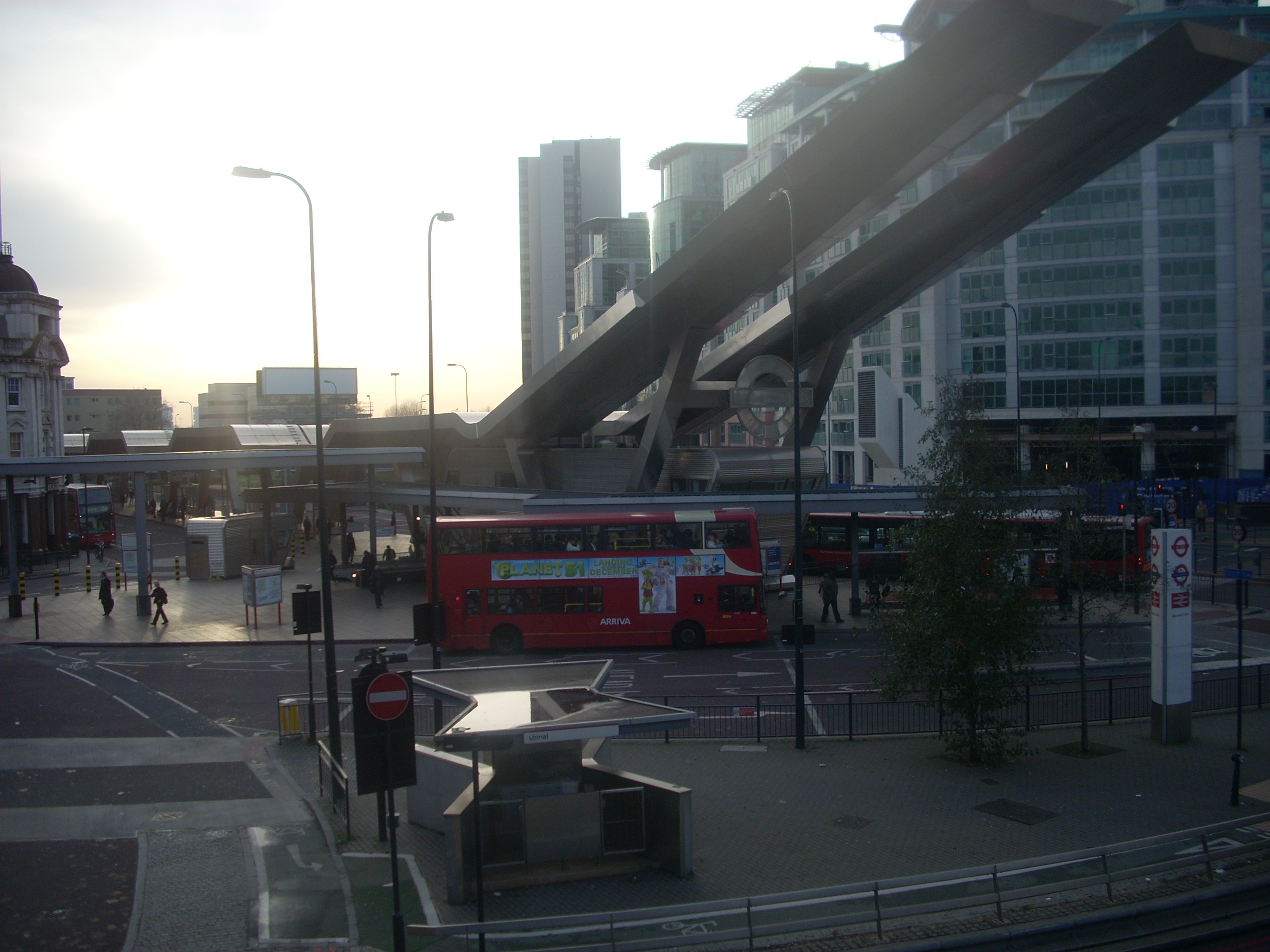
Westbound view in December 2009

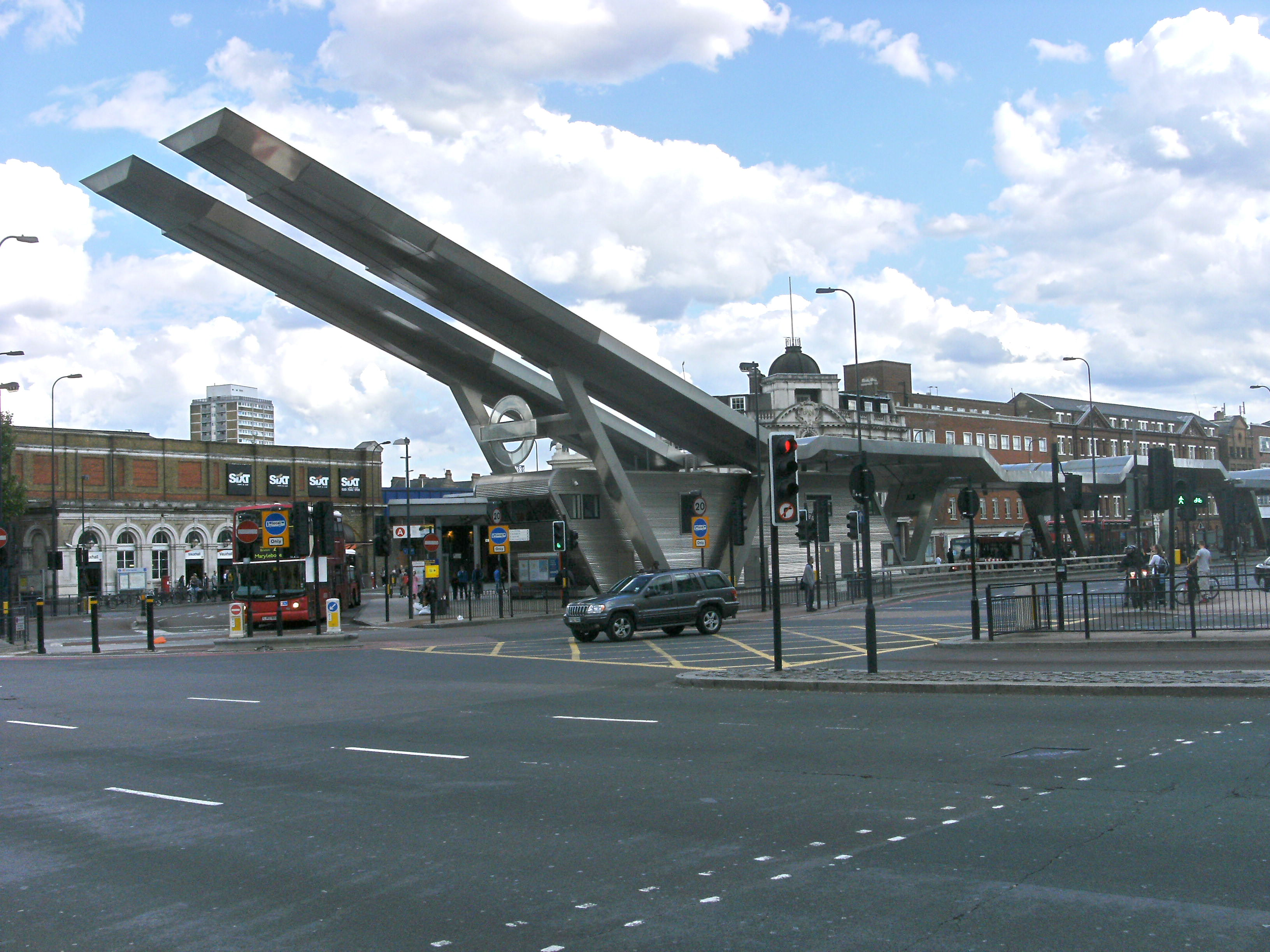
Southbound view in June 2011

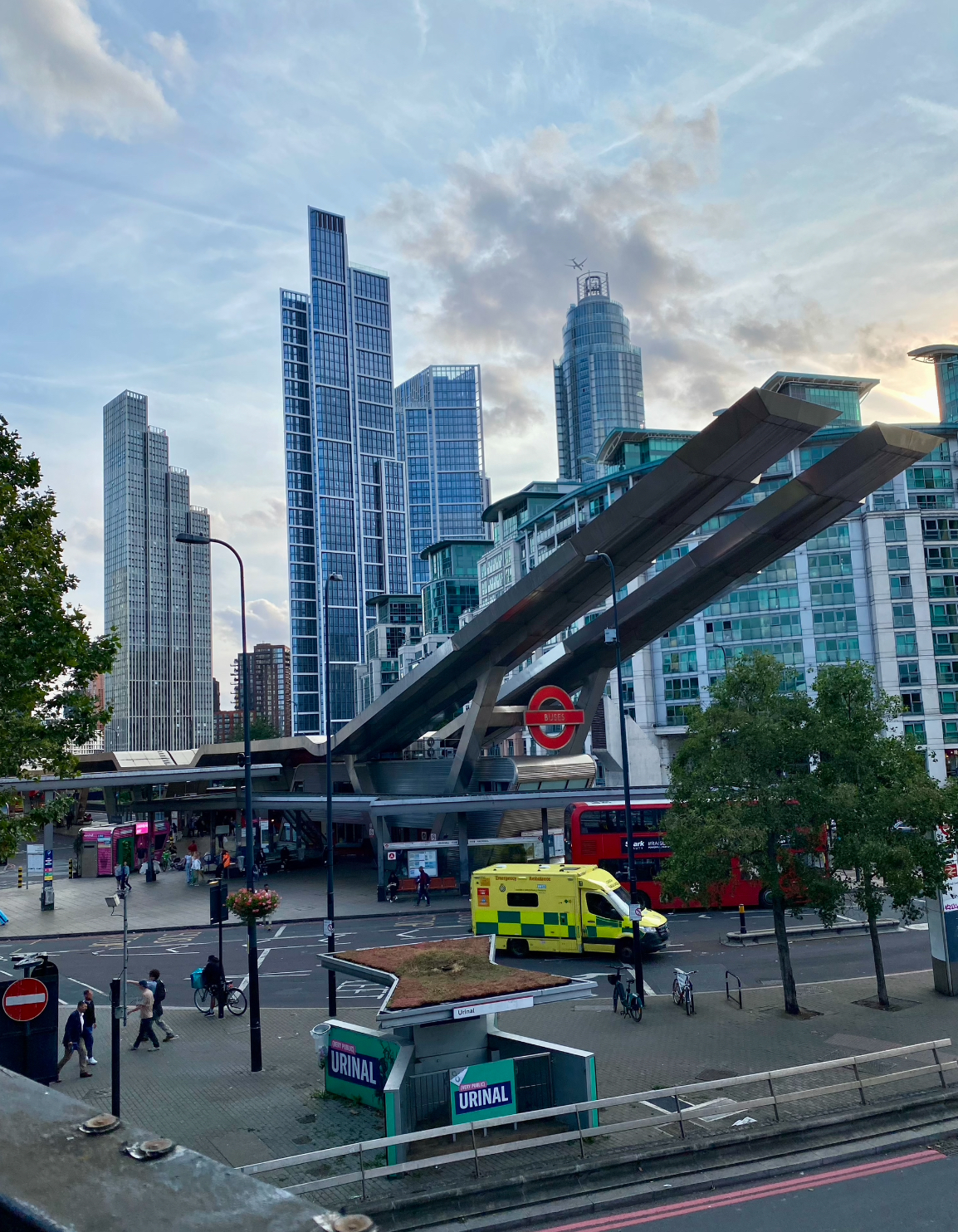
Looking South-West, 2024
