= Wright StreetAir =

Electric bus

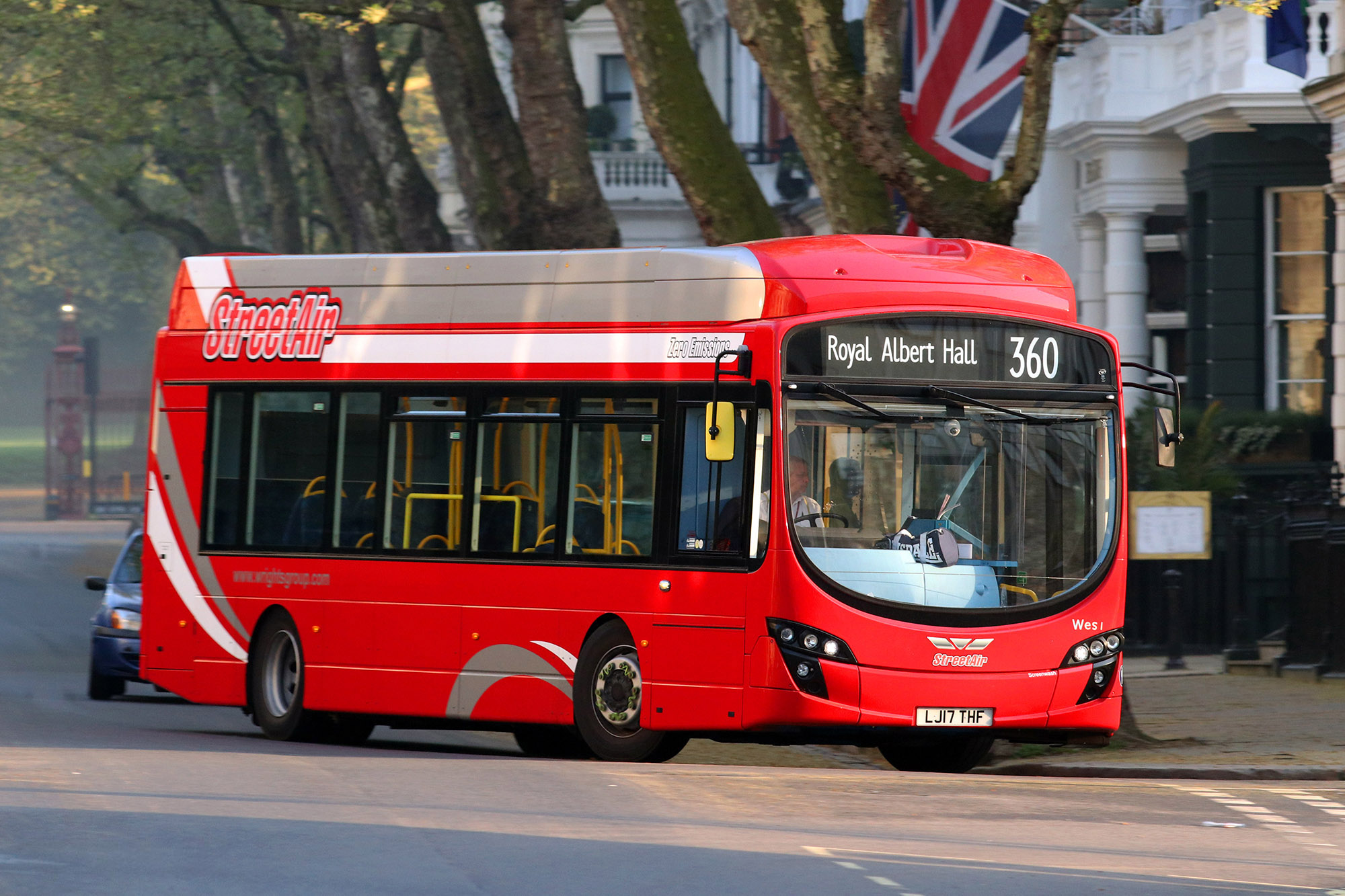
- Wright StreetAir demonstrator on trial in London in April 2018

Overview
- Manufacturer: Wrightbus
- Production: 2016-2017
- Assembly: Ballymena, Northern Ireland

Body and chassis
- Class: Single-decker electric bus
- Doors: 1 or 2
- Floor type: Low floor
- Chassis: Integral

Dimensions
- Length: 10.6 metres (35 ft)
- Width: 2.5 metres (8.2 ft)
- Height: 3.0 metres (9.8 ft)
- Curb weight: 18 tonnes

Chronology
- Predecessor: Wright Electrocity
- Successor: Wright GB Kite

The Wright StreetAir is a low-floor single-decker electric bus design built by Wrightbus in Ballymena, Northern Ireland in 2016 and 17. An integral product based on a single-deck variant of the Wright StreetDeck chassis, the StreetAir replaces the Wright Electrocity in Wrightbus' product range.

== History ==
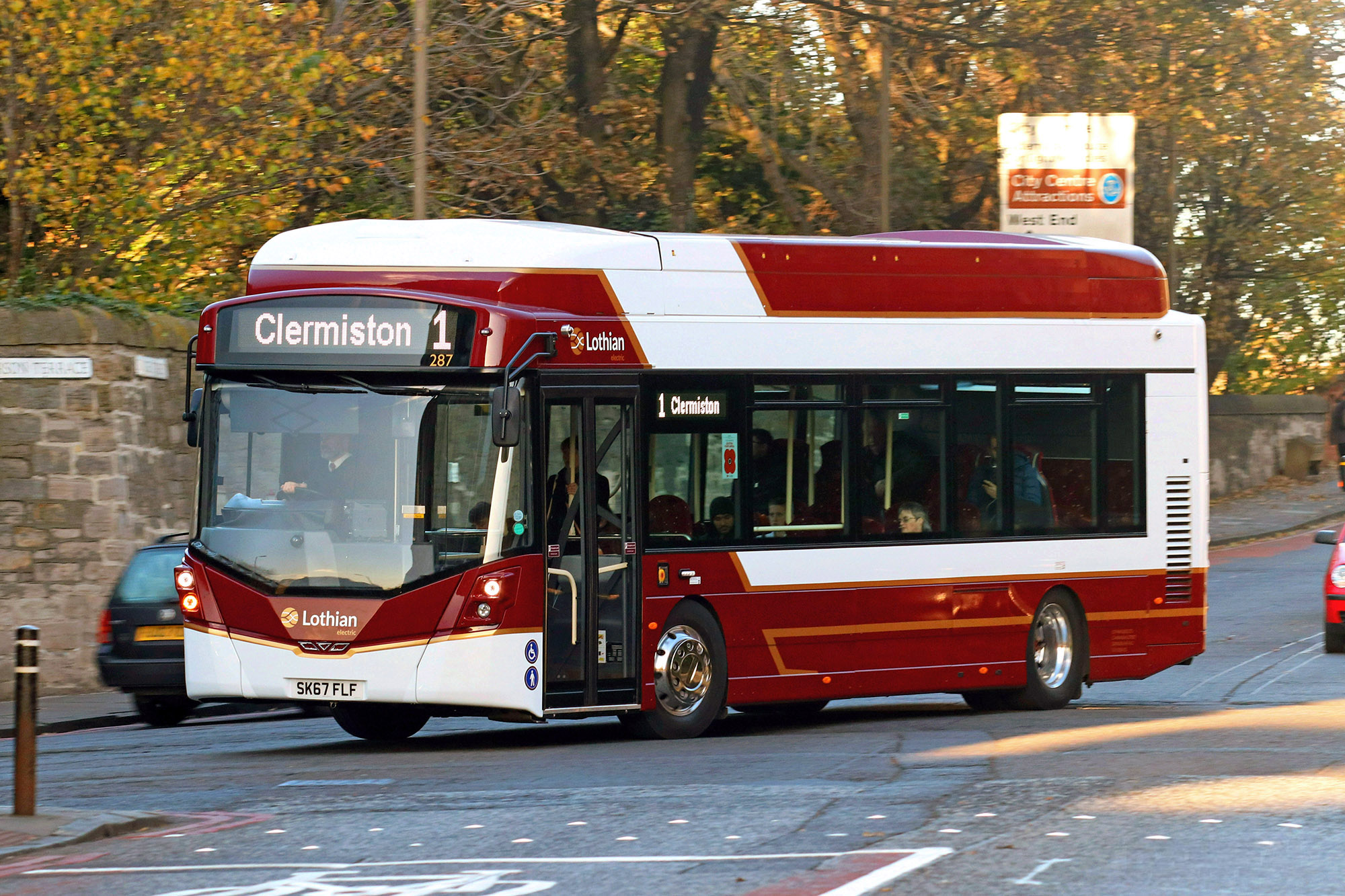
Lothian Buses was the first operator to put the StreetAir in service.

The StreetAir was initially revealed in August 2016 as the replacement for the Wright Electrocity. It is based on a single-deck, all-electric version of the Wright StreetDeck integral double-decker bus. The StreetAir was available in a single 10.6 metre length weighing 18 tonnes.

The body design of the StreetAir is based on the Wright Eclipse Urban. The StreetAir was available with electricity conduction via overnight (plug-in), inductive (through the road surface) or conductive (with a pantograph) methods.

The first six StreetAirs entered service with Lothian Buses in October 2017, aside from a single prototype vehicle trialled with bus operators in London.

A similar model to the Streetair, the GB Kite range was launched in September 2021, following the launch of the double-deck Wright StreetDeck Electroliner and Hydroliner range earlier in the year. This replaced the Wright Streetair.

== Unbuilt variants ==
When the StreetAir was first launched in August 2016, it was also offered as a double-decker bus based on the Wright StreetDeck and as a shorter-wheelbase single-decker bus based on the Wright StreetLite WF as opposed to the longer door-forward StreetDeck chassis. The short wheelbase variant was intended to replace the Wright StreetLite EV, with a number of drivetrain improvements over the previous model. None of either variant had been built by the time Wrightbus entered administration in September 2019, and both were dropped from the Wrightbus range after they exited administration.
