= London Buses route 486 =

London bus route

486
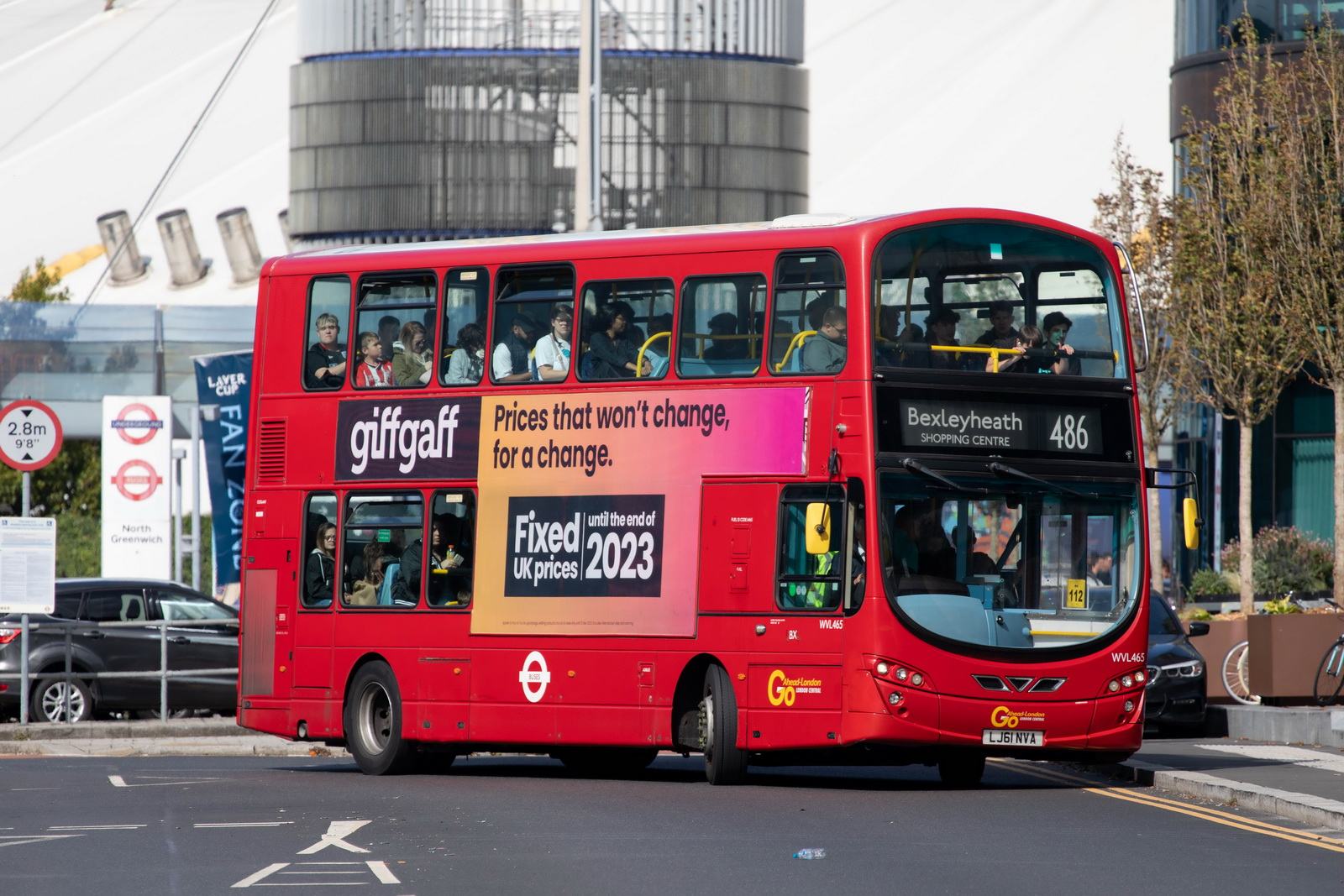
- London Central Wright Eclipse Gemini 2 bodied Volvo B9TL on the Greenwich Peninsula in September 2022

Overview
- Operator: London Central (Go-Ahead London)
- Garage: Bexleyheath
- Vehicle: Volvo B9TL Wright Eclipse Gemini 2
- Peak vehicle requirement: Day: 14; Night: 3
- Predecessors: Route M1; Route M2
- Night-time: 24-hour service

Route
- Start: Bexleyheath town centre
- Via: Welling; Shooter's Hill; Queen Elizabeth Hospital; Charlton
- End: North Greenwich bus station
- Length: 12 miles (19 km)

Service
- Level: 24-hour service
- Frequency: Daytime: About every 8-15 minutes Night-time: About every 30 minutes
- Operates: 24-hour service

London Buses route 486 is a Transport for London contracted bus route in London, England. Running between Bexleyheath town centre and North Greenwich bus station, it is operated by Go-Ahead London subsidiary London Central.

== History ==
=== M1 ===
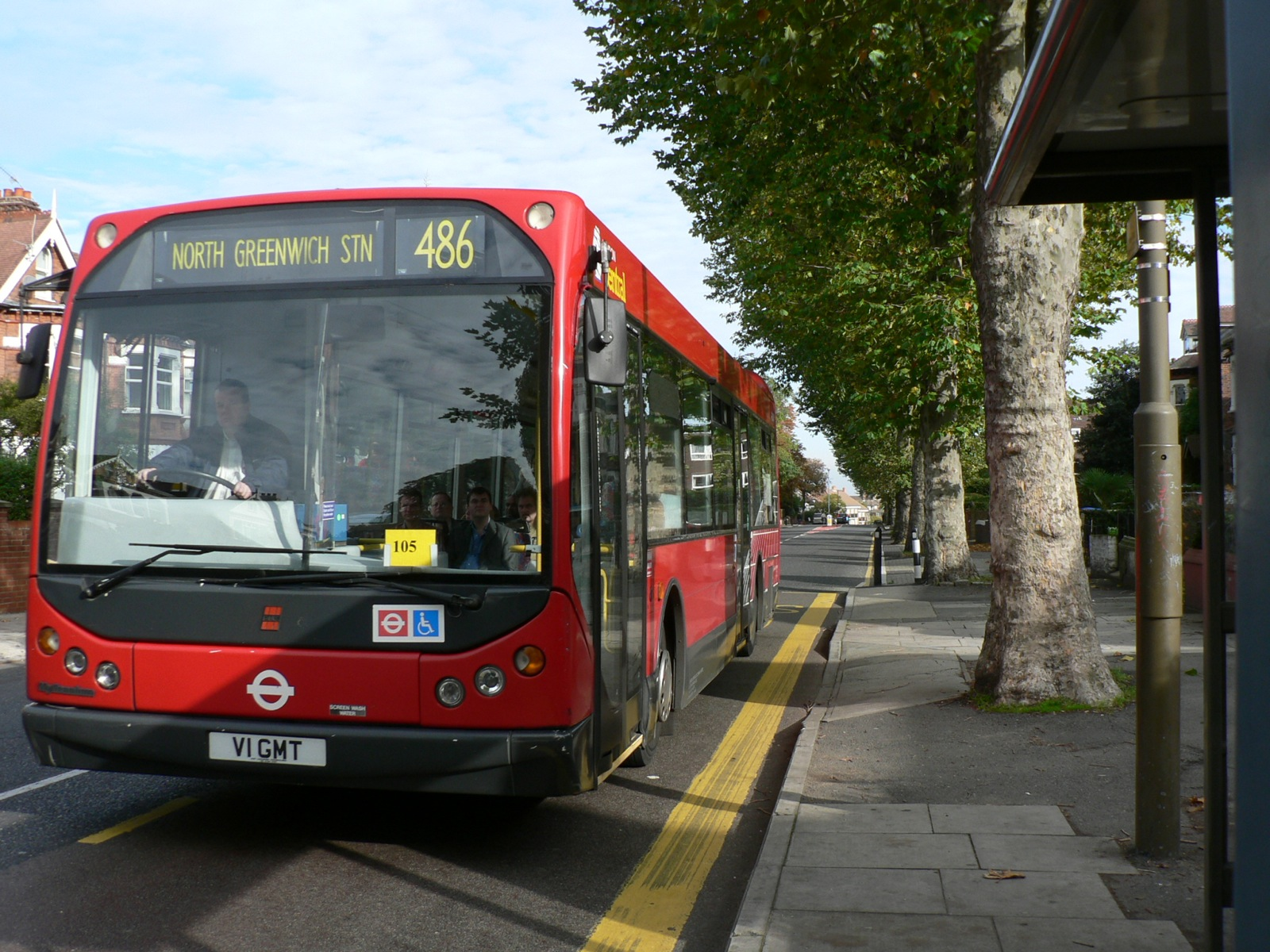
London Central East Lancs Myllennium bodied DAF SB220, originally used on the M1 service, in October 2005

The Millennium Dome (now known as The O2) was constructed between June 1997 and December 1999 as part of the United Kingdom's celebrations of the third millennium, with construction beginning in 1997 intending to help regenerate the industrialised Greenwich Peninsula. The construction of the Dome on the former site of the East Greenwich Gas Works, involving the use of land reclamation, was also supplemented with the building of the nearby Greenwich Millennium Village, both planned to be served by the London Underground's Jubilee Line Extension to Stratford via Canary Wharf. London Buses route 108, which uniquely ran through the Blackwall Tunnel, became the first London bus route to serve the Millennium Dome when it was rerouted from 21 November 1998, serving Dome staff and construction workers through stopping in a secure area within the site.

When the Millennium Dome opened as a visitor attraction on 1 January 2000, shuttle services M1 and M2 were launched to transport visitors from south-east London, provided by London Buses with funding from English Partnerships, the New Millennium Experience Company and Greenwich London Borough Council. Operated by London Central from their New Cross bus garage, these routes linked the Dome with Charlton and Greenwich railway stations respectively as part of the 'Millennium Transit' system. Seventeen East Lancs Myllennium single-deck buses on DAF SB220 chassis were delivered for use on the services in late 1999, which were equipped with air conditioning as well as power-operated destination blinds and audiovisual announcements, which were subsequently rolled out to new London buses from the mid-2000s onwards. Three of the buses were also LPG gas-powered.

The buses also featured an electronic guidance system designed by Alstom for use on a 0.8 miles (1.3 km) section of the M1's 'Millennium Busway'. The system consisted of two low voltage electric cables buried in the road, which were tracked by equipment fitted to the bus, removing the need for guide wheels and raised kerbs used on conventional guided busways. This system made the busway fall under the jurisdiction of Her Majesty's Railway Inspectorate, whose demands for extensive testing made the M1's introduction slip from its original December 1999 date to January 2000. Buses on the M1 never ran in passenger-carrying service using the experimental guidance system, with London Buses later admitting that the guidance system was not yet ready for deployment on the planned busway, resulting in the M1 instead using roads paralleling the busway throughout 2000.

=== 486 ===
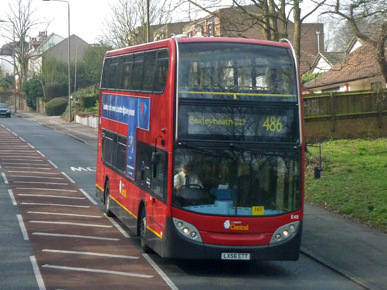
London Central Alexander Dennis Enviro400 on Shooter's Hill in March 2012

Following the end of the Millennium celebration programme, it was planned that the M1 and M2 shuttles would be permanently withdrawn. However, as the M1 proved highly popular with local commuters heading to North Greenwich bus station to board the Jubilee line at North Greenwich tube station, route 486 commenced operations as a regular tendered bus service along the route of the M1 from 24 February 2001. London Central reused the fleet of 17 East Lancs Myllenniums downgraded to regular service buses on the service. The Millennium Busway eventually launched on 2 June 2001, resulting in the 486, as well as routes 422 and 472, being diverted onto the busway.

From 23 February 2002, an extension of route 486 to Bexleyheath was introduced, terminating at Bexleyheath Shopping Centre. As a result, operations of the 486 transferred from London Central's New Cross garage to Bexleyheath bus garage, where the only Wright Eclipse built for a London bus operator on Volvo B7L chassis was introduced on the service to supplement the Myllenniums.

Double-decker buses were introduced to the 486 in January 2007 following London Central's retainment of its tender to run the service. These consisted of 17 Alexander Dennis Enviro400s, the first to enter service with London Central, which replaced the Myllenniums and the Wright Eclipse.

Although running on every day of the year, from its introduction, the 486 only ran on nights from Monday to Friday. In response to demand for a night service in the Charlton area, Transport for London introduced nighttime 486 services running every 30 minutes on weekends from 12 September 2015, additionally serving Night Tube users when the service was introduced to the Jubilee line from 7 October 2016. The 486's weekend night services were suspended from March 2020 due to the COVID-19 pandemic, however they were reinstated over three years later on 28 July 2023.

The frequency of the 486 was cut back on 23 February 2019 from every eight minutes to every 10 minutes on weekdays, with the Saturday frequency reduced to every 12 minutes.

== Current route ==
Route 486 operates via these primary locations:

- Bexleyheath town centre
- Crook Log
- Welling station
- Shooter's Hill
- Queen Elizabeth Hospital
- Royal Artillery Barracks
- Charlton station
- Greenwich Millennium Village
- North Greenwich bus station for North Greenwich station
