= London Buses route 36 =

London bus route

36
- London Central Alexander Dennis Enviro400H MMC at Paddington station in July 2026

Overview
- Operator: London Central (Go-Ahead London)
- Garage: New Cross
- Vehicle: Alexander Dennis Enviro400H MMC
- Peak vehicle requirement: Day: 27; Night: 7
- Night-time: 24-hour service

Route
- Start: New Cross bus garage
- Via: Peckham; Camberwell; Vauxhall; Victoria; Hyde Park Corner; Marble Arch; Edgware Road; Paddington; Maida Hill
- End: Queen's Park station
- Length: 9 miles (14 km)

Service
- Level: 24-hour service
- Frequency: About every 6-12 minutes
- Journey time: 49-91 minutes
- Operates: 24-hour service

London Buses route 36 is a Transport for London contracted bus route in London, England. Running between New Cross bus garage and Queen's Park station, it is operated by Go-Ahead London subsidiary London Central.

== History ==
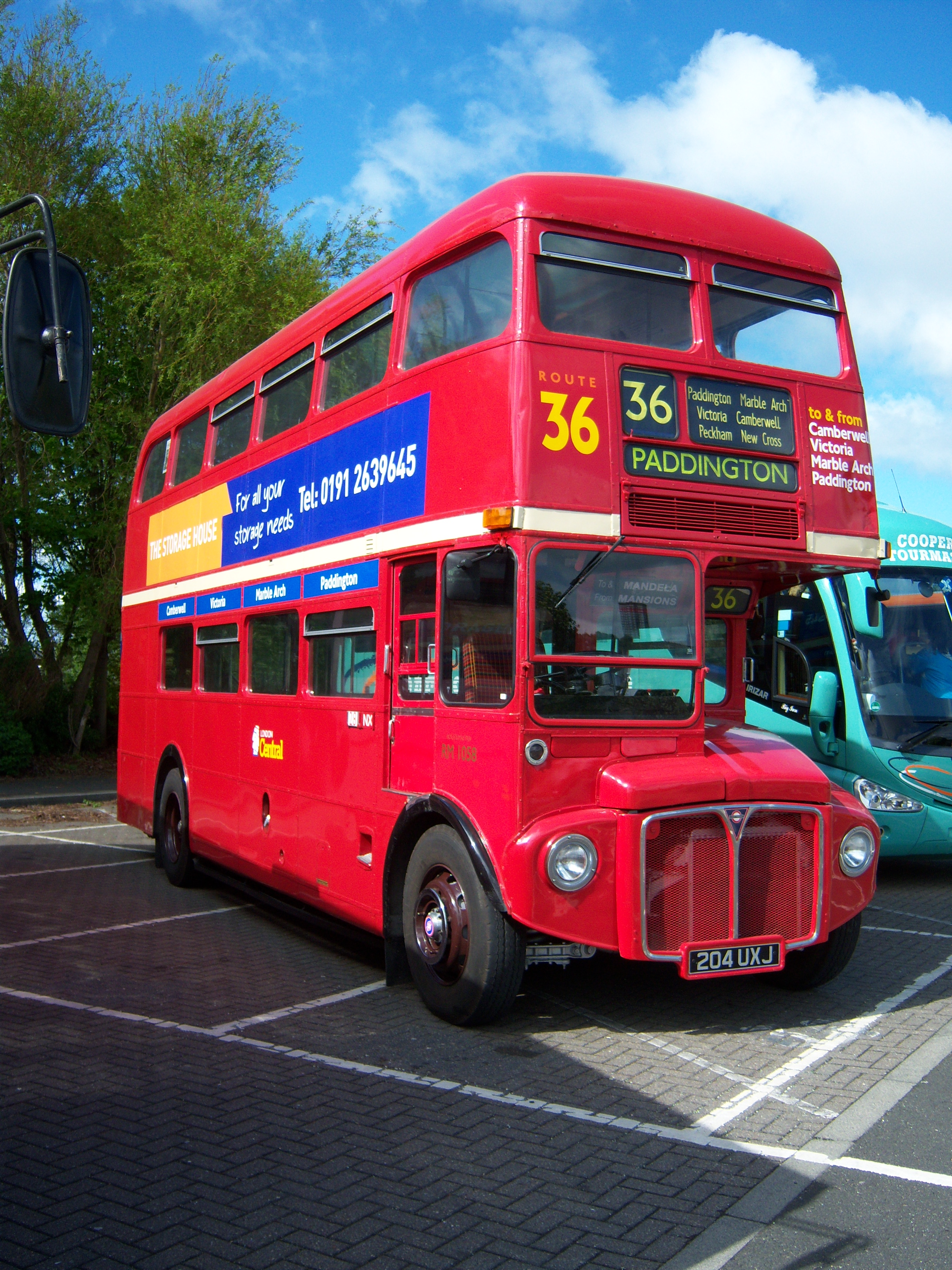
London Central AEC Routemaster with route 36 branding

Route 36 dates back to 1911 when London General Omnibus Company commenced operating between Queen's Park and Victoria. By 1934 it had been extended to Hither Green.

On 24 August 1961, a gun and five boxes of ammunition were found under the rear seat of a 36A bus in Peckham garage. The gun was identified as that used to kill Michael Gregsten and wound Valerie Storie in the 'A6 murder case', for which James Hanratty was hanged.

The 36B was cut back to Peckham and renumbered route 136 in March 1994.

On 29 January 2005, route 36 was converted to one-man operation with the AEC Routemasters replaced by Plaxton President bodied Volvo B7TLs.

== Present day ==
It is one of very few routes still to cross central London, carrying people into the centre from both ends of the route.

On 9 February 2013, Go-Ahead London retained the contract for route 36 with new and existing Alexander Dennis Enviro400s. It is operated out of New Cross garage.

== Current route ==
Route 36 operates via these primary locations:

- New Cross bus garage
- Queens Road Peckham station
- Peckham High Street
- Camberwell Green
- Oval station
- Vauxhall bus station for Vauxhall station
- Pimlico station
- Victoria station
- Hyde Park Corner
- Marble Arch station
- St Mary's Hospital
- Paddington station
- Royal Oak station
- Maida Hill
- Queen's Park station
