= London Central =

Bus operator in South London, England

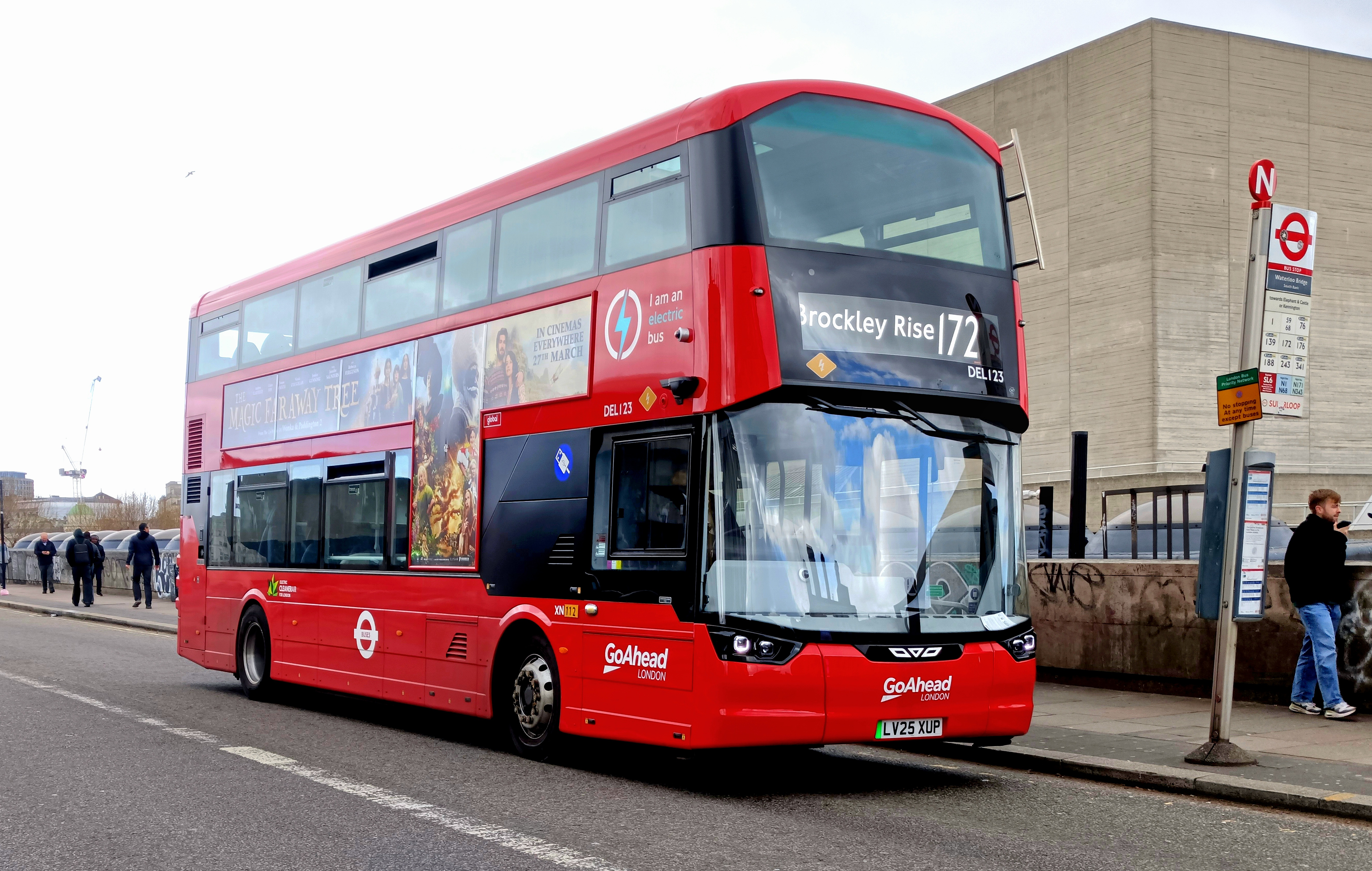
- Wright StreetDeck Electroliner on route 172 on Waterloo Bridge in March 2026
- Parent: Go-Ahead London
- Founded: 1 April 1989
- Headquarters: Merton
- Service area: South London
- Service type: Bus services
- Depots: 6
- Website: www.goaheadlondon.com

London Central is a bus operator brand under London General Transport Services Limited, trading as Go-Ahead London. It is a subsidiary of Go-Ahead London and primarily operates services in South London under contract to Transport for London.

== History ==
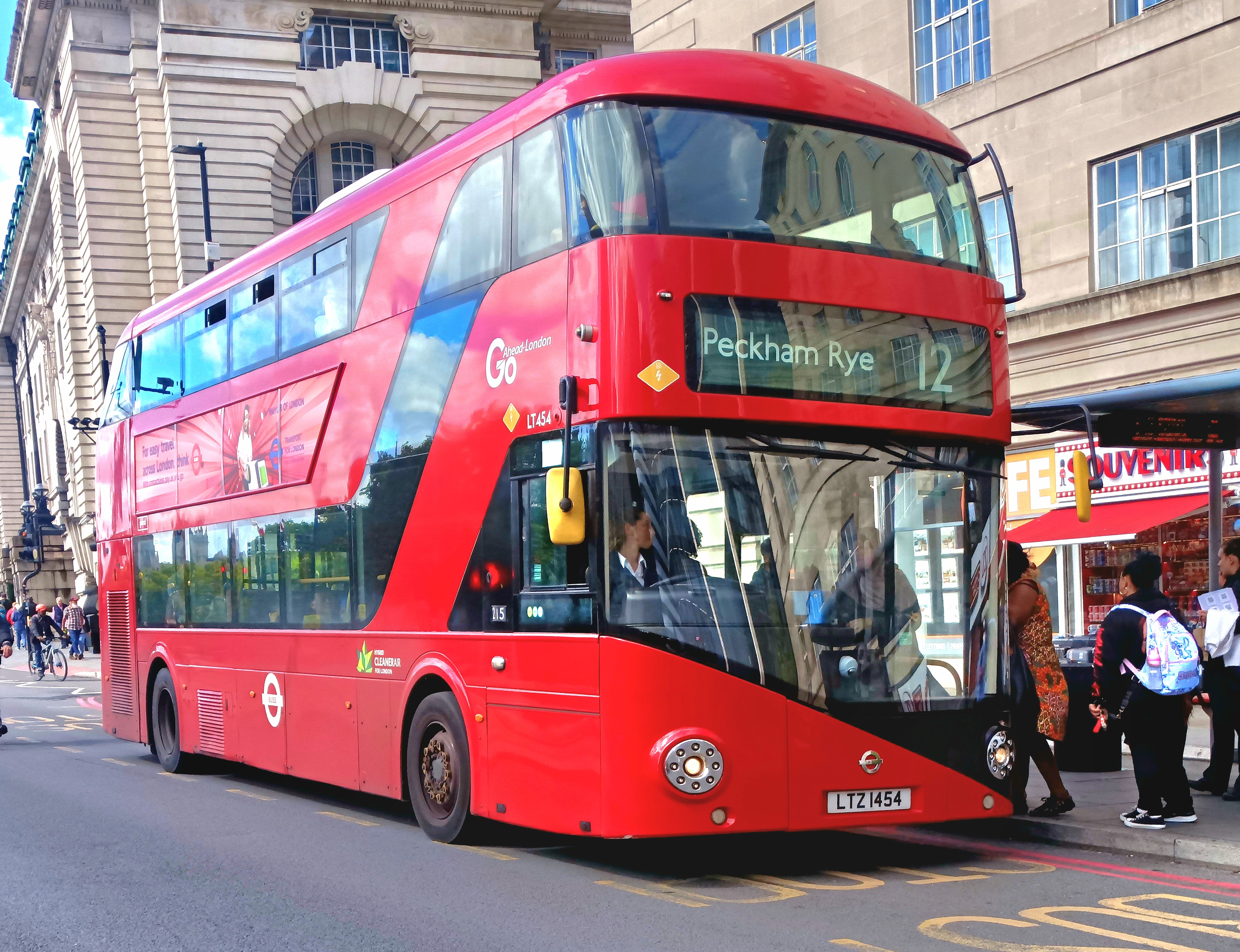
New Routemaster on route 12 at Westminster

In April 1989, London Buses was divided into 11 separate business units, one of which was the London Central Bus Company. As part of the privatisation of London bus services, in September 1994, London Central was sold to the Go-Ahead Group for £23.8 million (equivalent to £50,218,000 in 2025).

In August 2008, the Go-Ahead Group's London bus operations all adopted the Go-Ahead London trading name, although the individual company names are still applied beneath the Go-Ahead London logo on most buses. London Central was among the three other Go-Ahead London operations to be brought under the London General license in early 2017, however as before, the London Central name was retained on company logos.

== Garages ==
London Central operates six bus garages.

=== Bexleyheath (BX) ===
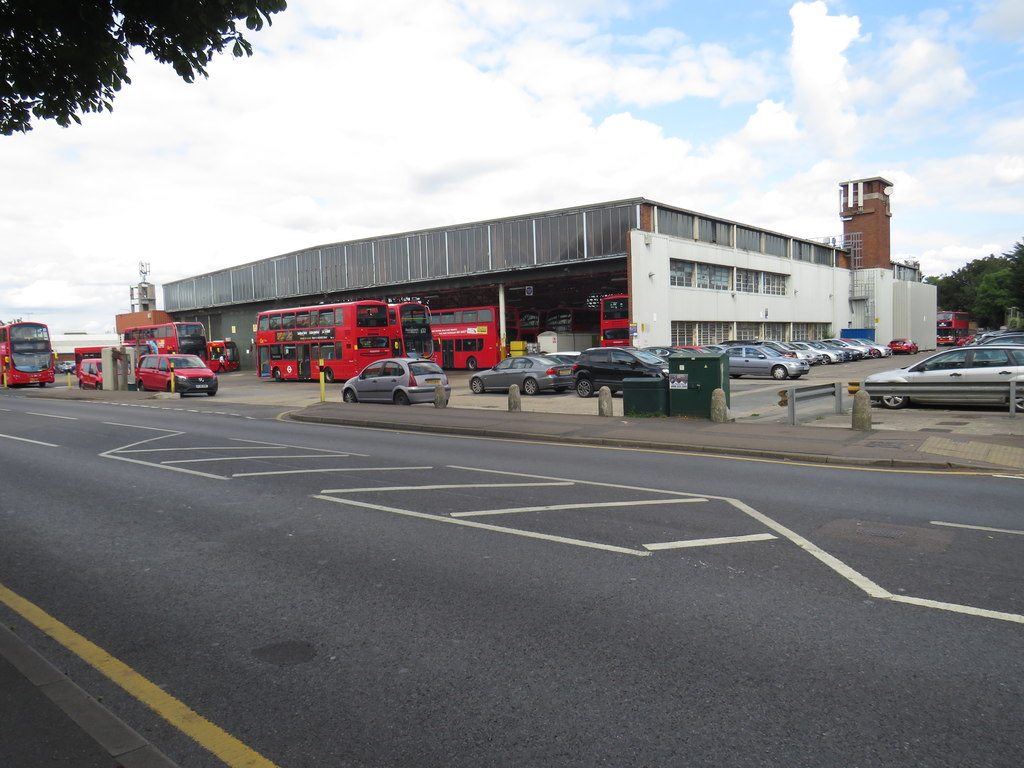
Bexleyheath garage from Erith Road, July 2019

Bexleyheath garage operates routes 89, 99, 132, 269, 401, 486, B11, B12, B13, B15 and B16.

==== History ====
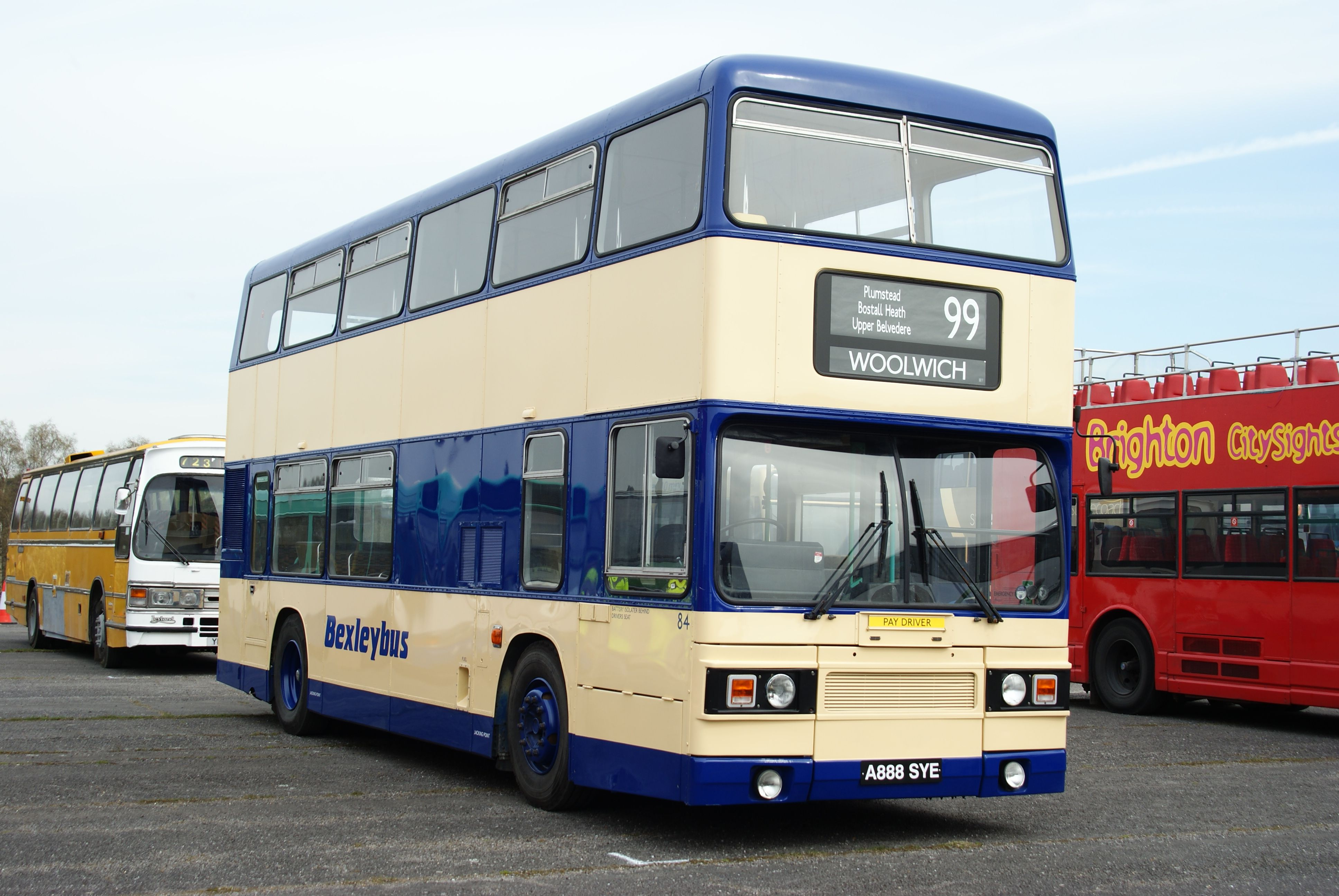
Preserved Bexleybus Leyland Titan at Wisley Airfield in April 2010

Built as a trolleybus depot by the London Passenger Transport Board, Bexleyheath was the only new garage built for trolleybuses, opening on 10 November 1935. The garage's trolleybuses were among the first to be withdrawn from service by London Transport in favour of motorbuses, with routes 696 and 698 replaced by bus routes 96 and an extended route 229 respectively.

Bexleyheath garage is a large and imposing building, slightly set back from the main Erith Road to enable parking on the forecourt. This arrangement was used for the terminus for route 122. In August 1986, Bexleyheath was found to be one of a number of London Regional Transport (LRT) bus garages surplus to requirements as a result of bus route tendering reducing the LRT bus fleet, and as a result, Bexleyheath garage was closed, with work transferred to the Catford, Plumstead and Sidcup garages. The site, however, was retained by LRT for further development.

On 16 January 1988, Bexleyheath garage reopened under the guise of Bexleybus, a low-cost unit set up by London Buses in preparation for the deregulation of London's bus services. Bexleybus had a varied fleet of 107 buses painted in a cream and blue livery, ranging from Robin Hood-bodied Iveco Daily and integrally-constructed MCW Metrorider minibuses to ex-LRT Daimler Fleetlines and Leyland Nationals as well as 28 new Northern Counties-bodied Leyland Olympians leased to the operator. The move to set up the new company to tender for routes backfired, with low maintenance, supervisory and administrative staffing at Bexleyheath garage resulting in frequent service delays and vehicle breakdowns. As a result of the disruption, routes 422 and 492 were transferred to Boro'line London in October 1988, and in the next round of London Buses route tendering in September 1990, only route B16 was awarded to Bexleybus, whilst London Central won nine routes.

London Central took control of Bexleyheath garage and its routes in January 1991, with the Bexleybus name being dropped and vehicles being returned to their lessors. In recent years, the garage has had a good utilisation figure, with up to 139 in 2001 parked at the garage necessitating parking in the rear yard and the forecourt. Bexleyheath also houses one of London Central's iBus hubs, controlling routes for Bexleyheath, Morden Wharf, New Cross, and Peckham garages, as well as Go-Ahead London's private hire and rail replacement fleet, the former of which is painted in the style of the former London General company.

In 2022, Bexleyheath became the first bus garage in London to be equipped for 'opportunity charge' battery electric bus operation, whereby the bus is charged while terminating before starting its next journey. This was introduced on route 132 whose eastern terminus is at the garage. A gantry was installed at the garage connecting with a pantograph on the top of the bus, and on 9 July 2022, a fleet of Alexander Dennis Enviro400EVs began to enter service on route 132.

=== Camberwell (Q) ===
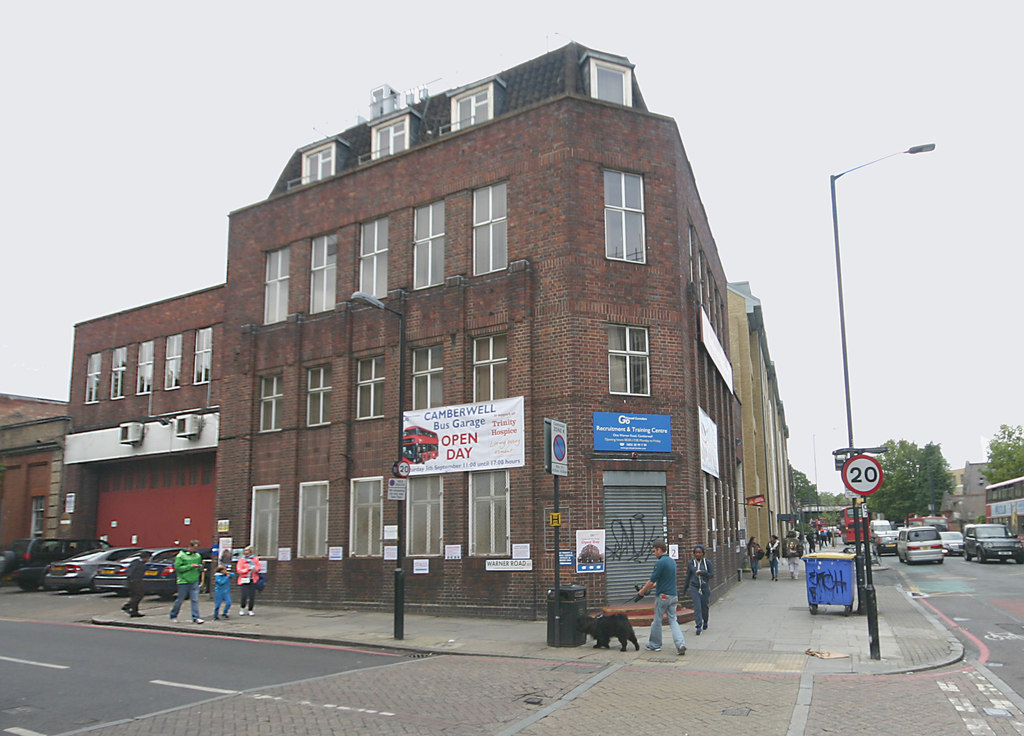
The former head office of Camberwell bus garage on Camberwell New Road, now used as Go-Ahead London's training school, September 2015

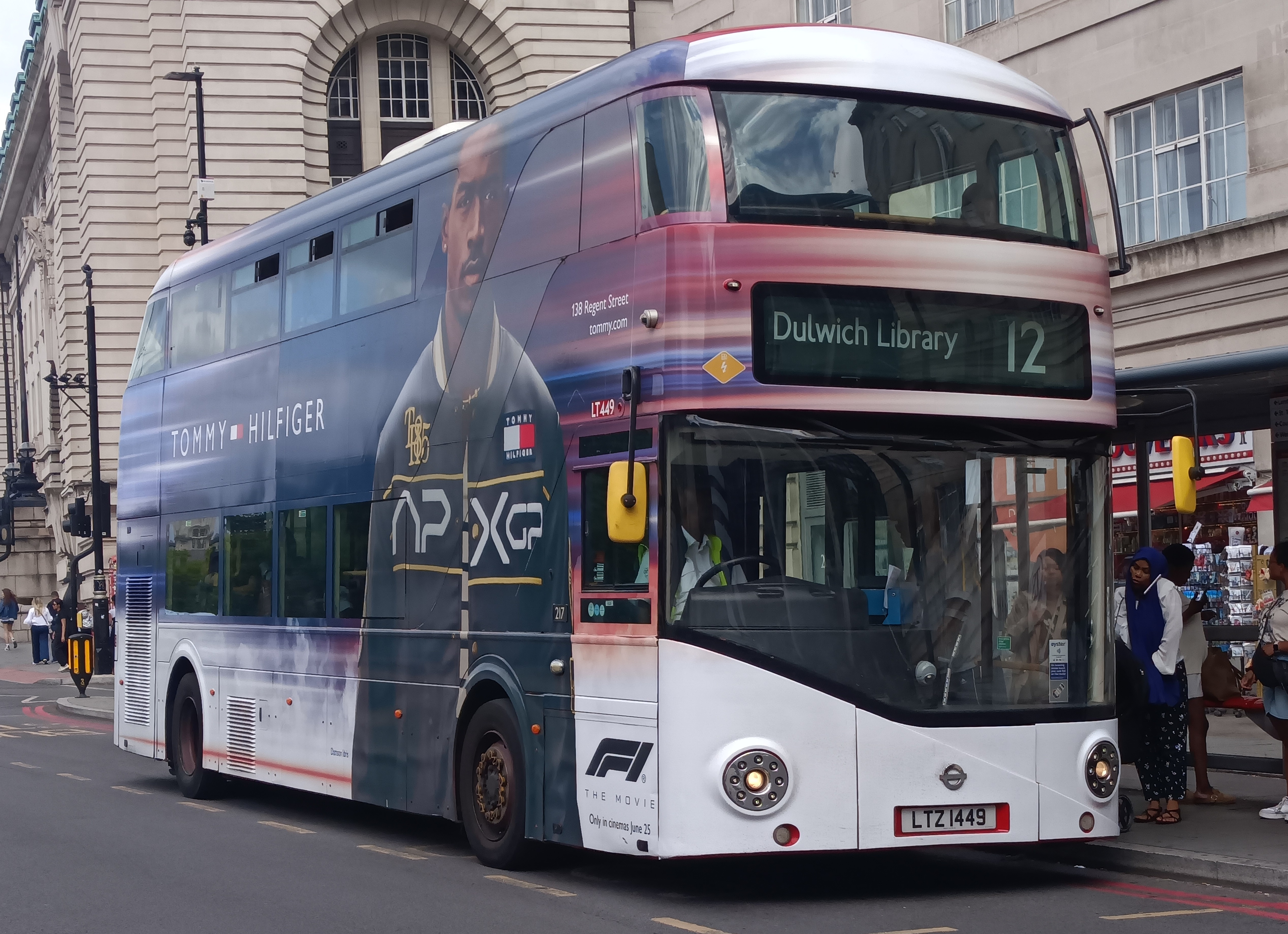
New Routemaster wearing an advertising wrap for Tommy Hilfiger on route 12, one of the oldest bus routes in London, is operated out of Camberwell garage

Camberwell garage operates routes 1, 12, 35, 40, 42, 100, 108, 176, 185, 188, 355, 360, 484 and N1.

==== History ====
Although opened by the London General Omnibus Company in June 1914, Camberwell garage was not used as a bus garage until 1919 as it had been requisitioned by the War Department during World War I. During World War II, Camberwell garage was bombed twice: the first bombing occurred on the night of 31 October 1940, resulting in four buses being destroyed and 13 seriously damaged, followed on 16 April 1941 by an incendiary bomb being dropped on the garage, destroying one bus. During the war, Camberwell garage was equipped for bus body overhauling in 1940, and a fleet of sixteen buses were converted to run on coal-fuelled producer gas to combat fuel rationing.

During the early 1950s, Camberwell garage underwent heavy modernisation, which saw the garage's welfare and operational block reconstructed and bus parking area extended. The new building also incorporated a newly developed pit and workshop layout in a separate self-contained block, all being grouped together in order to reduce the effort required by maintenance staff. As a result, Camberwell was able to undertake heavy maintenance for both itself and Walworth garage as part of an engineering grouping of London Transport bus garages.

The allocation at Camberwell decreased slightly over the years from 165 in 1952, until the closure of Walworth garage in 1985 increased the allocation to 142. When London Regional Transport's bus operations were split on 1 April 1989, Walworth was designated as the head office for the London Central Bus Company. Between September 1992 and early 1993, Camberwell garage took delivery of 24 Optare Spectra bodied DAF DB250s to replace AEC Routemasters on route 3, these being the last new buses delivered to London Buses before privatisation.

The purchase of London General by the Go-Ahead Group in 1996 saw the merger of the two companies' operations, resulting in London Central's head office moving away from Camberwell. The office building was left mothballed until 2001, when it was refurbished and opened as Go-Ahead's London recruitment and training centre. This centre was refurbished and reopened again in March 2019 as a facility to train over 1,000 bus drivers a year under a new apprenticeship programme, also expanding its scope to drivers working for the wider Go-Ahead Group.

Camberwell garage is today one of the United Kingdom's largest bus garages, having a vehicle authorisation of 242 and employing 650 drivers as of 2019. After having previously been the garage for Mercedes-Benz Citaro articulated buses on the route between November 2004 and November 2011, New Routemasters were introduced at Camberwell on routes 12 and 68 between 2015 and 2016, and 42 charging points were installed at the garage during 2021 to facilitate the introduction of Alexander Dennis Enviro200EV battery electric buses on routes 100, 360 and 484.

=== Morden Wharf (MG) ===
Superloop route SL11, operated using New Routemasters, is based from Morden Wharf garage

Morden Wharf garage operates routes 51, 178, 244, 286, 291, 386, 469, 601, 624, 625, 658, N472 and SL11.

==== History ====
On 29 July 2017, Morden Wharf garage commenced operations at the site of a sugar refinery on the Greenwich Peninsula after London General's Mandela Way garage closed, receiving an official opening on 12 March 2018. Housing 125 buses and 310 drivers, Morden Wharf initially operated routes 108, 129, 180, 188, 225, 286 and N1.

=== New Cross (NX) ===
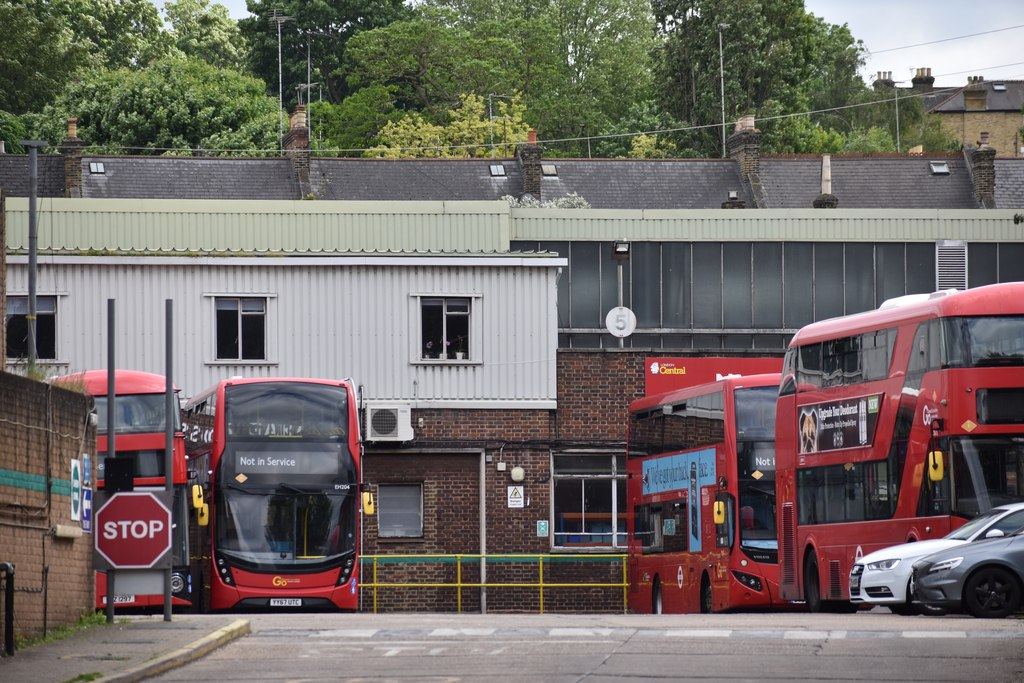
New Cross garage forecourt, June 2024

New Cross garage operates routes 21, 36, 108, 171, 172, 321, 343, 436, 453, N21, N89, N136, N171, N343 and P4.

==== History ====
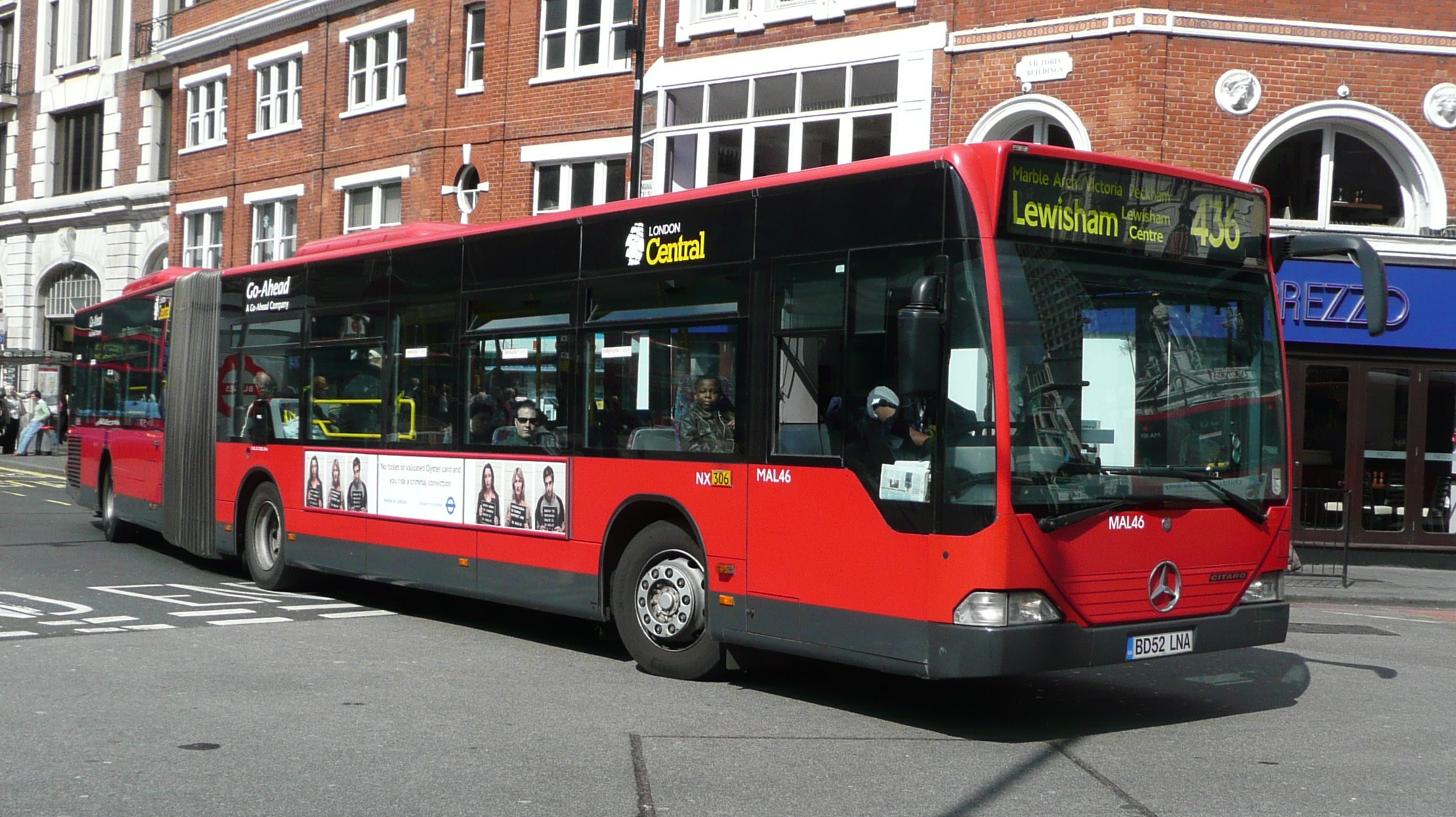
Mercedes-Benz O530G Citaros, allocated to route 436, were operated out of New Cross garage

Said to be the largest of London's bus garages with space for over 300 buses, New Cross garage was originally a tram depot and opened in 1906. In 1952 with the trams withdrawn, the depot was converted into a bus garage. The garage allocation has fluctuated over the years, from 191 in 1966 to 132 in 2001; New Cross has never been even close to its capacity due to the close proximity of other garages, but has at various times been used to store surplus vehicles.

New Cross was a garage where two special bus services were based. In 1972, New Cross ran a preserved ex-Tilling ST-type AEC Regent I on London Transport's new route 100 sightseeing service, running between Horse Guards Avenue, Whitehall, Trafalgar Square, the West End of London and the Victoria Embankment; this service was revived during 1977 as part of commemorations for the Silver Jubilee of Elizabeth II. The second service, launched in January 2000 as part of the 'Millennium Busway' project, used a fleet of 17 East Lancs Myllennium bodied DAF SB220s, three of which were LPG gas-powered, for Millennium Dome shuttle services M1 and M2, the former of which was relaunched with the same buses as route 486 in early 2001.

On 18 February 1996, a London Central Leyland Titan based from New Cross garage and working on route 171 was destroyed when a bomb detonated prematurely in the lower deck as it drove along Aldwych, killing Provisional IRA member Edward O'Brien and injuring eight others inside and outside the bus. Driver Robert Newitt, one of three seriously injured, was left permanently deafened by the explosion.

In February 2003, New Cross garage began operating 30 Mercedes-Benz Citaro articulated buses on route 436, the third such London bus route to be converted to articulated buses; In January 2005, New Cross garage withdrew its last AEC Routemasters when route 36 was curtailed from Lewisham to New Cross Gate in favour of the 436 and ahead of the introduction of the congestion charge, with one-person operated double-decker buses taking over on the 36. The 436's articulated Citaros were themselves withdrawn and replaced by double-deckers on 21 November 2011.

=== Peckham (PM) ===
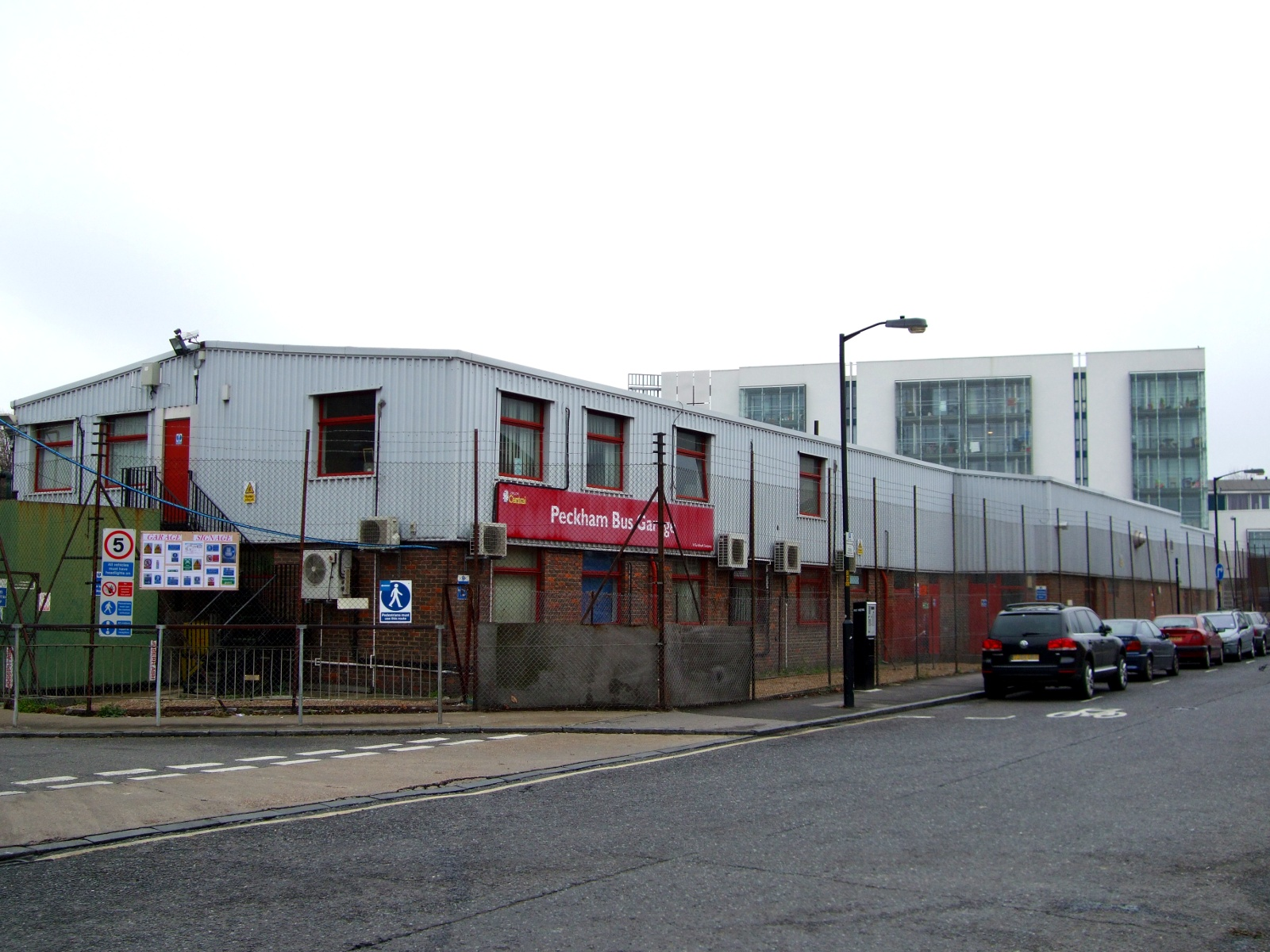
Peckham bus garage from Blackpool Road, November 2008

Peckham garage operates routes 37, 78, 197 and P12.

==== History ====
After the original Peckham bus garage, which opened in 1951, was closed in 1994 due to both operational expenses and concerns about the garage's ferro-concrete roof, London Central took over a local authority maintenance depot and opened a new Peckham bus garage at the site with a capacity for 75 buses.

In January 2000, Peckham garage put London's first Volvo low-floor double-decker buses, in the form of part of an order of 46 Alexander ALX400 bodied Volvo B7TLs, into service on route 63.

Peckham won Bus Garage of the Year in 2004, although this turned out to be a poisoned chalice for the garage, losing almost half of its work including routes 381 and P13 in the next year's tender awards.

=== Sydenham (SM) ===
Sydenham garage operates routes 126, 162, 227, 322, 352, 354 and 450.

==== History ====
Sydenham garage opened during September 2025 and received 13 Alexander Dennis Enviro100EV battery electric buses for route 322, making it Go-Ahead London's 14th garage to operate electric buses.

== Fleet ==
As of December 2019, London Central had a peak vehicle requirement of 676 buses.
