= Vauxhall station =

London Underground and railway station

Vauxhall
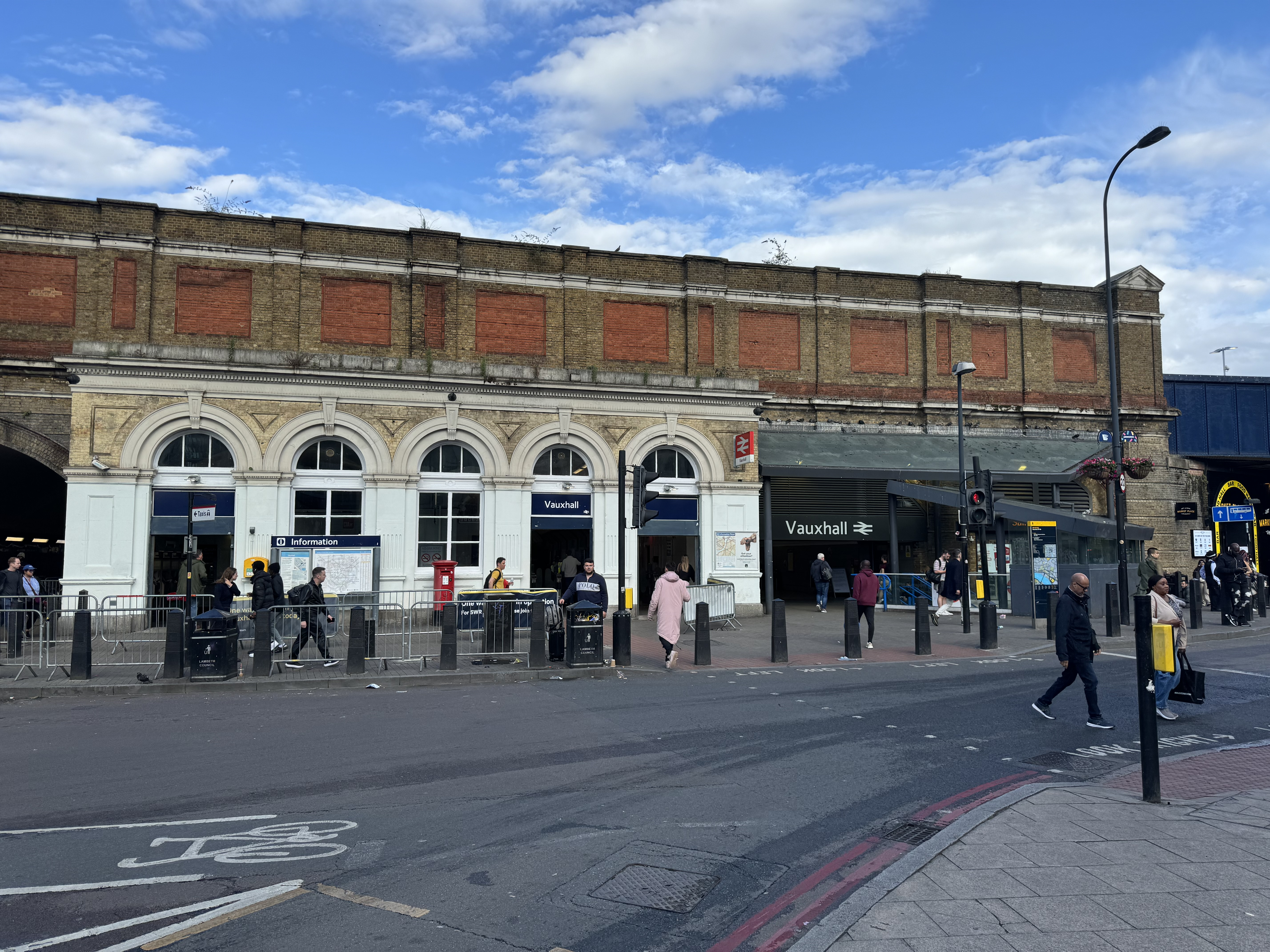
- Station entrance to National Rail Vauxhall station, July 2024
- Interactive map of Vauxhall

General information
- Location: Vauxhall
- Local authority: London Borough of Lambeth
- Managed by: South Western Railway
- Station code: VXH
- DfT category: B
- Number of platforms: 8 National Rail; 2 London Underground
- Accessible: Yes
- Fare zone: 1 and 2

London Underground annual entry and exit
- 2021: ▼13.62 million
- 2022: ▲20.88 million
- 2023: ▼20.77 million
- 2024: ▲21.21 million
- 2025: ▲21.95 million

National Rail annual entry and exit
- 2020–21: ▼4.987 million
- 2021–22: ▲11.651 million
- 2022–23: ▲13.012 million
- 2023–24: ▲13.932 million
- 2024–25: ▲15.534 million

Key dates
- 11 July 1848: Opened (LSWR)
- 23 July 1971: Opened (London Underground)

Other information
- External links: TfL station info page; Departures; Facilities
- Coordinates: 51.4854°N 0.1229°W

Vauxhall (/ˈvɒksɔːl/, VOK-sawl) is a National Rail, London Underground and London Buses interchange station in South London. It is at the Vauxhall Cross road junction opposite the southern approach to Vauxhall Bridge over the River Thames in the district of Vauxhall. The mainline station is run by the South Western Railway and is the first stop on the South West Main Line from London Waterloo towards Clapham Junction and the south-west. The Underground station is on the Victoria line and the station is close to St George Wharf Pier for river services.

The station was opened by the London and South Western Railway in 1848 as Vauxhall Bridge station. It was rebuilt in 1856 after a large fire, and given its current name in 1863. In the early 20th century, Vauxhall saw significant use as a stop for trains delivering milk from across the country into London. The tube station opened in 1971 as part of the Victoria line extension towards Brixton, while the bus station opened in 2004. It remains an important local interchange on the London transport network.

== Location ==
The station sits just to the east of Vauxhall Bridge, on a viaduct with eight platforms, straddling South Lambeth Road and South Lambeth Place, alongside Vauxhall Cross. On the National Rail network it is the next station on the South West Main Line along from London Waterloo, 1 mile 29 chains (2.2 km) to the south-west. On the London Underground it is on the Victoria line between Stockwell and Pimlico stations.. The station is on the boundary of London fare zone 1 and 2 and, although a through station, it is classed as a central London terminus for ticketing purposes.

Vauxhall bus station is at ground level, across the road from the railway station. It has a photovoltaic roof supplying much of its electricity, and caters for around 2,000 buses per day.

== History ==
=== Mainline station ===
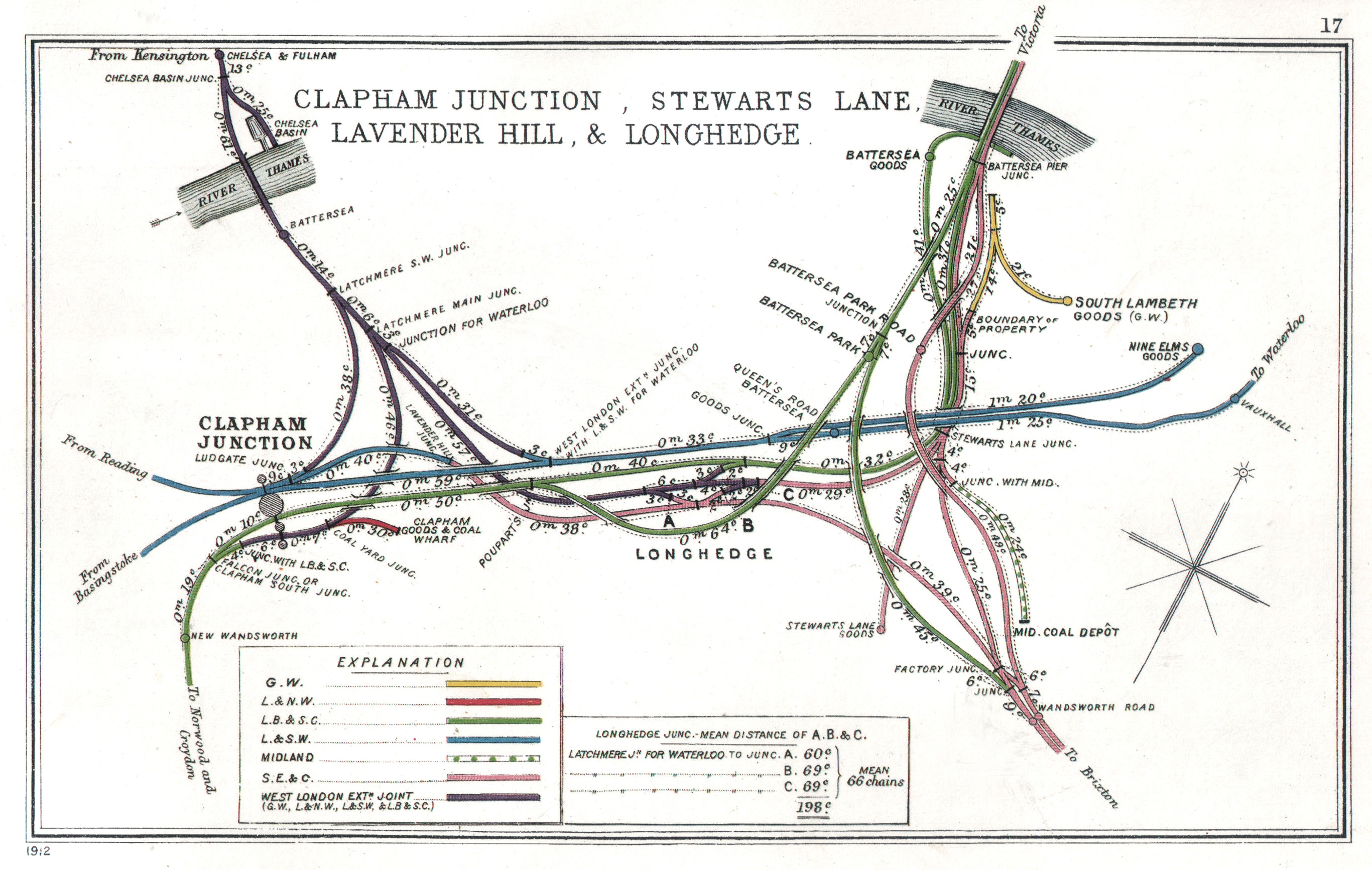
A 1912 Railway Clearing House map of lines around Clapham Junction. Vauxhall station is at the extreme right of this map

The station is incorporated within the Nine Elms to Waterloo Viaduct. It was opened by the London and South Western Railway (LSWR) as "Vauxhall Bridge Station" on 11 July 1848 when the main line was extended from Nine Elms to Waterloo, then known as "Waterloo Bridge Station". The viaduct was constructed to minimize property disturbances; nevertheless some 700 properties were demolished extending the line past Nine Elms and through Vauxhall.

In the period when Vauxhall was opened, there was no way for an inspector to move through the length of a train to check tickets, so it was used as a ticket stop, like several other stations. Having arrived at Vauxhall, the train would stop for as long as necessary while all tickets could be examined and collected.

On 13 April 1856, the station caught fire and was almost totally destroyed. The line was quickly repaired and services through to Waterloo resumed without much delay. After being rebuilt, the station was renamed "Vauxhall" in 1863. (Note: A station in Birmingham called "Vauxhall" had been opened by the London and North Western Railway on 1 March 1869; it was renamed "Vauxhall and Duddeston" on 1 November 1889 and "Duddeston" on 6 May 1974.) In the same year, the LSWR widened the main line through the station. Vauxhall was remodelled in 1936, which included an overhaul of the signalling system up to Waterloo.

==== Milk trains ====
In 1921, United Dairies opened a major creamery and milk bottling plant opposite Vauxhall station. Subsequently, milk trains regularly stopped at the station. The regular daily milk train was from Torrington, but services from all over the West Country would stop at Clapham Junction in the evening, and reduce their length by half so that they did not block Vauxhall station while unloading. They would then proceed to Vauxhall, and pull into the Up Windsor Local platform, where a discharge pipe was provided to the creamery on the other side of the road. There was also pedestrian access from below the station, under the road to the depot, in the tunnel where the pipeline ran. Unloaded trains would then proceed to Waterloo, where they would reverse and return to Clapham Junction to pick up the other half of the train. The procedure was then repeated, so that the entire milk train was unloaded between the end of evening peak traffic and the start of the following morning.

==== Modern developments ====
In 2017, work began to modernise the station layout and reduce congestion as part of an £800 million works programme to improve access to Waterloo. The existing lift was replaced and a new staircase was added between platforms 7 and 8 and the concourse.

=== London Underground ===
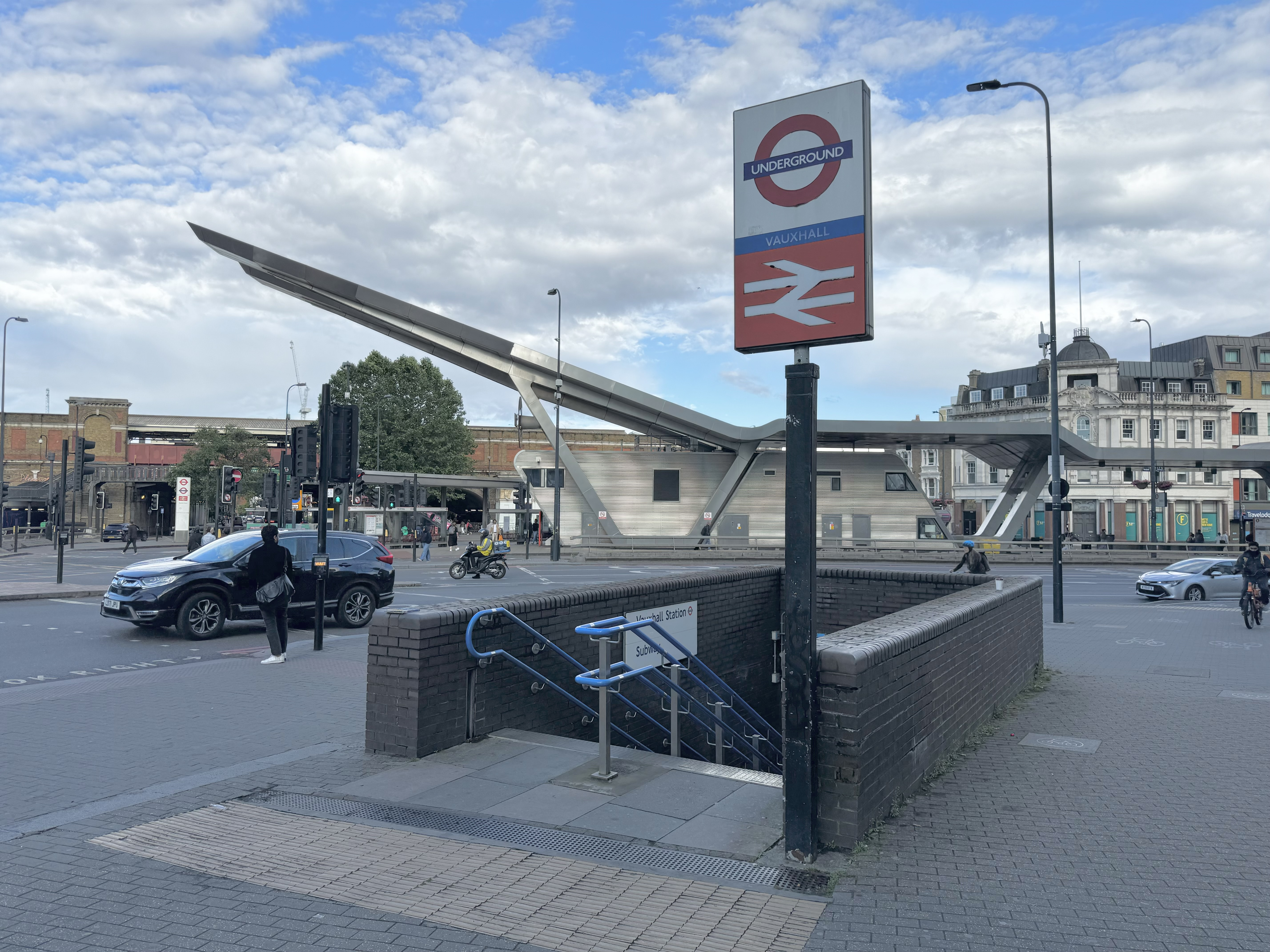
The subway entrance to Vauxhall tube station, July 2024

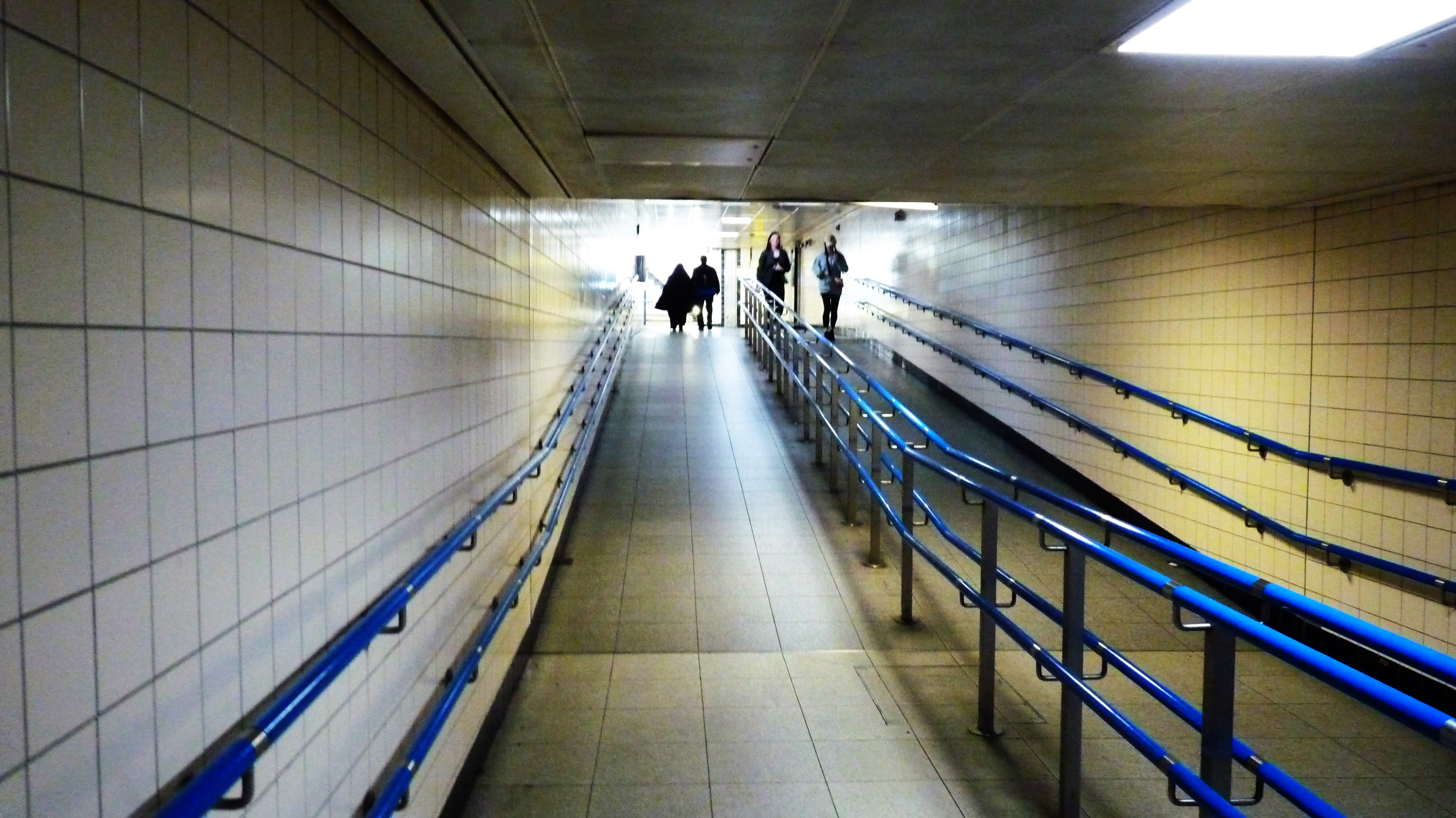

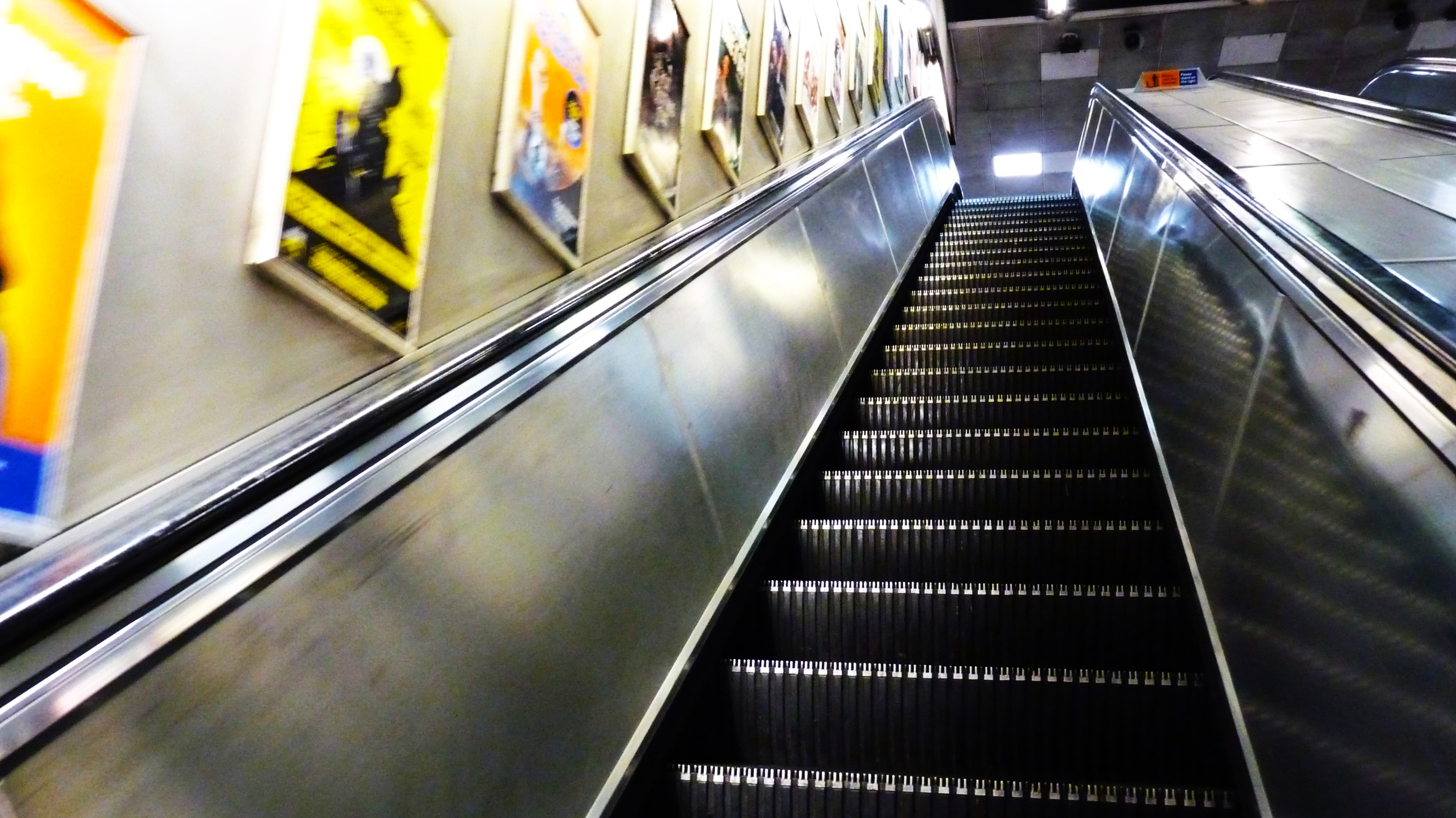

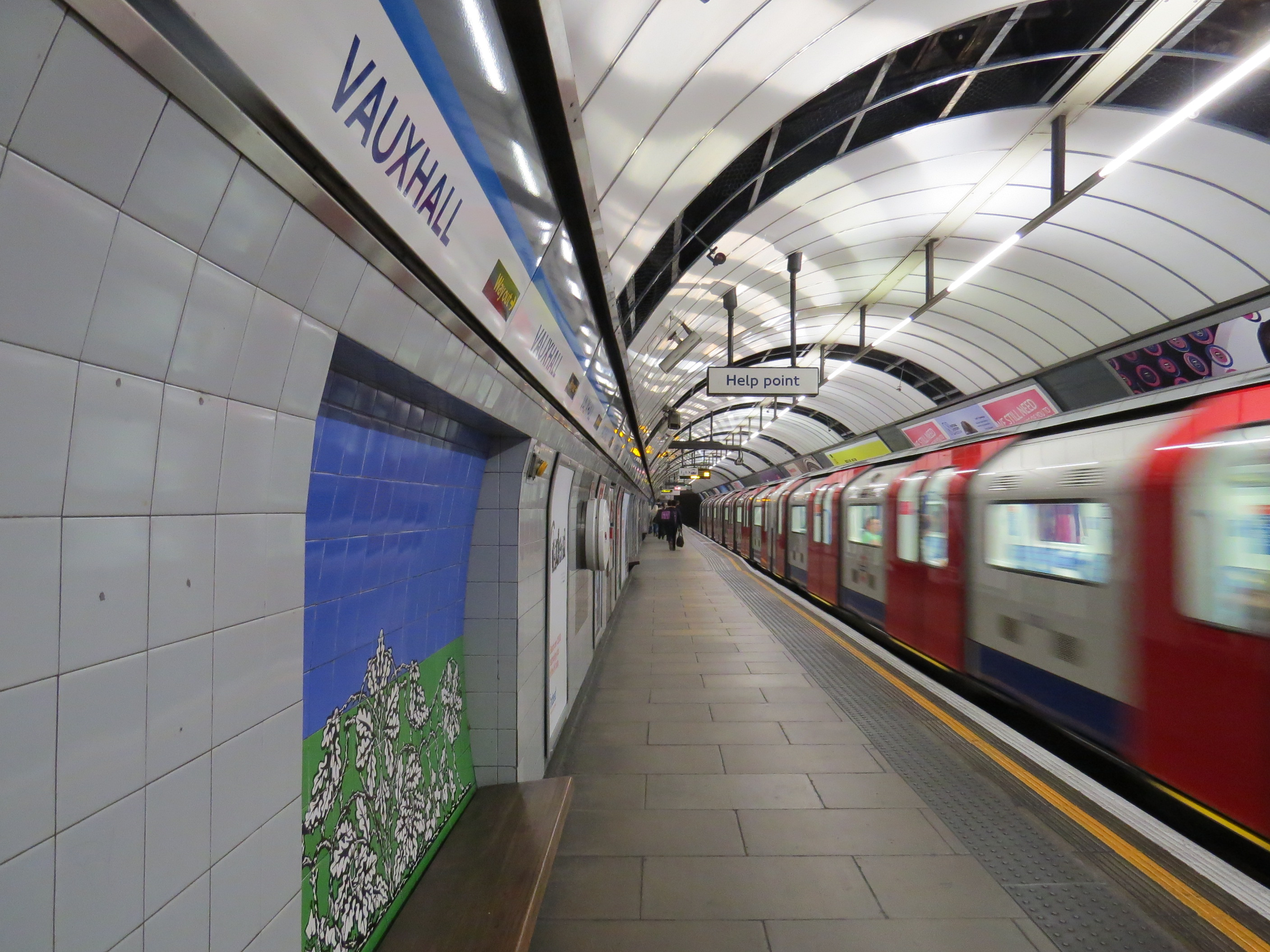
Vauxhall Underground station

The first proposed underground station at Vauxhall was as part of the West and South London Junction Railway. The line was intended to connect Paddington to Oval via Vauxhall, crossing the River Thames slightly downstream of Vauxhall Bridge. It was rejected in January 1901 for failing to comply with Standing Orders and giving correct notice of eviction, and the plans were quietly shelved. Another abandoned scheme to connect Cannon Street with Wimbledon would have seen an interchange at Vauxhall; these plans were scrapped in 1902 owing to lack of funds.

The current deep tube London Underground station is on the Victoria line, which was the first major post-war underground project in Central London. The line was given approval to be extended from Victoria underneath the Thames to Vauxhall (and onwards to Brixton) in March 1966. To construct the escalator shaft, the ground beneath it was frozen with brine. The station platforms were designed by Design Research Unit and decorated with a motif from the 19th-century Vauxhall Gardens, designed by George Smith. At the same time, Vauxhall Cross road junction was rebuilt in order to accommodate the new Underground station. The Underground station was opened on 23 July 1971 by Princess Alexandra, as part of the extension of the Victoria line to Brixton.

In October 1982, the first automated ticketing system on the Underground was installed at Vauxhall on an experimental basis. The two machines were a "Tenfare" which sold the ten most popular single tickets, and "Allfare" which supplied single and return tickets to any tube station. The experiment ran until July 1983, and was subsequently used in the design of the rollout of the Underground ticketing system across the network.

In 2005, the existing fixed staircase between the two escalators down to platform level was replaced by a new escalator. Installed by Metronet as part of the Tube Private Public Partnership, the escalator was installed due to the high numbers of passengers using the station.

In the late 2000s, one potential option for extending the Northern line to Battersea was a route via Vauxhall station. Despite the benefit of connecting to the Victoria line and National Rail services, the option had a significantly higher cost than others, and increased the potential for increased overcrowding at the station. A route via Nine Elms was chosen instead. In the mid 2010s, the Underground station was upgraded and refurbished at a cost of £36m, as part of the Vauxhall Nine Elms Battersea regeneration project. Lifts were installed to provide step-free access to the Victoria line.

=== Bus ===
The bus station opened on 4 December 2004. It was designed by Arup Associates and features a distinctive metallic design constructed out of stainless steel. The station has been criticised for its proximity to the heavy traffic around Vauxhall Cross. In 2011, Transport for London announced they would demolish the bus station and construct a "linear walkway" instead. This was scrapped, but in 2017, they revived the demolition plans as part of general improvements in the area following support from Lambeth Council. The rebuilding is expected to take place between 2019 and 2021. Kate Hoey, member of parliament for Vauxhall criticised the proposals in 2017, calling them a "stitch up".

== Services ==
=== National Rail ===
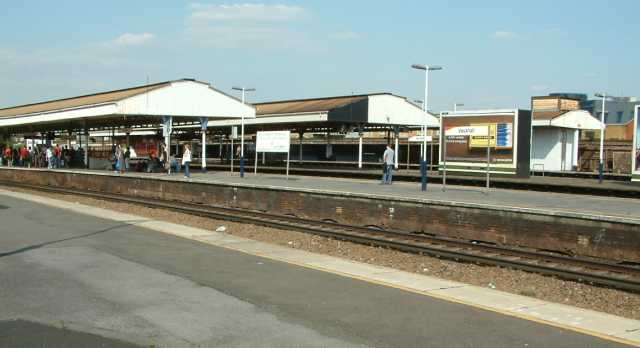
Vauxhall railway station platforms from the western end.

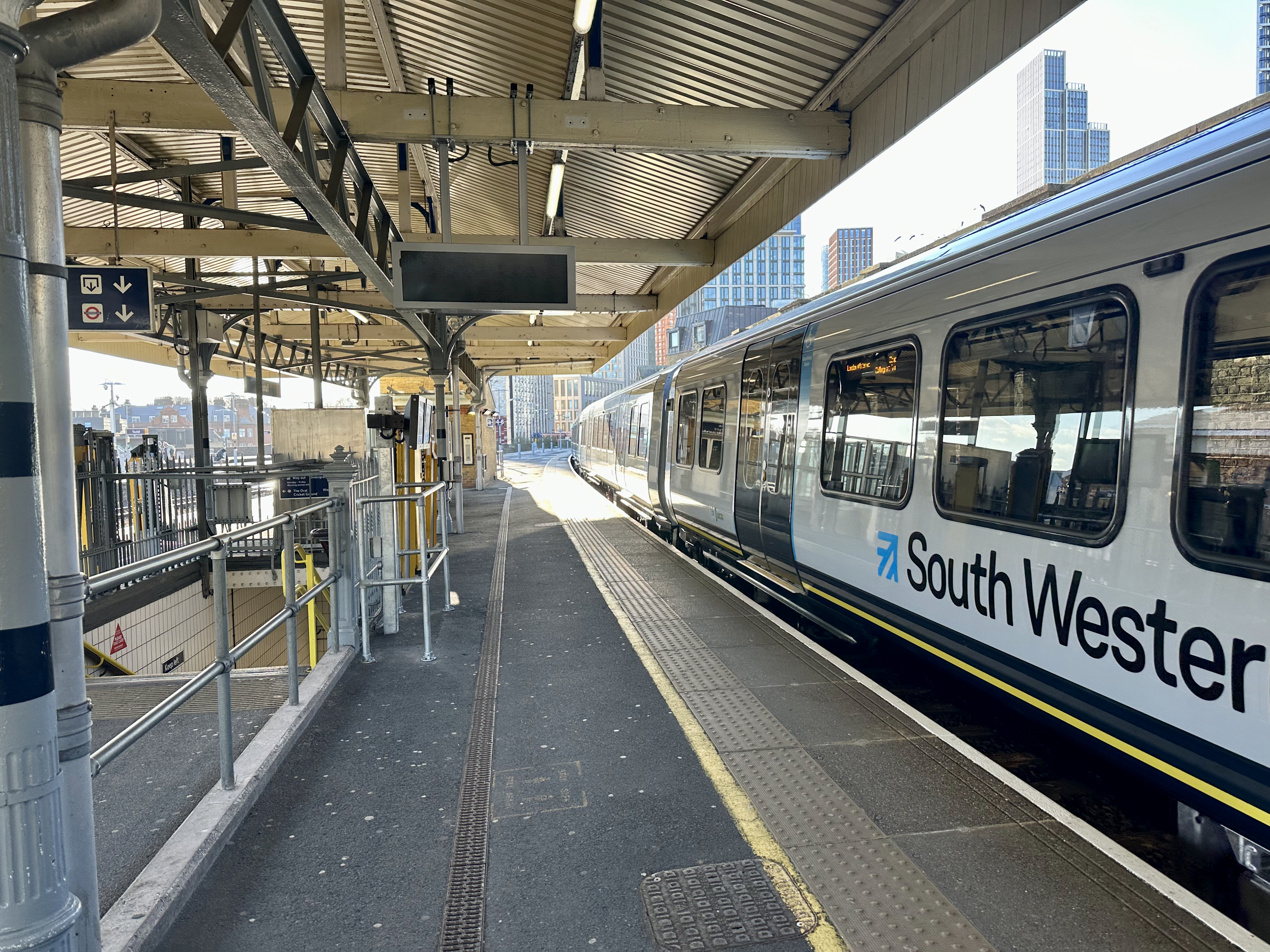
A South Western Railway Class 701 EMU bound for London Waterloo at Vauxhall

Vauxhall railway station is served by the South Western Railway to and from London Waterloo. Approximately 460 trains travel between the stations each day.

There are eigh platforms at the station, arranged into fur islands, which, from north to south:

- Platforms 1 and 2 on Waterloo–Reading line towards London Waterloo
- Platforms 3 and 4 on Waterloo–Reading line towards Reading
- Platform 5 on South West Main Line fast line towards London Waterloo
- Platform 6 on South West Main Line fast line towards Weymouth
- Platform 7 on South West Main Line slow line towards London Waterloo
- Platform 8 on South West Main Line slow line towards Weymouth

In practice, platforms 5 and 6 are not used for passenger calls as fast trains do not call at this station.

The typical off-peak service in trains per hour (tph) is:

- 20 tph to London Waterloo
- 2 tph to Chessington South
- 2 tph to Hampton Court
- 1 tph to Dorking via Epsom
- 3 tph to Guildford (one of these runs via Epsom and two run via Cobham)
- 2 tph to Woking via Weybridge
- 2 tph to Shepperton via Kingston
- 2 tph to Teddington via Kingston, returning to London Waterloo via Richmond
- 2 tph to Teddington via Richmond, returning to London Waterloo via Kingston
- 2 tph to Weybridge via Hounslow
- 2 tph to Windsor & Eton Riverside

=== London Underground ===
Vauxhall tube station is served by the Victoria line between Stockwell and Pimlico with a peak time service frequency of 36 trains per hour, or around one every 100 seconds.

=== Connections ===
Day and nighttime London Buses routes serve the adjacent bus station.

London River Services are available from nearby St George Wharf Pier. The service was opened in September 2011 by the Mayor of London, Boris Johnson, with the aim of expanding boat transport along the Thames by 20%. A service runs approximately every 40 minutes to the City of London and Canary Wharf.

| Preceding station | National Rail | Following station |
|---|---|---|
| London Waterloo | South Western Railway South West Main Line | Queenstown Road or Clapham Junction |
| Preceding station | LUL | Following station |
| Stockwell towards Brixton | Victoria line | Pimlico towards Walthamstow Central |

== Incidents ==
- On 11 September 1880, a light engine collided with a service from Waterloo to Hampton. Five passengers were killed.
- On 29 August 1912, a light engine collided with a rake of nine carriages. One passenger was killed and 43 were injured.
- On 20 September 1934, two electric suburban trains collided at Vauxhall. The driver of one train and a passenger were taken to St Thomas' Hospital for treatment.
- On 9 October 2000, an untrained student worker was hit by a train near Vauxhall station while unsupervised. An inquest in May 2002 returned a verdict of unlawful killing.
- On 5 May 2016, a fire broke out in one of the signal cables at Vauxhall station. Services from Waterloo through the station were cancelled and the next major down station, Clapham Junction was closed as an overcrowding measure.

== Name ==
The name Vauxhall is phonetically similar to the Russian word for a railway station, вокзал (vokzal). One theory for this similarity is that Tsar Nicholas I visited Britain in the mid-19th century to study the railway network. At the time, every train on the South Western Railway called at Vauxhall as a ticket stop. From this, the Tsar concluded that Vauxhall was a major transport interchange, and the word was introduced as the generic term in Russian.
