= Sainsbury's, Greenwich =

Sainsbury's Greenwich
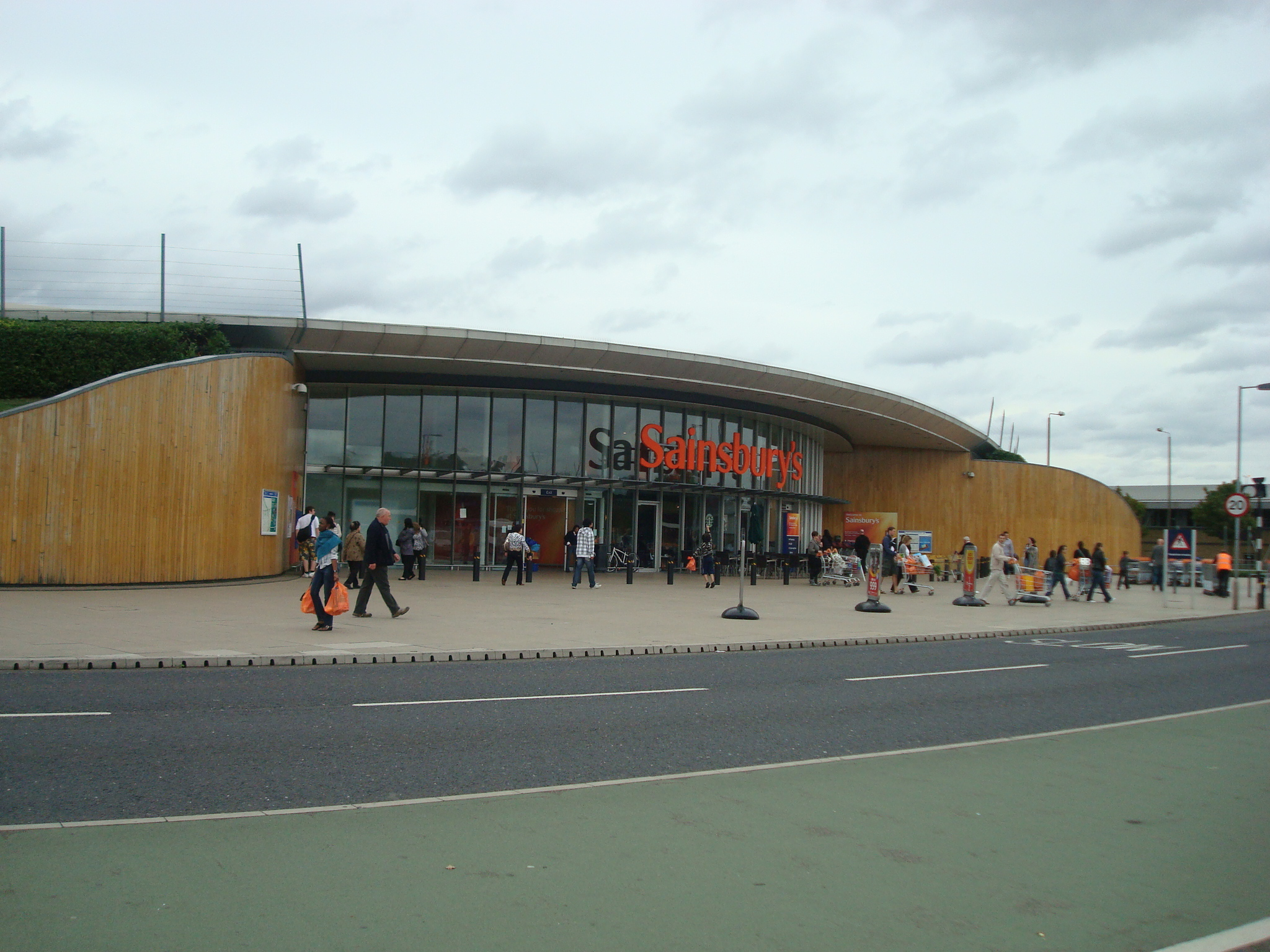
- Sainsbury's Greenwich in September 2010
- Interactive map of the Sainsbury's Greenwich area

General information
- Architectural style: Futurist; Sustainable; Bioclimatic
- Location: 55 Bugsby's Way, Greenwich Peninsula, SE10, Royal Borough of Greenwich, London, United Kingdom
- Coordinates: 51°29′24″N 0°01′00″E
- Opened: 14 September 1999
- Closed: 24 June 2015
- Demolished: 2016
- Cost: £13 million
- Client: Sainsbury's

Technical details
- Floor area: 55,000 sq ft (5,100 m^{2})

Design and construction
- Architect: Chetwoods Architects

Other information
- Public transit access: London Buses: Route 108, route 129, route 132, route 161, route 472, route 486 Underground: North Greenwich (0.92 miles; 1.48 km); Rail: Westcombe Park (0.39 miles; 0.63 km) DLR: Cutty Sark (1.31 miles; 2.11 km)

Sainsbury's, Greenwich, also known as the Sainsbury's Millennium Store, was a Sainsbury's supermarket building at 55 Bugsby's Way, Greenwich Peninsula, London. Opening in 1999 as Sainsbury's flagship store, the building design incorporated environmentally conscious features and gained critical acclaim, being shortlisted for the 2000 Stirling Prize. It was billed as "the first Green supermarket in the world".

In 2014, planning permission to demolish the store was approved by Greenwich London Borough Council with Sainsbury's moving to a new site in Charlton. After an application for listed status failed, demolition began in 2016 and an IKEA store was built on the site.

== Background ==
Previously the Greenwich Peninsula was an industrial area, before being marked for redevelopment in the 1990s. Sainsbury's bid to build a supermarket on the Greenwich Peninsula was won amid "fierce competition" from other supermarket chains. The site, a former sports ground, was a prestigious one at the time, since it was close to the Greenwich Millennium Village and the Millennium Dome. The brief stipulated that the design should "reflect the environmental aspirations of the adjacent Millennium Village".

Tesco had commissioned a design from Aukett Architects and Asda had commissioned a design from Grimshaw Architects; Morrisons had also submitted a design. The original Sainsbury's design, by Chetwoods Architects, was circular and designed so that it could be built anywhere on a north–south axis; it was initially thought by the firm to be too eccentric but was presented to the Sainsbury's board who unanimously chose it, believing it to be the most likely to succeed in competition with other supermarkets' designs.

Sunday Business reported in May 1998 that Asda had initially been chosen, but that the deal had "foundered" and Sainsbury's was then selected. Sainsbury's bought the site for more than £30 million.

Sainsbury's winning bid led to scrutiny from the Conservative Party in the House of Commons, led by Tim Yeo, the shadow minister responsible for planning. The scrutiny was due to Lord Sainsbury being a Labour Party donor and having a close relationship with Deputy Prime Minister John Prescott.

== Design ==
The Greenwich store was designed to minimise its environmental impact and give a more pleasant shopping experience. Dino Adriano, Sainsbury's CEO, said the building marked "a watershed in supermarket architecture". The store was designed by Paul Hinkin of Chetwood Associates, and helped the architecture practice "[become] noticeable on the architectural horizon". Other companies involved in the project include Max Fordham & Partners as concept engineers, Oscar Faber Partnership as services engineers, WSP as structural engineers, and RGCM as construction managers.

The supermarket covered 55,000 sq ft (5,100 m^{2}), including 33,000 sq ft (3,100 m^{2}) of trading space. Hinkin described the building as "a simple rectangular plan" with six internal columns. The store was designed to be "a naturally lit and ventilated food hall surrounded and protected by earth banks". This was done with a saw-tooth roof section which let daylight in, as well as allowing people inside to see the sky. The building had a steel frame and concrete walls, covered by banks of earth; the entrance was glass-fronted with timber walls to each side and the service areas at the back of the building were faced with grey bricks. The store included bakery, meat, fish and delicatessen counters, a customer café, warehouse space, offices, and a staff canteen.

=== Sustainable features ===
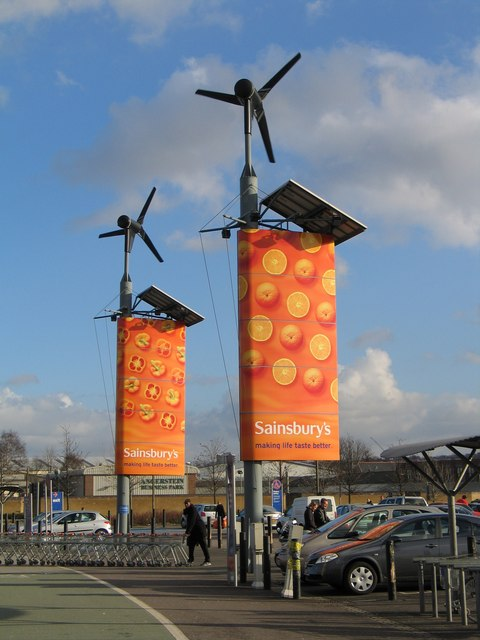
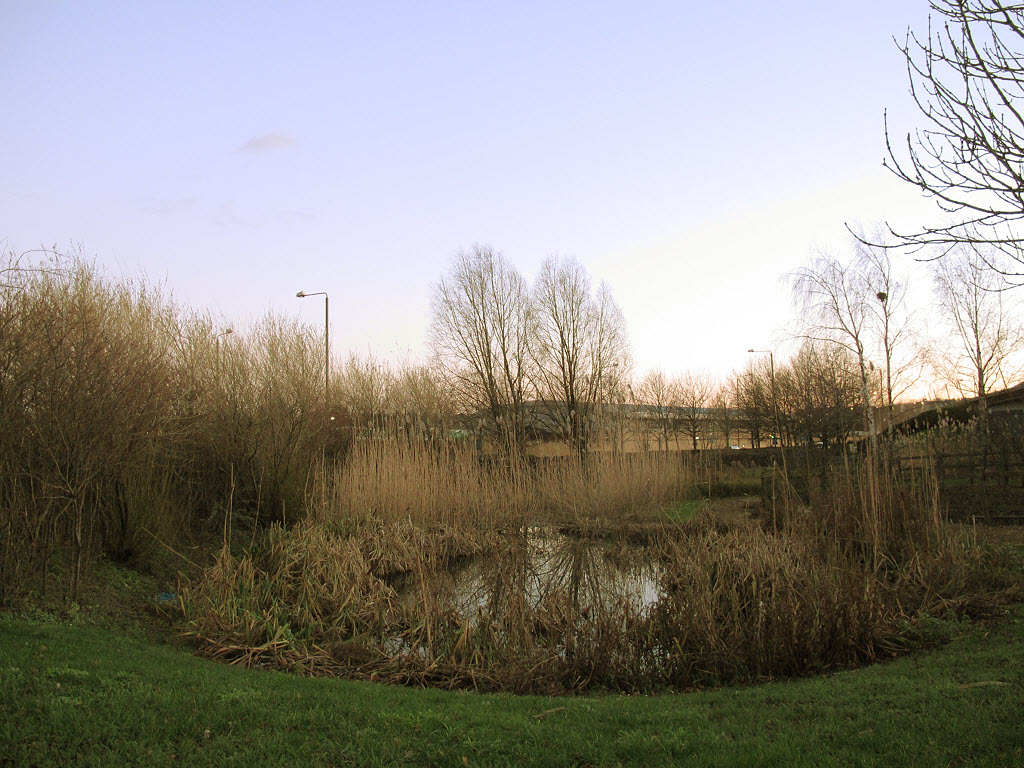
Wind turbines and pond habitat at Sainsbury's Greenwich

By utilising daylight instead of artificial lighting and having combined heat and power (CHP), Sainsbury's Greenwich consumed 50% less energy than a conventionally-designed supermarket. Wind turbines and solar panels were installed to provide renewable energy, intending to generate enough to power the store's signs overnight. In reality, there was often not enough sunlight or wind power to have the signs permanently illuminated and they were later connected to the National Grid. The store's petrol station was the first Sainsbury's building to be built with solar panels; since panels were expensive at the time, none of the company's other buildings had solar panels installed until 2011. Energy-saving measures were predicted to save £60,000 per year; it was intended that, by 2001, energy-saving and sustainable features could be evaluated and replicated in other stores.

The building's sides were covered with earth to increase insulation, although this had to be altered in the final designs to allow for emergency exits. The landscaping around the store was done by the Woodland Trust. It included various habitat types including woodland and meadow areas and a wetland pond and reed bed which used recycled water from the building's roof. The entrance lobby was created from recycled aircraft parts and car tyres and wall panels in the toilets were made from recycled plastic bottles.

==== Criticism ====
The building's environmental credentials did not go unchallenged, especially due to the design's perceived car-centricity. A report by the Institute for Transportation and Development Policy said that the supermarket "cater[ed] to the car" and highlighted its location next to a 300-space free car park. An article in The Evening Standard noted that "for all the oil by-products saved by the panels in the nappy-changing rooms, rather more will come out of the thousands of exhaust pipes that will come and go everyday", and Friends of the Earth said the building was "repeating one of the worst mistakes of the 20th century in producing a car-generating high street-destroying superstore". Sainsbury's responded that people using cars to go shopping was the current reality, and that using other forms of transport was something that would have to be introduced gradually.

Despite Hinkin's argument that the building was "ideally suited for a wide range of uses", a principal criticism of the store's design was that it was seen as inflexible, which impacted upon its sustainability. The listing report by English Heritage noted that the heating and cooling systems limited the way the shop floor could be used, and the building's architecture meant that extension or alteration was less feasible.

=== Recognition and press coverage ===
The building scored a perfect 31 out of 31 environmental rating, the highest score ever for a retail building, and was the first supermarket and first British building to receive an 'excellent' BREEAM rating. It was recognised as "the greenest supermarket building in the world" at the time, and described by architecture critic Robert Park as "the most energy-efficient supermarket building we have ever seen".

The store's environmentally friendly features were often covered by the press, sometimes heavily relying on Sainsbury's own promotional materials. The reception from the architectural and national press was generally positive.

==== Awards ====
Sainsbury's Greenwich received a number of awards for its architecture and sustainable design. It was awarded 'millennium product' status by the Design Council on 14 December 1999. In 2000, it was shortlisted for the RIBA Stirling Prize and won a RIBA Regional Award and the RIBA Journal Sustainability Award. The store also won the Design Museum's Design Sense Award, the Retail Week Store Design of the Year 2000, and Channel 4's Building of the Year: People's Choice 2000.

== Opening and history ==
Sainsbury's Greenwich was opened on 14 September 1999 by Jamie Oliver. The store became one of 20 Sainsbury's shops in South East London to take part in what the company described as "the UK's first urban composting trial" to dispose of food waste that could not be donated. Sainsbury's reported that the Greenwich store reduced its refuse collection from weekly to up to every three weeks. The building was refitted in 2007 to resolve servicing issues and improve energy efficiency by another 20%. The store's exterior timber walls, originally untreated white oak, were replaced with new varnished wood.

In her 2008 thesis on supermarket architecture, Audrey Kirby suggested that the Greenwich store had "not fulfilled its much publicised potential" as a benchmark for supermarket design since conventional supermarkets continued to be built in the years afterwards, leaving it "a one-off" venture. The following year, Sainsbury's Greenwich was one of the company's nine initial stores to install electric vehicle charging points; The Evening Standard said that this was "a boost" to Mayor of London Boris Johnson's push to promote electric vehicle use in London. In 2010, Jacob Zuma visited the store during his state visit to the UK. Zuma had requested a tour, and was accompanied by Justin King (Sainsbury's CEO) and Hilary Benn (the Environment Secretary).

== Closure and demolition ==
=== Plans for closure ===
In February 2012, Sainsbury's announced its plans to leave its Greenwich store, move to a larger site nearby, and lease the vacant building to a different, non-supermarket retailer. The company said it was "looking to build a new flagship environmental store" and that new environmental technologies could be used if it built a new store. Hinkin, the store's architect, said that the building should be used, as intended, for food retailing, and disagreed with Sainsbury's that the store's environmental features had been surpassed. Some architects and designers suggested that the building's sustainability was compromised by its specific design as a food retailer, and that it should have been designed with reuse in mind.

In November 2013, Hinkin started a petition against the building's demolition, claiming that it represented "an act of vandalism". Hinkin asked for help from the Royal Institute of British Architects (RIBA), but said they had "sat on their hands"; RIBA president Stephen Hodder called the supermarket "a landmark of its time" and said he would be sad to see it demolished, but concluded that it was a decision for the local council to make. The petition gained support from over 1000 people, including architects George Ferguson and Angela Brady, and Green Party leader Natalie Bennett.

=== Listing application and planning permission ===
In February 2014, after IKEA had applied for permission to demolish the store and build a larger one in its place, The Twentieth Century Society (C20) submitted an application to English Heritage for Sainsbury's Greenwich to be grade II* listed. (Note: Buildings less than 30 years old are not generally considered for listing and have to demonstrate "outstanding quality", equivalent to grade I or II*.) This would have made it both the first listed supermarket in the UK and the youngest building to ever be listed. Catherine Croft, the C20's director, said that demolition would be "a tragic waste of energy and resources" and result in the loss of "the most innovative retail store to have been built in the UK in the last 50 years".

According to Building Design, IKEA's application for demolition was "expected to be recommended for approval" by Greenwich London Borough Council. The council received objections from Baroness Jenny Jones (then a member of the London Assembly), the Greenwich Conservation Group, the Westcombe Society, the Charlton Society as well as from the general public; 36 supporting letters were also received. In March 2014, Greenwich Council's planning board approved IKEA's proposal by five votes to two, while saying that the store's demolition was "unfortunate". Croft said the decision was disappointing, but said that it would not alter the ongoing listing application.

Hinkin died on 16 August 2014, aged 49. On 18 August, English Heritage advised against listing the supermarket. Although it described the building's architecture as "graceful and humanised", its architectural interest was seen as limited due to the design's simple interior plan and lack of flexibility. The building's historic interest was also not deemed sufficient for listing, because the store "has not proven to be influential but rather a one-off." Sajid Javid, the Secretary of State for Culture, accepted the recommendation and issued a Certificate of Immunity from Listing, meaning that another listing application could not be made for five years. The refusal of the listing application allowed plans for demolition to go ahead. Sainsbury's Greenwich was included on C20's Risk List for 2015, which also included Hyde Park Barracks, Robin Hood Gardens, Hove Town Hall, and St Peter's Seminary.

=== Demolition ===
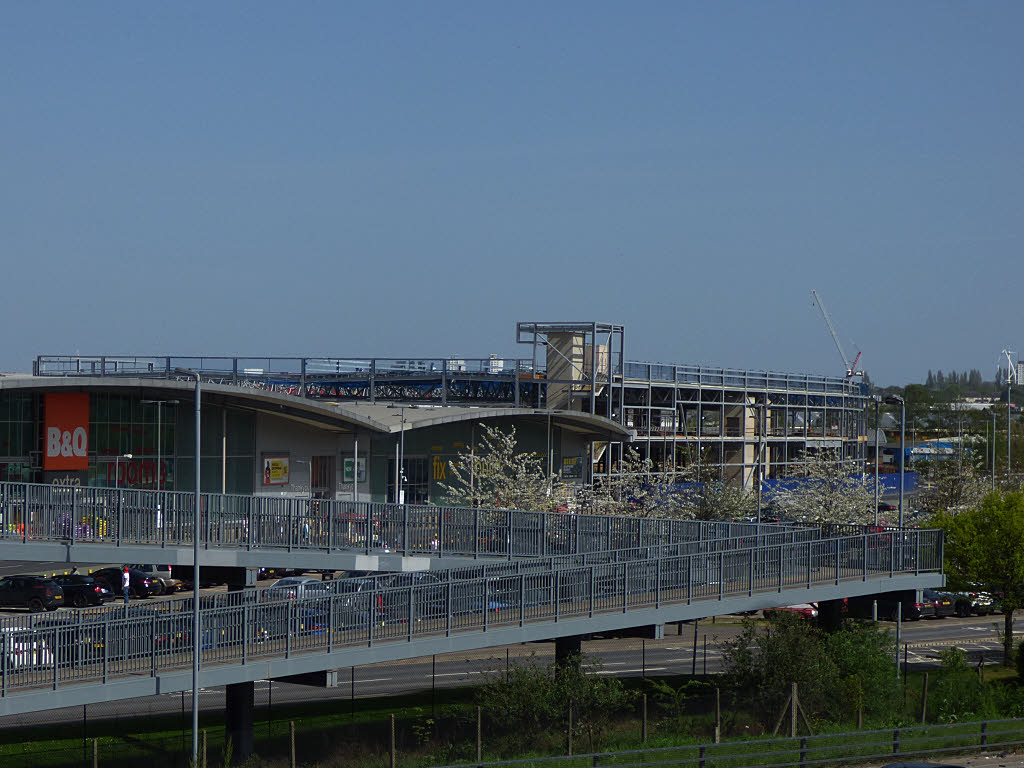
The IKEA store being built on the site in 2018

The store's last day open was on 24 June 2015, closing for the final time at 6pm. It was demolished in early 2016. The IKEA store built on the site opened in 2019 and was described by the company as "our most sustainable store".

== See also ==
- Sainsbury's, Camden—Another Sainsbury's supermarket which was grade II listed in 2019
