= North light =

North light or North Light can refer to:

- North Light - a racehorse
- North light (architecture) - light entering a building from the north
  - the windows provided in a Saw-tooth roof to let light in from north
- a film scanner produced by the FilmLight company
- North Light Books United States art publisher
- Block Island North Light lighthouse on Block Island, Rhode Island
- Grand Island North Light lighthouse on the north end of Grand Island
