= DJV =

DJV may refer to

- Don't Just Vote, Get Active
- Deutsches Jungvolk
- Deshapremi Janatha Viyaparaya, Sri Lanka
- Deutscher Journalisten-Verband (DJV) or German Journalists Association
