= NCOR (disambiguation) =

NCOR is the National Conference on Organized Resistance.

NCOR may also refer to:

- Nuclear receptor co-repressor 1 (NCOR1), a protein
- Nuclear receptor co-repressor 2 (NCOR2), a protein
