= G20 2009 =

G20 2009 may refer to:

- 2009 G20 London summit, the G20 summit on 2 April 2009 in London, UK
- 2009 G20 Pittsburgh summit, the G20 summit on 24–25 September 2009 in Pittsburgh, USA
