= Don't Just Vote, Get Active =

Political catchphrase

"Don't Just Vote" logo from CrimethInc. promotional campaign leaflet

Don't Just Vote, Get Active, also known as Don't Just (Not) Vote (DJV) was an open, decentralized national campaign in the United States of America initiated by the CrimethInc. Ex-Workers Collective and its allies. DJV was publicly announced at the National Conference on Organized Resistance (NCOR) in 2004 and was an activist-orientated propaganda initiative focused on demonstrating the effectiveness of direct democracy and direct action over political representation. The campaign was interpreted by some as a counterpoint to Punkvoter and other anti-Bush voter participation efforts. However, organizers initially conceived of the campaign without knowledge of the Punkvoter campaign.

== Overview ==
According to one of the 20,000 voter's guides distributed by those involved with the campaign before the 2004 presidential election, "Voting for people to represent your interests is the least efficient and effective means of applying political power. The alternative, broadly speaking, is acting directly to represent your interests yourself." Unlike previous projects critical of electoral politics, DJV deliberately avoided the voting vs. abstention argument that is common in the anarchist milieu.

The campaign was characterised by The American Prospect as "a clear inheritor of the spirit of 1968", citing its willingness to celebrate in the street, regardless of the outcome. In the election's aftermath, Don't Just Vote, Get Active endorsed the Anarchist Resistance "call to action" against the 2005 presidential inauguration.

== Criticism ==
The campaign was criticised in Green Anarchy for its credulous if qualified endorsement of voting, accusing CrimethInc. of offering "a soothing middle ground" instead of outright rejecting statist mechanisms of control. In a reworking of the campaign's slogan, the magazine exhorted readers "don't JUST be active, WAKE THE FUCK UP!" Mark Andersen, in All the Power: Revolution without Illusion praised the initially empowering message of the campaign but criticised it for "a slide toward insular subcultural politics", drawing note to the recurrent phrases "tyranny of the majority", "living without permission" and "autonomy" which he claimed evinced an "esoteric, self-referential approach" which would turn acolytes into "radical navel-gazers".

== See also ==
- Anarchism in the United States
- Bl(A)ck Tea Society, an organization created for the purpose of protesting the 2004 Democratic National Convention
- Criticisms of electoralism
