= Central Telephone Exchange =

Historic building in Melbourne, Australia

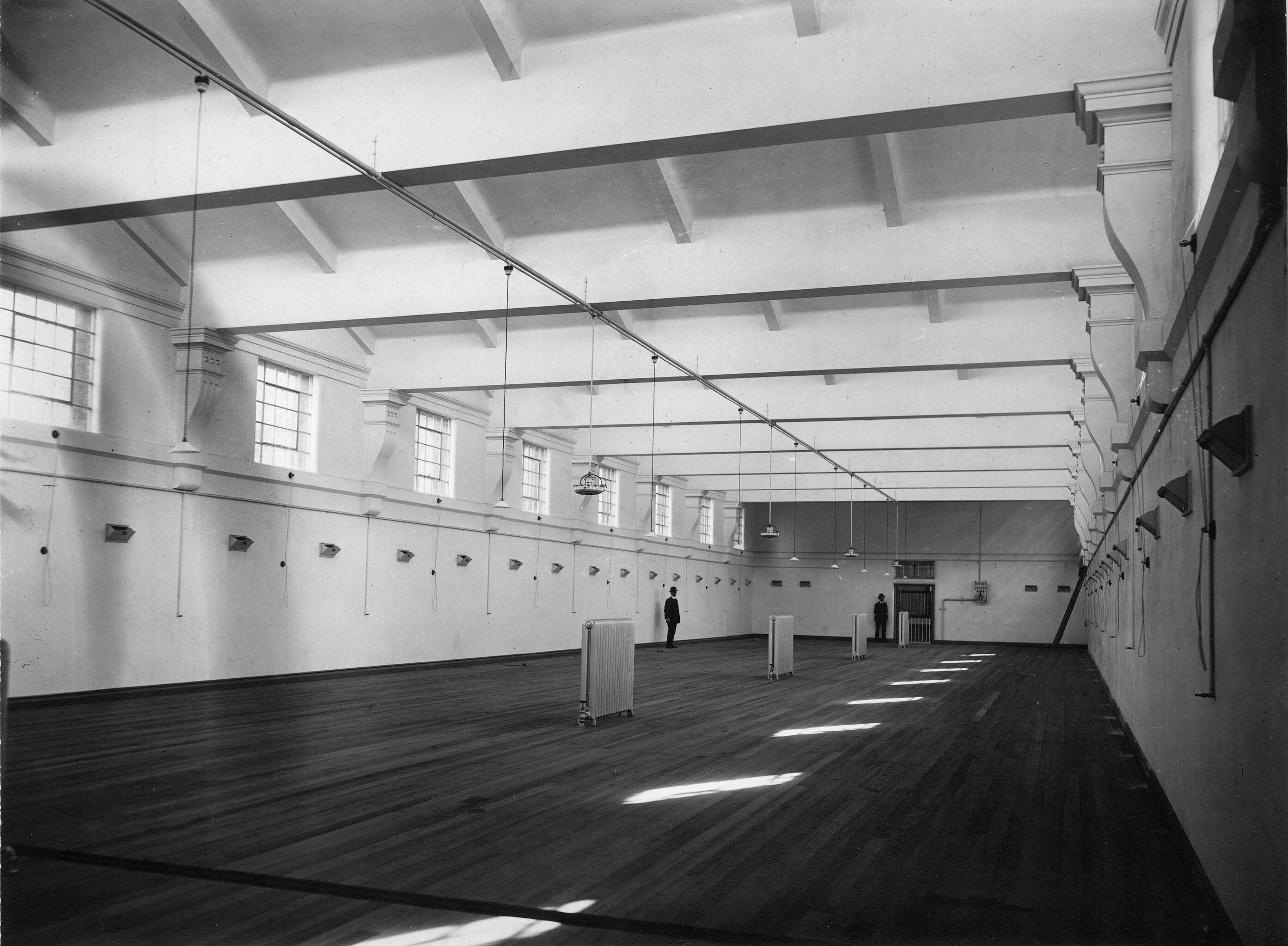
Switch board room, top floor of the Central Telephone Exchange

The Central Telephone Exchange, Melbourne is a building in Central Melbourne, Australia, constructed between May 1907 and early 1909 by the Reinforced Concrete & Monier Pipe Construction Co. headed by engineer Sir John Monash, and designed by architect Samuel Charles Brittingham. The building includes an early example of a reinforced-concrete saw-tooth roof.

The building was commissioned by the Public Works Department of the Commonwealth of Australia to house the new telephone service, which came under the recently formed Post Master General's Department following Federation of the Australian Colonies in 1901. the contract for construction was let in February 1908.

The Lonsdale Street facade of the exchange was a two-storey Italianate style office block with stone facing with a long, narrow, three-storey building behind. This housed the exchange plant. The design employed reinforced concrete suspended floors supported on the load-bearing brick masonry walls and a centre row of reinforced concrete columns.

The building was the scene of the Australian novel Murder In The Telephone Exchange by June Wright (1919-2012).

== External Sources ==
- Melbourne Central Telephone Exchange (Visit) : Proceedings of the Victoria Institute of Engineers (vol. XIII, 1912)
