= CrimethInc. =

Anarchist collective

CrimethInc. Ex-Workers Collective
- CrimethInc. wordmark
- Type: Decentralized collective
- Purpose: The "pursuit of a freer and more joyous world"
- Members: Voluntary association
- Website: crimethinc.com

CrimethInc., also known as CWC, which stands for either "CrimethInc. Ex-Workers Collective" or "CrimethInc Ex-Workers Ex-Collective", is a decentralized anarchist collective of autonomous cells. CrimethInc. emerged in the mid-1990s in the United States, initially as the hardcore zine Inside Front, and began operating as a collective in 1996. It has since published articles and zines for the anarchist movement and distributed posters and books of its own publication. Due to the nature of the organization it is difficult to estimate the number of people who are regularly involved in CrimethInc activities.

CrimethInc cells have published books, released records, and organized national campaigns against globalization and representative democracy, and in favor of radical community organizing. Less-public splinter groups have carried out direct action (including arson and hacktivism), hosted international conventions and other events, maintained local chapters, sparked riots, and toured with multimedia performance art or anarcho-punk musical ensembles. The collective has received national media and academic attention, as well as criticism and praise from other anarchists for its activities and philosophy. Several sympathizers or associates have been convicted of crimes related to CrimethInc.

CrimethInc has an association with the North American anarcho-punk scene due to its relationship with artists in the genre and its publishing of Inside Front as well as more recently the contemporary anti-capitalist movement.

== Activities ==
Cells have toured with hardcore anarcho-punk musical ensembles. In 2002, a cell in Olympia, Washington, staged a five-day film festival. Cells have also supported various large-scale campaigns with publicity work, including "Unabomber for President" and the "Don't Just (Not) Vote" election campaigns as well as the protests against the Free Trade Area of the Americas of 2003 in Miami, Florida.

Individuals adopting the CrimethInc. nom de guerre have included convicted Earth Liberation Front arsonists, as well as hacktivists who successfully attacked the websites of Drug Abuse Resistance Education, the Republican National Committee, and sites related to U.S. President George W. Bush's 2004 re-election campaign. These activities have earned the collective occasional attention from the mainstream news media. Several CrimethInc. cells have worked in collaboration with other anti-capitalists and anarchists to promote Steal Something From Work Day every April 15, which coincides with the United States Tax Day, to protest perceived exploitation in the workplace.

=== Publications and media ===
The creation of propaganda has been described as the collective's core function. Among their best-known publications are the books Days of War, Nights of Love, Expect Resistance, Evasion, Recipes for Disaster: An Anarchist Cookbook, the pamphlets To Change Everything: an Anarchist Appeal (available in paper, PDF and video form), and Fighting For Our Lives (with 650,000 copies printed by 2010), the hardcore punk/political zine Inside Front, and the music of hardcore punk bands.

CrimethInc. is connected to publishing collectives/organizations with similar ideas, notably the Curious George Brigade, which has written a number of publications including Anarchy in the Age of Dinosaurs. CrimethInc texts have received coverage at least six times in anarchist media or academic publications, and have been used as reading materials for university courses on anarchism.

CrimethInc distributes documentaries such as Breaking the Spell (anti-free-trade) and PickAxe (anti-logging). In 2021, the collective's downtown Olympia publishing location burned in a fire.

In 2022, Elon Musk suspended a CrimethInc Twitter account seemingly at the behest of Andy Ngo, who characterized the collective as "making propaganda & training material to radicalize militants toward violence". CrimethInc accused Musk of purchasing Twitter "to silence opposition".

=== Convergences ===
Convergence locations

- Des Moines, Iowa (2002)
- Louisville, Kentucky (2003)
- Des Moines, Iowa (2004)
- Bloomington, Indiana (2005)
- Winona, Minnesota (2006)
- Athens, Ohio (2007)
- Milwaukee, Wisconsin (2008)
- Pittsburgh, Pennsylvania (2009)

Since the summer of 2002, CrimethInc has hosted annual conventions, termed "convergences", open to anyone. Estimates of attendance range in the low hundreds. These events typically featuring the performances of traveling theatrical troupes, musicians, direct-action and mutual-aid workshops, camping trips, Reclaim the Streets actions, and organized large Critical Mass events.

The 2007 convergence in Athens, Ohio, saw an impromptu street party which resulted in one arrest on riot charges. The Athens News characterized the convergence as "a sort of networking, resume-swapping opportunity for would-be radicals, free-thinkers, Levellers, Diggers, Neo-Luddites, and other assorted malcontents." It is typical of these gatherings to require that all attendees have something to contribute to the event.

Harper's journalist Matthew Power described the 2006 convergence in Winona, Minnesota, as "Several hundred young anarchists from around the country" who organized discussions "ranging from the mutualist banking [and] theories of the nineteenth-century anarchist philosopher Pierre-Joseph Proudhon" Power also said: "They saw 'the revolution' not as a final product but as an ongoing process; they wanted not just to destroy the capitalist system but to create something livable in its place.

One firm rule at these CrimethInc events has been to prohibit police informants. Nonetheless, information gathered by FBI informants at CrimethInc convergences (in 2004, 2005, and 2008) contributed to the convictions of Eric McDavid and his associates, as well as 2008 Republican National Convention protester Matthew DePalma.

In 2010, CrimethInc. announced the We Are Everywhere campaign of national tours and events in lieu of the traditional convergence. In 2015, CrimethInc. embarked on the similar To Change Everything two-month tour of the United States.

=== Music ===
CrimethInc. is associated with the North American anarcho-punk scene because of its long relationship with notable musicians in the genre and its publishing of Inside Front, a "journal of hardcore punk and anarchist action". CrimethInc. releases include LPs, CDs, and 7-inch vinyl records from North American and European anarcho-punk, hardcore, and anti-folk bands, including Catharsis, Zegota, Requiem, and From the Depths. Academic Stacy Thompson has described CrimethInc. as "exemplary of a more contemporary and nuanced approach" to the possible forms anarcho-punk could take to resist commodification through aesthetic expression. However, Thompson does not consider the aesthetic choices of the collective to be substantially different from the anarcho- and crust punk bands released by fellow anarcho-punk collective Profane Existence in the mid-to-late 90s.

== Philosophy ==
Crimethought is not any ideology or value system or lifestyle, but rather a way of challenging all ideologies and value systems and lifestyles—and, for the advanced agent, a way of making all ideologies, value systems, and lifestyles challenging.

— Crimethinc.com

CrimethInc as a loose association represents a variety of political views. Their frequently-asked questions page asserts it has "no platform or ideology except that which could be generalized from the similarities between the beliefs and goals of the individuals who choose to be involved—and that is constantly in flux." "CrimethInc." is an anonymous tag, and as such anyone can publish under the name or create a poster using the logo. Each person or group operates autonomously. As well as the traditional anarchist opposition to the state and capitalism, CrimethInc. participants have at times advocated a straight edge lifestyle, the total displacement of gender roles, violent insurrection against the state, and the refusal of work.

CrimethInc. is influenced by the Situationist International, and has been described by scholar Martin Puchner as "inheritors of the political avant-garde". For their part, the authors of the book criticized the "exclusive, anti-subjective" nature of history as "paralyzing", advocating in its place a non-superstitious myth. The collective has often expressed a strident anti-copyright stance and also advocates of the appropriation of texts and ideas, which has attracted criticism from academic philosopher George MacDonald Ross as an endorsement of plagiarism. CrimethInc.'s N©! free license is known as an example of copyleft. The license grants rights to individuals but not to corporations.

The active participants of CrimethInc. characterize it as a mindset and a way of life first and foremost, rather than as an organization per se. Its main goal is to inspire people to take more active control of their own lives, becoming producers of culture and history instead of passive consumers. Those who subscribe to the CrimethInc. philosophy advocate radical ways of living one's life to the end of eliminating the perceived inequities and tyrannies within society. Contributors to publications are generally not credited by name, believing anonymity is a core principle. The name "CrimethInc." itself is a satirical self-criticism about the hypocrisy of revolutionary propaganda and other "margin-walking between contradictions", and a direct reference to the concept of "thoughtcrime" developed in George Orwell's Nineteen Eighty-Four.
