= Deep plan =

Type of building design

A deep plan building is a building in which the horizontal distance between exterior walls is many times greater than the floor to floor height. Deep plan buildings make more efficient use of site area. They also cost less to build per unit floor area because of their smaller wall to floor area ratio.

Deep plan buildings introduce complications for light and ventilation penetration. These are relatively easily solved for single story buildings (for example using sawtooth roofs) but usually necessitate artificial lighting and air conditioning or ventilation if over one story.
