= Sawtooth Building =

Historic building in Berkeley, California

Coordinates: 37.859346°N 122.292411°W

The Sawtooth Building is a historic 1913 brick and steel industrial structure in Berkeley, California which was built to serve as the West Coast manufacturing headquarters of the Kawneer Manufacturing Co. It gets its name from the saw-tooth roof form of its design.

The Sawtooth Building is located at 2547 Eighth Street, between Dwight Way and Parker Street. The building was constructed for the Kawneer Manufacturing Company founder, Swedish born cabinet-maker, architect, inventor, machinist, and businessman Francis John Plym (1869–1940). The aluminum storefront products of the Kawneer Manufacturing Company are considered to have revolutionized storefront design and influenced the appearance of retail and commercial building design around the world.

The structure's primary distinguishing features are large clerestory windows built into twenty saw-tooth-shaped roof bays; these stretch the entire width of the building. These are considered early precursors to the glass-curtain designs that dominated later twentieth century office buildings.

Additions were made between 1947 and 1950, including an office structure on Dwight Way employing the company's own products from the middle of the twentieth century. It was described as ...one of Berkeley’s most artistic manufacturing plants, which is used as a model for industry in many places.

The building was eventually purchased by the Sealy Mattress Co. in 1959; the firm continued operations there up to 1972. The site was then purchased by A.J. Bernard, and divided into 35 smaller spaces for sublease to small industries, craftspeople, artisans, artists, performance spaces and a school.
