= Millennium product =

Millennium Product
- Design Council logo given to products awarded Millennium Product status
- Description: Recognition for British products demonstrating innovation and creativity
- Country: United Kingdom
- Presented by: Design Council

The Millennium Product status was awarded by the Design Council to British products and companies which show "imagination, ingenuity and inspiration" as well as "innovation, creativity and design".

Over 4,000 products were submitted, and 1,012 were selected for the award. The products were exhibited adjacent to the Millennium Dome during 2000.

Sainsbury's Greenwich, the supermarket chain's flagship store, was awarded Millennium Product status on 14 December 1999.
