= Samuel Charles Brittingham =

- Born: 1 January 1860
- Died: 12 November 1944 (aged 84); Abbotsford, Victoria, Australia
- Occupation: Architect
- Buildings: Burke St West Police Station, Parkville Post Office, Maryborough State High School, Box Hill Primary School, Old Arts Building, Horsham Base Hospital
- Projects: Morwell Planning Scheme

Samuel Charles Brittingham (1860 - 12 November 1944) was a British-born architect who worked extensively in Australia in the early twentieth century.

== Early life and career ==
Brittingham was a pupil in the Victorian Education Department from 1875 to 1879 and then remained as assistant 1879–85, before taking up a position with the Victorian Public Works Department in 1886.

He passed the examination of the Royal Institute of British Architects in London on 9 November 1906, although he appears to have sat it in Melbourne at the time.

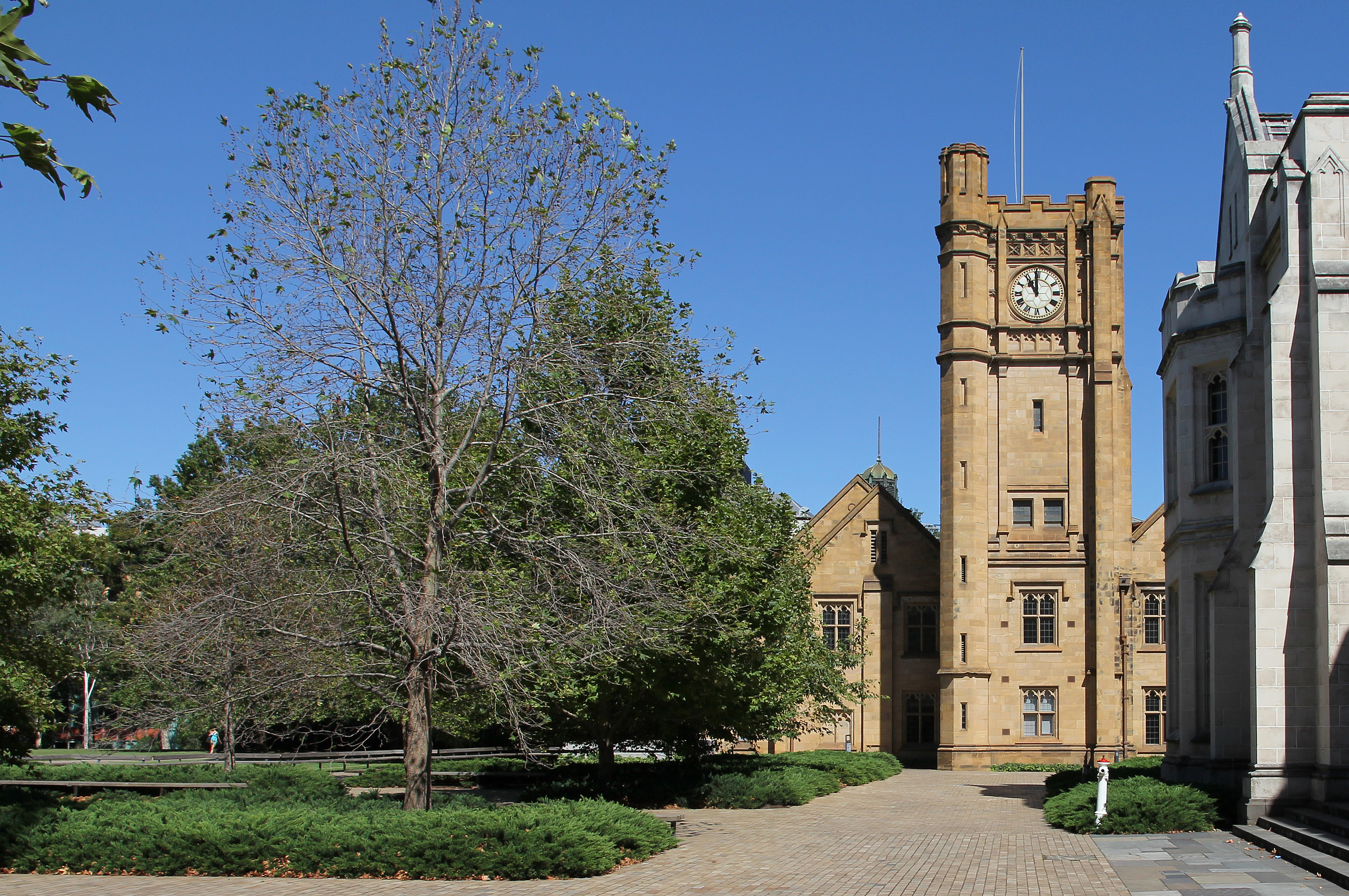
Old Arts Building at Melbourne University

He became Victorian Government Architect and was responsible for a number of prominent public buildings in Victoria including the Old Arts Building at Melbourne University, 1919–24, Parkville Post Office, and Bourke St West Police Station as well as a number of other public buildings.

As government architect he was responsible for the first buildings in national parks, including the rangers house (1909) and visors' Chalet (1923) at Wilsons Promontory National Park. It is likely he also designed the Mount Buffalo Chalet.

In 1918 Brittingham proposed a scheme to alleviate Melbourne's traffic congestion by constructing a bridge to extend Exhibition Street across the Jolimont railway yards anticipating the present Exhibitions Street extension by 80 years. He later attended own planning conferences and was instrumental in the new planning scheme devised for the Morwell coal fields.

== Family ==
His parents were William and Ann Amelia Brittingham

siblings – Walter Edgar Brittingham. died 14 Feb 1945 (6th son) Elizabeth, Rachel, May, and Alfred Furkess.

wife – Mrs. Lily Edith Brittlngham, died at home in Chrystobel crescent Hawthorn around 2 June 1937

two sons – Dr. L. C. Brittingham, of East St. Kilda, and Mr. G. J. Brittingham, of Port Kembla.

Brittingham died on 12 November 1944 at his home in Chrystobel crescent Hawthorn, aged 84. For 47 years he was associated with the public service and was a trustee of the Methodist Church, Oxley Road, Auburn. He was buried at Kew Cemetery.

== Awards and membership ==
Associate of the Royal Institute of British Architects 10 June 1907 proposed by G C Inskip, W A Pite, E A Gruning.

RIBA nomination papers A v17 p102

== Works ==
- Morwell Town Planning Scheme.
- Old Burke St West Police Station (with S.E. Bindley) 1887-9
- Parkville Post Office and Quarters (with S.E. Brindley) 1889
- Central Telephone Exchange, Melbourne 1907-9
- Mount Buffalo Chalet, 1910 – probably designed by Brittingham – he inspected the site in 1924 in regards extensions.
- Fairfield Primary School 1910
- Maryborough High School 1912
- The Box Hill Primary School 1919
- Women's VD Clinic 'Septic Clinic for Women' 372- 378 Little Lonsdale Street 1919
- Old Arts Building (Melbourne University) 1921
- Horsham Base Hospital in 1926.
