= List of international presidential trips made by Jacob Zuma =

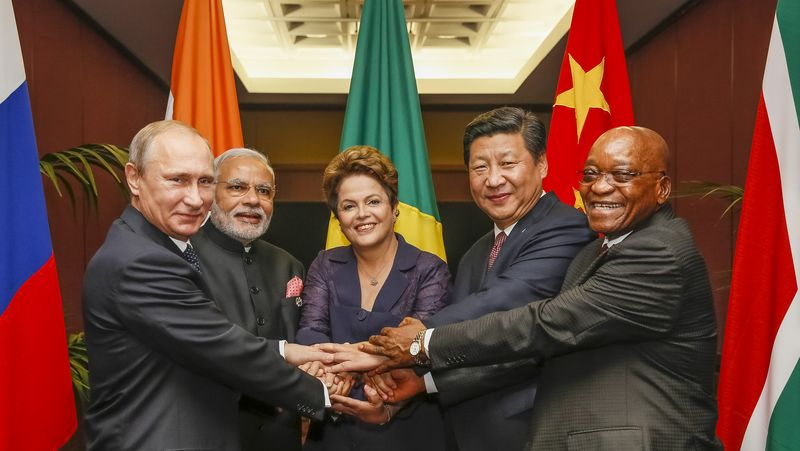
BRICS Heads of State at 2014 G-20 Summit in Brisbane

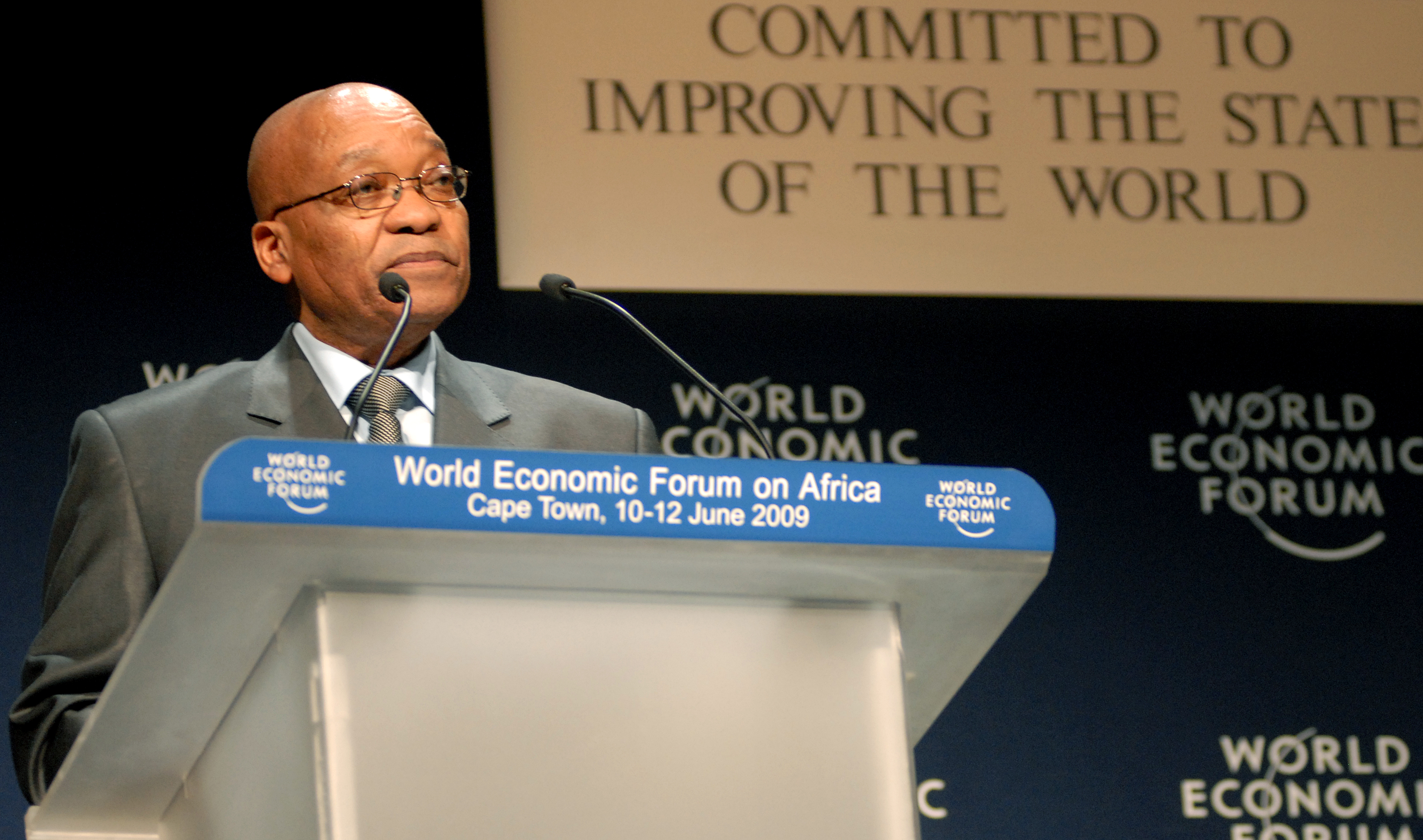
Zuma speaking at the 2009 WEF in Davos

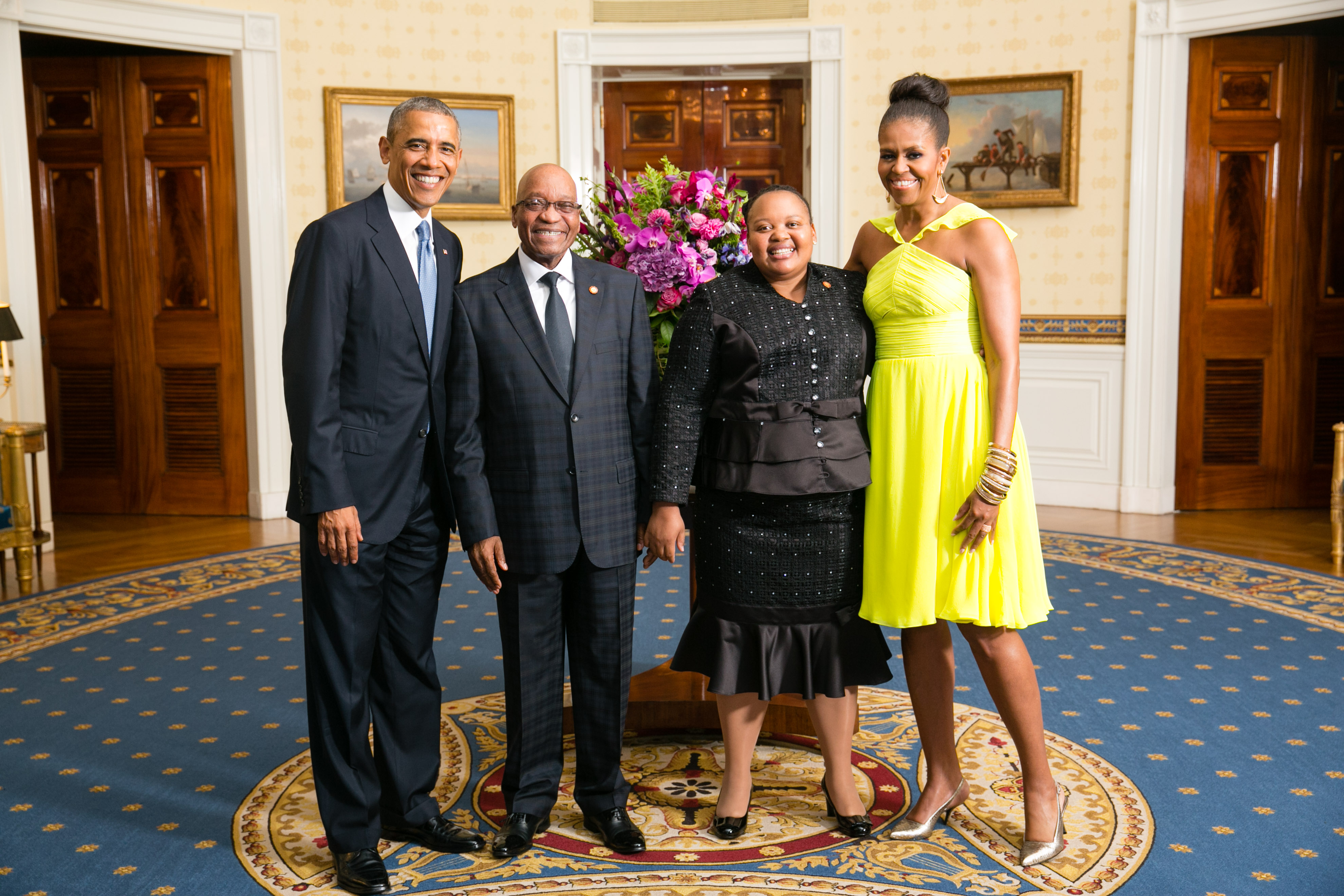
Zuma attended the US-Africa Summit Dinner with US President Obama

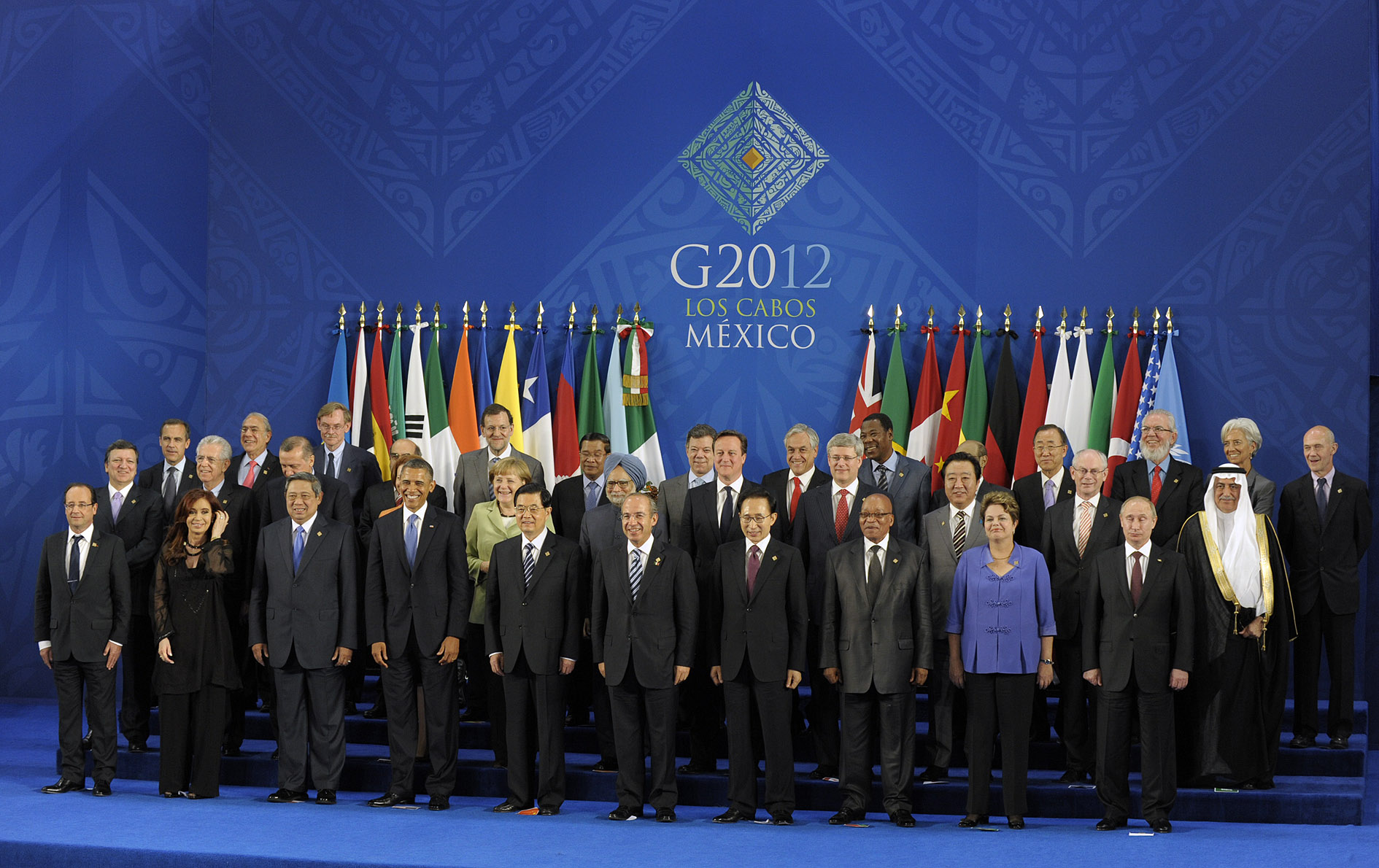
Zuma along with other G-20 Leaders in Los Cabos Mexico, 2012

This is a list of international presidential trips made by Jacob Zuma while president of South Africa. Jacob Zuma began his presidency on 9 May 2009 following the African National Congress win in the 2009 South African general election and ended his tenure on 14 February 2018.

== Summary of international trips ==
Jacob Zuma has made several foreign trips on all six continents, with several visits around Southern Africa and various multi-lateral visits around the world.

Map showing International trips made by Zuma as President 1 Visit 2 Visits 3 Visits 4 Visits 5+ Visits South Africa

Number of visits	Country
1 visit	Burundi, Canada, Chad, Denmark, Ghana, Guinea, Indonesia, Iran, Italy, Japan, Malawi, Malaysia, Norway, Oman, Rwanda, Senegal, Seychelles, South Sudan, Sri Lanka, Trinidad & Tobago, Turkey, United Arab Emirates, United Kingdom
2 visits	Australia, Cuba, Germany, Ivory Coast, Mexico, Qatar, South Korea, Sudan
3 visits	Algeria, Benin, Brazil, Egypt, Kenya, Mauritania
4 visits	India, Libya, Republic of Congo, Swaziland, Uganda, Zambia
5+ visits	Angola (18), Botswana (9), China (7), DR Congo (6), Equatorial Guinea (5), Ethiopia (18), France (6), Lesotho (6), Mozambique (8), Namibia (6), Nigeria (5), Russia (7), Switzerland (6), Tanzania (8), United States (10), Zimbabwe (6),

== 2009 ==
Country	Location(s)	Date(s)	Notes
Libya	Sirte	29 June – 3 July	21st Summit of New Partnership for Africa's Development (NEPAD) Heads of State.
Italy	L'Aquila	8–10 July	35th G8 summit.
Egypt	Sharm El Sheikh	14–16 July	XV Non-Aligned Movement (NAM) Summit.
Angola	Luanda	19–21 August	Inaugural State Visit.
DR Congo	Kinshasa	7–8 September	6th Ordinary SADC Heads of State Summit.
United States	New York City, Pittsburgh	23–25 September	Sixty-fourth session of the United Nations General Assembly and 2009 G20 Pittsburgh summit.
Brazil	São Paulo	8–10 October	State visit.
Equatorial Guinea	Malabo	3–4 November	State visit with Teodoro Obiang Nguema Mbasogo.
Trinidad & Tobago	Port of Spain	26–29 November	2009 Commonwealth Heads of Government Meeting.
Zambia	Lusaka	7–9 December	State visit with Rupiah Banda.
Denmark	Copenhagen	17–18 December	2009 United Nations Climate Change Conference.

== 2010 ==
Country	Location(s)	Date(s)	Notes
Angola	Luanda	10 January	2010 Africa Cup of Nations opening ceremony.
Switzerland	Davos	25–29 January	World Economic Forum.
Ethiopia	Addis Ababa	2 February	14th Ordinary Session of the Heads of State and Government Assembly of the African Union.
United Kingdom	London	2–3 March	State visit.
Namibia	Windhoek	20–21 March	Inauguration of Hifikepunye Pohamba.
Zimbabwe	Harare	17–18 March	State visit with Robert Mugabe.
Uganda	Kampala	25–26 March	State visit with Yoweri Museveni.
United States	Washington, D.C.	12–14 April	2nd Nuclear Security Summit.
Brazil	Brasília	16 April	2nd BRIC summit
Namibia	Windhoek	22 April	Southern African Customs Union (SACU) conference.
Tanzania	Dar es Salaam	5–7 May	World Economic Forum.
Algeria	Algiers	25–26 May	State visit with Abdelaziz Bouteflika.
France	Nice	27 May – 1 June	25th Africa France Summit and 37th G8 summit.
India	Mumbai	2–4 June	State visit.
Canada	Toronto	25–27 June	2010 G20 Toronto summit.
Uganda	Kampala	24–27 July	15th Ordinary session of the assembly of Heads of State and government of the African Union.
Russia	Moscow	5–6 August	State visit with Dmitry Medvedev.
Lesotho	Maseru	12–13 August	State visit.
China	Beijing	24–26 August	State visit.
Egypt	Cairo	19–20 October	State visit with Hosni Mubarak.
Namibia	Windhoek	4 November	State visit with Hifikepunye Pohamba.
Tanzania	Dar es Salaam	6 November	Inauguration of Jakaya Kikwete.
South Korea	Seoul	11–12 November	2010 G20 Seoul summit.
Botswana	Gaborone	19–20 November	Southern African Development Community (SADC) Heads of State and Government Summit.
Libya	Tripoli	29–30 November	3rd European Union - African Union Summit.
Cuba	Havana	6–7 December	State visit.
Mexico	Cancún	8–9 December	2010 United Nations Climate Change Conference.

== 2011 ==
Country	Location(s)	Date(s)	Notes
Switzerland	Davos	25–27 January	World Economic Forum.
Ethiopia	Addis Ababa	28–31 January	16th Ordinary Session of the African Union (AU) Assembly.
Mauritania	Nouakchott	10 February	Côte d'Ivoire peace talks.
Ivory Coast	Abidjan	21 February	African Union (AU) High-Level Panel on the Resolution of the Crisis in Côte d'Ivoire.
France	Paris	2–3 March	State visit with Nicolas Sarkozy.
Mauritania	Nouakchott	4 March	Côte d'Ivoire peace talks.
Ethiopia	Addis Ababa	11 March	African Union (AU) High-Level Panel on the Resolution of the Crisis in Côte d'Ivoire.
Zambia	Livingstone	31 March	SADC Troika Summit.
Mauritania	Nouakchott	10 April	Libya peace talks.
Libya	Tripoli, Benghazi	11 April	Libya peace talks.
China	Sanya	14 April	3rd BRICS summit.
Libya	Tripoli	30 May	Peace talks with Muammar Gaddafi.
DR Congo	Kinshasa	21 June	State visit with Joseph Kabila.
Russia	Sochi	3–4 July	Talks on Libya with Dmitry Medvedev.
Equatorial Guinea	Malabo	5 July	17th Ordinary Session of the African Union (AU) Assembly.
Sudan	Khartoum	8–9 July	State visit with Omar al-Bashir.
South Sudan	Juba	9 July	Inauguration of the new State of South Sudan.
Angola	Luanda	17 August	31st Ordinary Summit of SADC Heads of State and Government.
Ethiopia	Addis Ababa	27 August	291st Peace and Security Council meeting of the African Union (AU).
Norway	Oslo	1 September	State visit.
United States	New York City	18–25 September	Sixty-sixth session of the United Nations General Assembly.
Australia	Perth	27–30 October	2011 Commonwealth Heads of Government Meeting.
France	Cannes	2–5 November	2011 G20 Cannes summit.
DR Congo	Lubumbashi	12 November	Grand Inga Hydro-Electric Power Project MoU signing.
United Arab Emirates	Abu Dhabi	13–14 November	State visit.
Oman	Muscat	15–16 November	State visit with Qaboos bin Said.
Nigeria	Abuja	10 December	State visit with Goodluck Jonathan.
Benin	Cotonou	11 December	State visit with Thomas Boni Yayi.
Mozambique	Maputo	13 December	State visit with Armando Guebuza.

== 2012 ==
Country	Location(s)	Date(s)	Notes
United States	New York City	10–11 January	UN High-Level Panel on Global Sustainability.
Qatar	Doha	23 January	State visit with Hamad bin Khalifa Al Thani.
Switzerland	Davos	25–26 January	World Economic Forum.
Ethiopia	Addis Ababa	27–29 January	18th Ordinary Session of the African Union (AU) Assembly.
Benin	Cotonou	19 February	State visit with Thomas Boni Yayi.
Angola	Luanda	19 February	Talks with José Eduardo dos Santos.
Benin	Cotonou	18 March	African Union Heads of State and Government Ad-Hoc Committee.
South Korea	Seoul	26–27 March	Nuclear Security Summit.
India	New Delhi	29 March	4th BRICS summit.
Angola	Luanda	1 June	Southern African Development Community (SADC) Extraordinary Summit.
Mexico	Cabo San Lucas	17–19 June	2012 G20 Los Cabos summit.
Ethiopia	Addis Ababa	16–17 July	19th Ordinary Session of the African Union (AU) Assembly of Heads of State and Government.
China	Beijing	19–20 July	State visit with President Hu Jintao.
Seychelles	Victoria	25 July	SADC Troika summit on Madagascar mediation talks.
Zimbabwe	Harare	15 August	SADC Mediation of Zimbabwe.
Mozambique	Maputo	17–18 August	SADC Summit.
Botswana	Gaborone	29–30 August	State visit with Ian Khama.
Ethiopia	Addis Ababa	1 September	Funeral of Prime Minister Meles Zenawi.
United States	New York City	23–27 September	Sixty-seventh session of the United Nations General Assembly.
Tanzania	Dar es Salaam	7–8 December	Southern African Development Community (SADC) Extra-Ordinary Summit. Summit to discuss the security situation in Madagascar and Zimbabwe.

== 2013 ==
Country	Location(s)	Date(s)	Notes
Tanzania	Dar es Salaam	10 January	Southern African Development Community (SADC) Extra-Ordinary Summit. Summit to discuss the progress on the directives after the previous summit.
Angola	Luanda	16 January	State Visit. Bilateral consultations with José Eduardo dos Santos.
Switzerland	Davos	21–25 January	World Economic Forum.
Ethiopia	Addis Ababa	26–27 January	20th Ordinary Session of the African Union Assembly of Heads of State.
Equatorial Guinea	Malabo	22–23 February	Third Africa-South America (ASA) Summit.
Ethiopia	Addis Ababa	24 February	Signing ceremony of the Peace, Security and Cooperation Framework for the Democratic Republic of the Congo.
Angola	Luanda	12 March	Trilateral meeting with José Eduardo dos Santos and Joseph Kabila.
Chad	N'Djamena	3 April	Extraordinary Summit of the Economic Community of Central African States (ECCAS) to discuss Developments in the Central African Republic.
Kenya	Nairobi	9 April	Inauguration of Uhuru Kenyatta.
Botswana	Gaborone	12 April	Southern African Customs Union (SACU) Summit.
Algeria	Algiers	14–15 April	State visit with Abdelaziz Bouteflika.
Nigeria	Abuja	16 April	State visit with Goodluck Jonathan.
Republic of Congo	Brazzaville	3 May	Contact Group Meeting on the Central African Republic.
Russia	Moscow	15–16 May	State visit.
Ethiopia	Addis Ababa	24–27 May	21st Ordinary Session of the African Union Assembly of Heads of State.
Japan	Yokohama	1–4 June	Tokyo International Conference on African Development and working visit.
Mozambique	Maputo	27 June	SADC Infrastructure Investment Summit.
Republic of Congo	Brazzaville	23 July	Forbes Africa Forum.
Malawi	Lilongwe	17–18 August	33rd Ordinary Southern African Development Community (SADC) Summit of Heads of State and Government.
Angola	Luanda	23 August	Followup, trilateral meeting with José Eduardo dos Santos and Joseph Kabila after March 2013 meeting.
Malaysia	Kuala Lumpur	26–27 August	
Russia	Saint Petersburg	5–8 September	2013 G20 Saint Petersburg summit.
United States	New York City	23–26 September	Sixty-eighth session of the United Nations General Assembly.
Senegal	Dakar	1–2 October	State visit with Macky Sall.
Ethiopia	Addis Ababa	12 October	Extraordinary Summit of the African Union.
DR Congo	Kinshasa	29–30 October	State visit with Joseph Kabila.
Namibia	Windhoek	6–7 November	State visit with Hifikepunye Pohamba.
Sri Lanka	Colombo	15–17 November	2013 Commonwealth Heads of Government Meeting.
Ghana	Accra	26–27 November	State visit.

== 2014 ==
Country	Location(s)	Date(s)	Notes
Angola	Luanda	15 January	Fifth Ordinary Summit of International Conference of Great Lakes Region.
Ethiopia	Addis Ababa	30–31 January	22nd Ordinary Session of the African Union Assembly.
Republic of Congo	Brazzaville	11 February	State visit, 25th Anniversary of the Signature of the Brazzaville Accord on Peace in Southern Africa.
Zimbabwe	Harare	1 March	State visit with Robert Mugabe and wedding of President Mugabe's daughter.
Angola	Luanda	24 March	Mini Summit of International Conference of Great Lakes Region.
Lesotho	Maseru	27 March	State visit with Tom Thabane.
Equatorial Guinea	Malabo	25–27 June	23th Ordinary Session of the African Union Assembly (AU Summit)
Brazil	Brasília, Fortaleza, Rio de Janeiro	13–16 July	6th BRICS summit, 2014 FIFA World Cup Final game.
Lesotho	Maseru	29 July	State visit.
Zimbabwe	Victoria Falls	17–18 August	34th Ordinary SADC Summit of Heads of State and Government.
Russia	Sochi	24–29 August	State visit with Vladimir Putin.
Lesotho	Maseru	9 September	State visit.
United States	New York City	24–30 September	Sixty-ninth session of the United Nations General Assembly.
Australia	Brisbane	13–16 November	2014 G20 Brisbane summit.
Botswana	Gaborone	20 November	State visit.
China	Beijing	4–5 December	State visit with President Xi Jinping.
Equatorial Guinea	Malabo	13–14 December	State visit with Teodoro Obiang Nguema Mbasogo.
Tanzania	Dar es Salaam	21 December	State visit with Jakaya Kikwete.
Uganda	Kampala	22 December	State visit with Yoweri Museveni.

== 2015 ==
Country	Location(s)	Date(s)	Notes
Guinea	Conakry	13 January	State visit with Alpha Condé.
Angola	Luanda	14 January	Talks with José Eduardo dos Santos.
Mozambique	Maputo	15 January	Inauguration of Filipe Nyusi.
Switzerland	Davos	20–24 January	World Economic Forum.
Ethiopia	Addis Ababa	30–31 January	24th Ordinary Session of the African Union Assembly of Heads of State.
Sudan	Khartoum	1 February	State visit with Omar al-Bashir.
Lesotho	Maseru	17 March	Inauguration of Prime Minister Pakalitha Mosisili.
Algeria	Algiers	30 March – 1 April	State visit with Abdelaziz Bouteflika.
Egypt	Cairo	1–2 April	State visit with Abdel Fattah el-Sisi.
Zimbabwe	Harare	29 April	Southern African Development Community (SADC) Extraordinary Summit of Heads of State and Government.
Russia	Moscow	9 May	70th Anniversary of Victory in the Great Patriotic War.
Angola	Luanda	18 May	Extraordinary Summit of the International Conference on the Great Lakes Region.
Mozambique	Maputo	20–21 May	State visit with Filipe Nyusi.
Nigeria	Abuja	29 May	Inauguration of Muhammadu Buhari.
Tanzania	Dar es Salaam	1 June	Emergency East African Community (EAC) Heads of State and Government Summit on Burundi.
Russia	Ufa	7–9 July	7th BRICS summit.
Botswana	Gaborone	17–18 August	35th Ordinary Southern African Development Community (SADC) Summit of Heads of State and Government.
China	Beijing	3 September	70th Anniversary of the End of the Occupation of China.
Mozambique	Maputo	11 September	Matola Monument and Interpretative Centre in commemoration.
United States	New York City	28 September – 3 October	Seventieth session of the United Nations General Assembly.
DR Congo	Kinshasa	16 October	Ninth Session of the Bi-National Commission (BNC)
India	New Delhi	29–30 October	Third India-Africa Forum Summit.
Tanzania	Dar es Salaam	5 November	Inauguration of John Magufuli.
Germany	Berlin	10 November	State visit with Angela Merkel.
Angola	Luanda	11 November	40th Angolan Independence Anniversary.
Namibia	Windhoek	12 November	SACU Headquarters Opening.
Turkey	Antalya	14–16 November	2015 G20 Antalya summit.
Angola	Luanda	24 November	State Visit. Bilateral consultations with José Eduardo dos Santos.
France	Paris	30 November	Twenty First Conference of the Parties of the United Nations Framework for Climate Change Convention.

== 2016 ==
Country	Location(s)	Date(s)	Notes
Botswana	Gaborone	18 January	Extra-Ordinary Summit of the SADC Double Troika.
Switzerland	Davos	20–21 January	World Economic Forum.
Ethiopia	Addis Ababa	30–31 January	26th Ordinary Session of the African Union Assembly (AU Summit).
Burundi	Bujumbura	25–26 February	African Union High-Level Delegation of Heads of State visit.
Nigeria	Abuja	8–9 March	State visit with Muhammadu Buhari.
France	Lyon	22–23 March	United Nations High Level Commission on Health Employment and Economic Growth.
Botswana	Gaborone	18 April	SACU consultations
Namibia	Windhoek	19 April	SACU consultations
Swaziland	Mbabane	21–22 April	SACU consultations
Iran	Tehran	24–25 April	State visit.
Uganda	Kampala	12 May	Inauguration of Yoweri Museveni.
Qatar	Doha	19 May	State visit with Hamad bin Khalifa Al Thani.
Lesotho	Maseru	9 June	Southern African Customs Union consultations.
Angola	Luanda	14 June	6th Ordinary Summit of International Conference of the Great Lakes Region.
Botswana	Gaborone	28 June	Extra-Ordinary Summit of the Southern African Development Community (SADC) Double Troika.
France	Paris	13–14 July	State visit with François Hollande.
Rwanda	Kigali	15–18 July	27th Ordinary Session of the Assembly of the African Union (AU) Summit.
Kenya	Nairobi	25 August	Tokyo International Conference on African Development VI Summit.
Swaziland	Mbabane	30–31 August.	36th Ordinary Southern African Development Community (SADC) Summit of Heads of State.
China	Hangzhou, Guangdong	3–8 September	2016 G20 Hangzhou summit and 2nd Investing in Africa Forum in Guangdong.
United States	New York City	17–23 September	Seventy-first session of the United Nations General Assembly.
Kenya	Nairobi	10–12 October	State visit with Uhuru Kenyatta.
India	Benaulim	15–16 October	8th BRICS summit.
Mozambique	Maputo	20 October	State visit with Filipe Nyusi.
Angola	Luanda	24 October	State Visit. Bilateral consultations with José Eduardo dos Santos.
Zimbabwe	Harare	3 November	SA-Zimbabwe Bi-National Commission.
Ethiopia	Addis Ababa	8 November	African Union High Level Committee on Libya.
Cuba	Havana	29 November	State funeral of Fidel Castro.

== 2017 ==
Country	Location(s)	Date(s)	Notes
Ethiopia	Addis Ababa	28–31 January	28th Assembly of Heads of State and Government of the African Union.
Indonesia	Jakarta	5–8 March	Indian Ocean Rim Association Leaders' and Business summit.
Swaziland	Manzini	17–18 March	SADC Extraordinary Summit of Heads of State and Government.
Tanzania	Dar es Salaam	11–12 May	State visit with John Magufuli.
Swaziland	Manzini	23 June	5th Southern Africa Customs Union Summit.
Ethiopia	Addis Ababa	3–4 July	29th Session of the Assembly of Heads of State and Government of the African Union.
Germany	Hamburg	7–8 July	2017 G20 Hamburg summit.
Zambia	Lusaka	5 August	91st Agricultural and Commercial Show as a Guest of Honour.
Mozambique	Maputo	24–25 August	SA -Mozambique Bi-National Commission.
China	Xiamen	3–5 September	9th BRICS summit.
Republic of Congo	Brazzaville	9 September	African Union (AU) High Level Committee Meeting on Libya.
United States	New York City	19–25 September	Seventy-second session of the United Nations General Assembly.
Angola	Luanda	26 September	Inauguration of João Lourenço.
Zambia	Lusaka	12–13 October	State visit with Edgar Lungu.
Nigeria	Owerri	14 October	Imo Merit Award.
DR Congo	Kinshasa	15 October	State visit with Joseph Kabila.
Botswana	Gaborone	17 November	4th Session of South Africa-Botswana Bi-National Commission.
Angola	Luanda	21 November	Summit of the SADC Organ Troika.
Ivory Coast	Abidjan	28–30 November	5th European Union - African Union Summit.

== 2018 ==
Country	Location(s)	Date(s)	Notes
Ethiopia	Addis Ababa	28–29 January	30th Ordinary Session of the Assembly of Heads of State and Government of the African Union.
