= 2009 G20 Pittsburgh summit =

3rd meeting of the G20, held in US

G20 Summit on Financial Markets and the World Economy 3rd G20 summit
- 24–25 September 2009
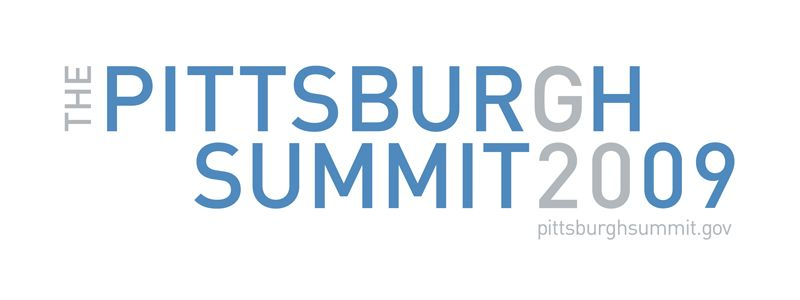
- Host country: United States
- Cities: Pittsburgh
- Venues: David L. Lawrence Convention Center
- Participants: G20 + the Netherlands, Spain, NEPAD, ASEAN, the UN, the World Bank, the IMF, the WTO, APEC, and the FSF.
- Chair: Barack Obama

The 2009 G20 Pittsburgh Summit was the third meeting of the G20 heads of state and heads of government, held in Pittsburgh, Pennsylvania, United States, to discuss financial markets and the world economy.

== History ==
The G20 is the premier forum for discussing, planning and monitoring international economic cooperation.

The fall 2009 G20 summit was held at the David L. Lawrence Convention Center in Pittsburgh, Pennsylvania, United States, on September 24–25, 2009. Announced shortly after the April 2009 G20 London summit, U.S. President Barack Obama volunteered to host this summit, initially planning to hold it in New York City and coordinating it with the opening of the United Nations General Assembly. Due to coordination issues, however, the Obama Administration announced a change of venue on May 28, 2009 to Pittsburgh in order to highlight the city's economic recovery following the collapse of the city's manufacturing sector during the latter half of the 20th century. In response to the Global credit crisis, a G20 summit in one year was proposed shortly after the London summit in April 2009.

Among the issues discussed was a proposal to radically reform the International Monetary Fund (IMF). French President Nicolas Sarkozy also suggested that there would be an evaluation of measures already taken.

== Summit facilities ==
The primary venue of the summit was the David L. Lawrence Convention Center, which was at one point the largest Leadership in Energy and Environmental Design-certified building in the world. A working dinner for world leaders was held at the Phipps Conservatory & Botanical Gardens, chosen to highlight its environmentally friendly features including an earth-sheltered welcome center and a Tropical Forest Conservatory described as the world's most energy efficient. Other venues used around the city include The Andy Warhol Museum, the Pittsburgh High School for the Creative and Performing Arts and Rosemont, the working farm of Teresa Heinz Kerry.

== Preparations ==
In the weeks leading up to the conference, many measures were taken to prepare Pittsburgh for the conference. Many streets in Downtown Pittsburgh were re-paved and a pre-season National Hockey League hockey game for the Pittsburgh Penguins at nearby Mellon Arena was rescheduled. During the week of the G20, many streets were closed, and traffic patterns were adjusted. Many public schools, universities and nearby businesses were closed, canceling classes or working remotely for the duration of the conference. Pittsburgh Mayor Luke Ravenstahl also attempted to alleviate problems by meeting beforehand with some of the groups expected to protest during the event.

=== Security ===
Thousands of protesters were expected during the week of the Summit, which was classified as a National Special Security Event. Security was coordinated by the United States Secret Service, working in conjunction with the Pittsburgh Police. It is estimated that 4,000 police officers were requested, and the city only had 900 police officers at the time of the event. The Pennsylvania State Police committed more than 1,000 officers for the downtown event, including SWAT, helicopter, mounted, undercover, bicycle and motorcycle officers. Allegheny County had 75 officers specifically trained by and embedded into the Pittsburgh Police Bureau for the event since June. New York City and Baltimore also committed some officers, as well as Pittsburgh suburbs. Some officers from Chicago traveled to assist, taking vacation days from their department. All officers, regardless of department, were under the command of the Secret Service for the event days.

Chinook and Black Hawk helicopters, armored Humvees and crews of U.S. Army soldiers, as well as 10 25-foot boats with M240 machine guns from the Coast Guard, were on hand in the event of large-scale violent protests or a terrorist attack.

== Attendance ==
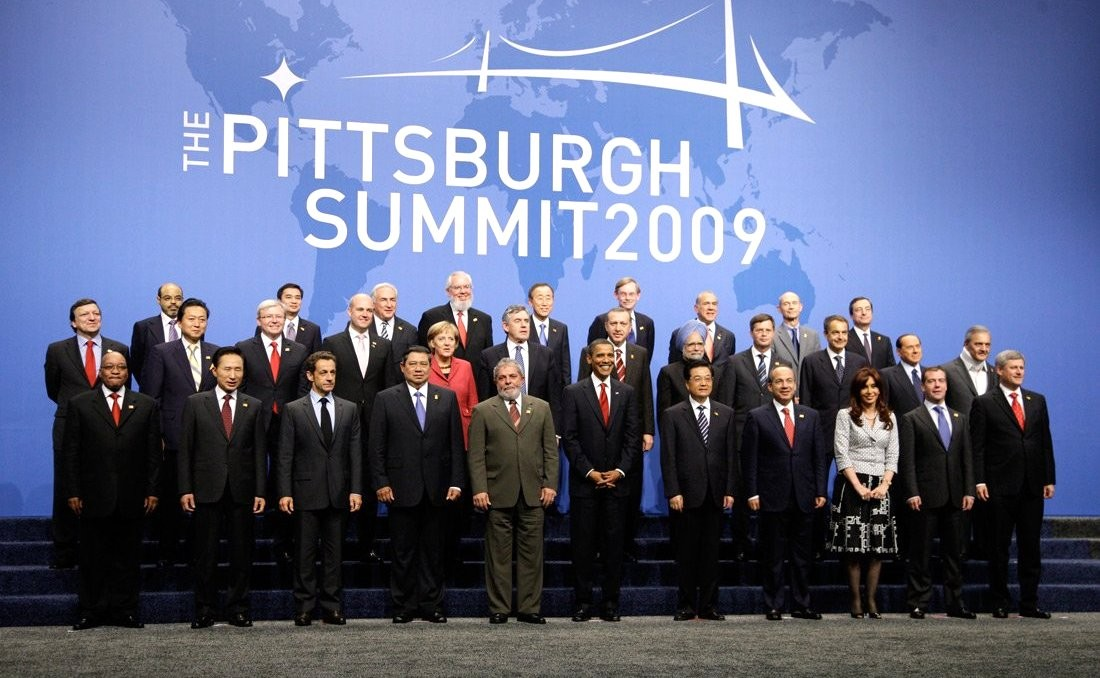
Leaders of the G20 countries present at the Pittsburgh Summit.

G20 leaders began gathering in Pittsburgh on September 24, 2009. On the evening of September 24, the leaders attended a reception at Phipps Conservatory in the Oakland neighborhood of Pittsburgh.

The Summit proper began on the morning of September 25 at the David L. Lawrence Convention Center, downtown.

=== Core participants ===
The following participants of the Pittsburgh summit represented the core members of the G20, which includes 19 countries and the European Union which is represented by its two governing bodies, the European Council and the European Commission.

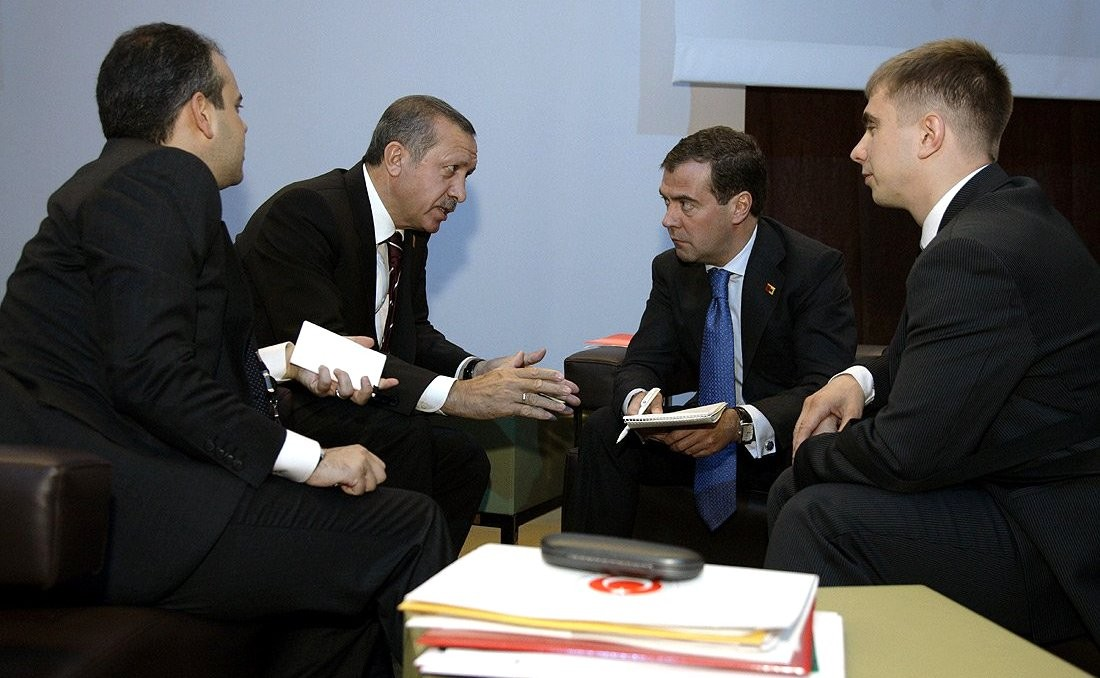
Dmitry Medvedev and Recep Tayyip Erdogan with interpreters in the foreground.

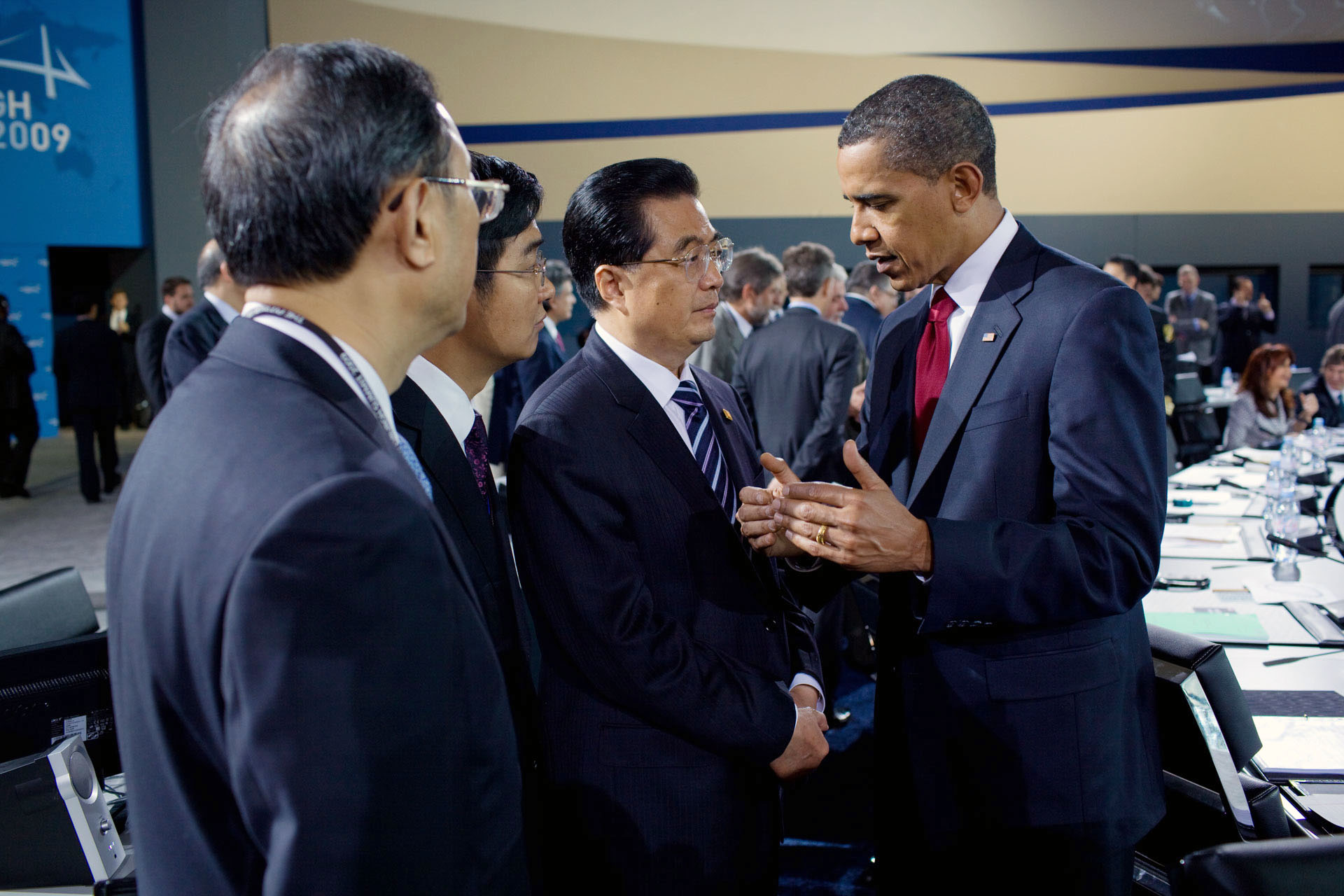
Hu Jintao and Barack Obama at the plenary session of the summit

G20 members Host nation and leader are indicated in bold text.
Member		Represented by	Title
(Argentina)	Argentina	Cristina Fernández de Kirchner	President
(Australia)	Australia	Kevin Rudd	Prime Minister
(Brazil)	Brazil	Luiz Inácio Lula da Silva	President
(Canada)	Canada	Stephen Harper	Prime Minister
(China)	China	Hu Jintao	President
(France)	France	Nicolas Sarkozy	President
(Germany)	Germany	Angela Merkel	Chancellor
(India)	India	Manmohan Singh	Prime Minister
(Indonesia)	Indonesia	Susilo Bambang Yudhoyono	President
(Italy)	Italy	Silvio Berlusconi	Prime Minister
(Japan)	Japan	Yukio Hatoyama	Prime Minister
(Mexico)	Mexico	Felipe Calderón	President
(Russia)	Russia	Dmitry Medvedev	President
(Saudi Arabia)	Saudi Arabia	Abdullah bin Abdul Aziz	King
(South Africa)	South Africa	Jacob Zuma	President
(South Korea)	South Korea	Lee Myung-bak	President
(Turkey)	Turkey	Recep Tayyip Erdoğan	Prime Minister
(United Kingdom)	United Kingdom	Gordon Brown	Prime Minister
(United States)	**United States**	**Barack Obama**	**President**
(European Union)	European Commission	José Manuel Barroso	President
(European Union)	European Council	Fredrik Reinfeldt	President
**Invited states**
State		Represented by	Title
(Ethiopia)	Ethiopia	Meles Zenawi	Prime Minister
(Netherlands)	Netherlands	Jan Peter Balkenende	Prime Minister
(Spain)	Spain	José Luis Rodríguez Zapatero	Prime Minister
(Thailand)	Thailand	Abhisit Vejjajiva	Prime Minister
**International organisations**
Organisation		Represented by	Title
	ASEAN	Surin Pitsuwan	Secretary General
	ASEAN	Abhisit Vejjajiva	Chairman
	Financial Stability Forum	Mario Draghi	Chairman
	International Monetary Fund	Dominique Strauss-Kahn	Managing Director
	New Partnership for Africa's Development (NEPAD)	Meles Zenawi	Chairman
	Organisation for Economic Co-operation and Development	José Ángel Gurría	Secretary General
(United Nations)	United Nations	Ban Ki-moon	Secretary General
	World Bank Group	Robert Zoellick	President
	World Trade Organization	Pascal Lamy	Director-General

== Protests ==
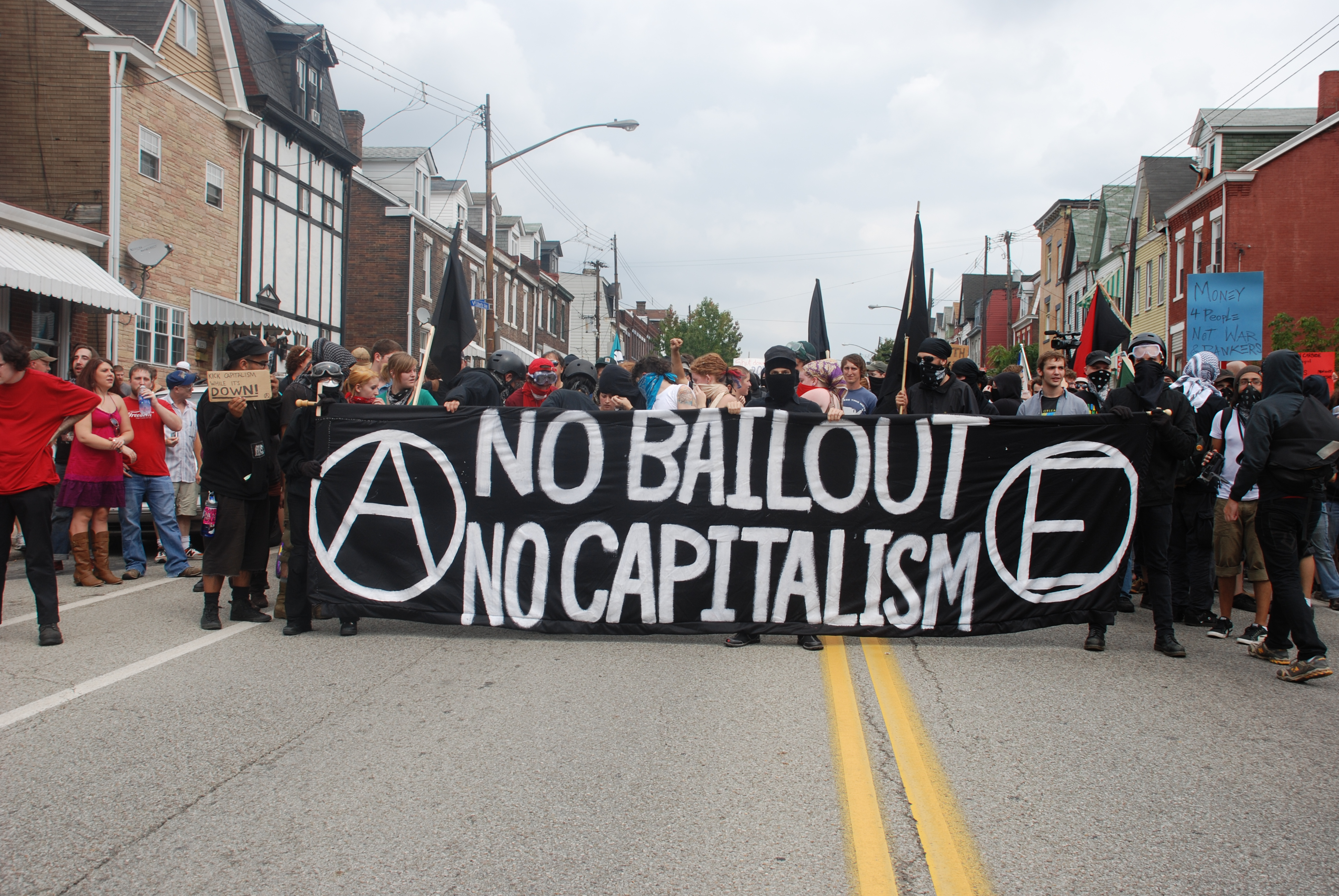
Protesters in the Lawrenceville neighborhood of Pittsburgh on September 24.

After numerous denials of permits for groups such as Code Pink and Three Rivers Climate Convergence to assemble peaceful demonstrations, the ACLU of Pennsylvania successfully sued to force the city of Pittsburgh to allow demonstrations around the G20 Summit.

Participants in the protests surrounding the summit included peace, environmental, labor and social justice organizations.

The first of the alternate events was a Peoples' Summit, involving an all-day session of speakers, panels and workshops on September 19, the Saturday before the G20 Summit, drawing about 500 participants, and continuing on Monday and Tuesday evenings, each drawing between 100 and 200. The Peoples' Summit included outright opponents of the G20 (such as radical historian Howard Zinn, who addressed the gathering via special video) as well as some who hoped to influence it in what they considered to be "progressive" directions. The Pittsburgh City Council proclaimed "that the Council of the City of Pittsburgh does hereby commend the Peoples' Summit, all associated institutions and organizations, and the citizen volunteers who worked tirelessly to make it a success. Their outstanding efforts are certain to create a greater understanding about the challenges we face, the solutions we should explore and the social dialogue that is necessary for the realization of a better world. Furthermore, the citizens of our region are encouraged to seize the opportunity to participate in this significant and historic event." The Peoples' Summit itself advanced some of the themes that surfaced in protests when the G20 Summit actually met: "We envision a world in which basic rights—freedom of expression, freedom of thought and religion, freedom from fear, and freedom from want—are enjoyed by all people. This is not the reality of our world today. Yet, in our diversity and plurality of orientations, inspired by mutual respect and the spirit of solidarity, we share the conviction that another world is possible."

This was followed by a number of tent cities, demonstrations and other summits. There was also an alternative conference on Tuesday called the Freedom Conference 2009, stressing conservative grassroots solutions and free-market approaches.

At around 10:15 a.m. on Wednesday, September 23, Greenpeace activists hung a banner, warning of the dangers of increased CO_{2} emissions, from the deck of the West End Bridge facing downtown Pittsburgh over the Ohio River. While traffic was held up for a period, all eight activists were placed under arrest after surrendering peacefully.

On Thursday, September 24, the Pittsburgh G20 Resistance Project held a march and a day of direct action at Arsenal Park in the city's Lawrenceville neighborhood. Police fired pepper spray at a crowd of an estimated 500 demonstrators to disperse a protest march a few hours before the start of the Summit.

Police also used a Long Range Acoustic Device (LRAD) to remove protesters from an area after warning them several times to disperse. This was believed by city officials to be the first time that an LRAD had been used to disperse protesters within the United States. Since then, LRADs have been used to disperse crowds on several occasions.

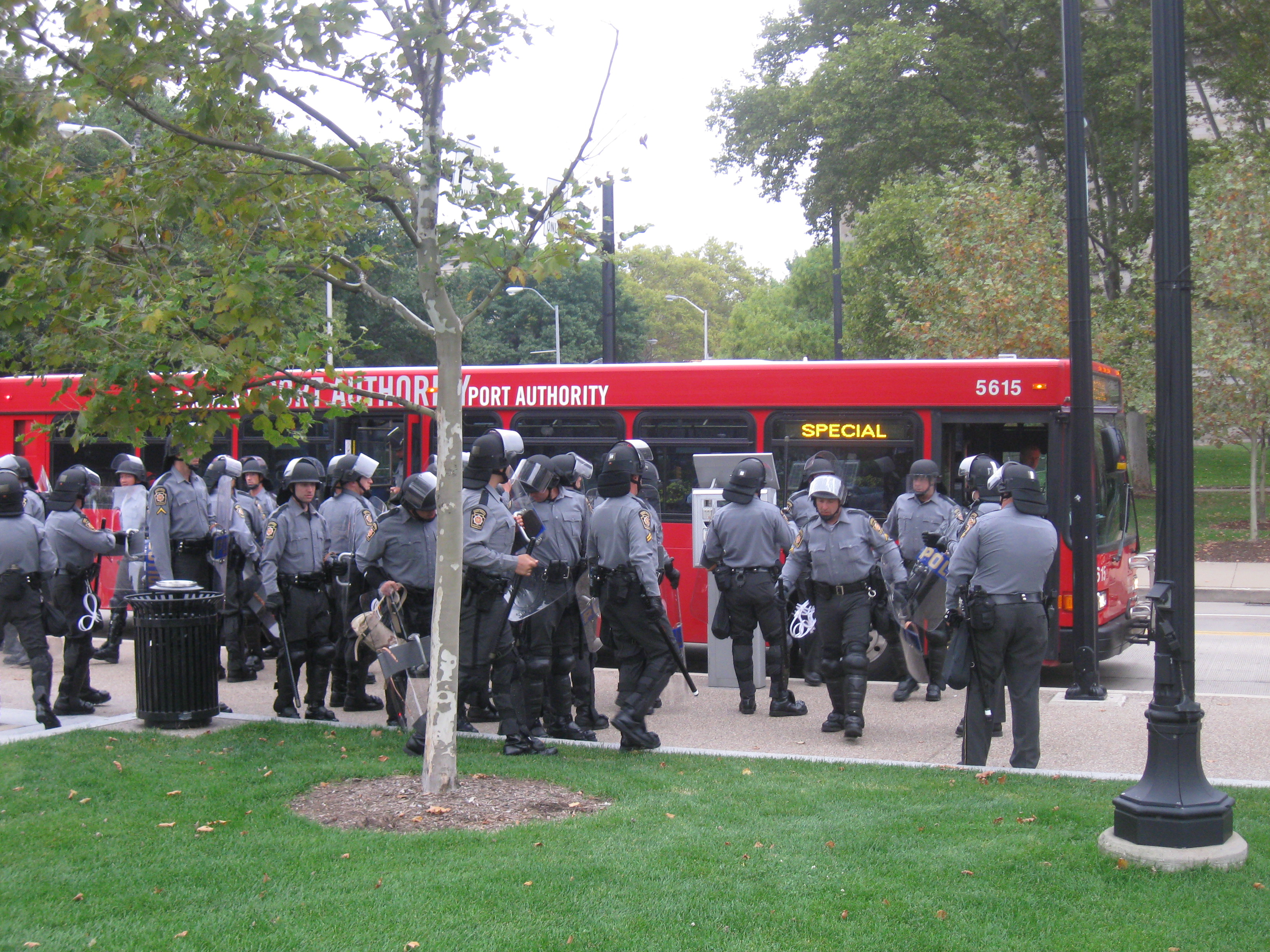
Riot police exit a city bus in the Oakland neighborhood on September 24.

Later in the evening, another small crowd gathered in Schenley Plaza, as world leaders met that evening at the Phipps Conservatory nearby for a working dinner. Hundreds of police swarmed and encircled the peaceful crowd, which spilled over onto Forbes Avenue and Bigelow Boulevard near the Cathedral of Learning. An estimated 300 riot police lined the sidewalk behind the William Pitt Union, with 200 more officers blocking Forbes Avenue nearby to contain the protesters. However, the crowd quickly grew to about 500 as nearby University of Pittsburgh students—evident by shouts of "Let's Go Pitt!" heard—curious about the sirens and police presence, joined the crowd. Police shot several rounds of pepper spray into the crowd. Nearby businesses along Forbes Avenue and Craig Street were also vandalized after the police attempted to break up the demonstration. The University of Pittsburgh alerted students via text message that, "Conditions may be deteriorating in Oakland. Students are advised to remain near their residences."

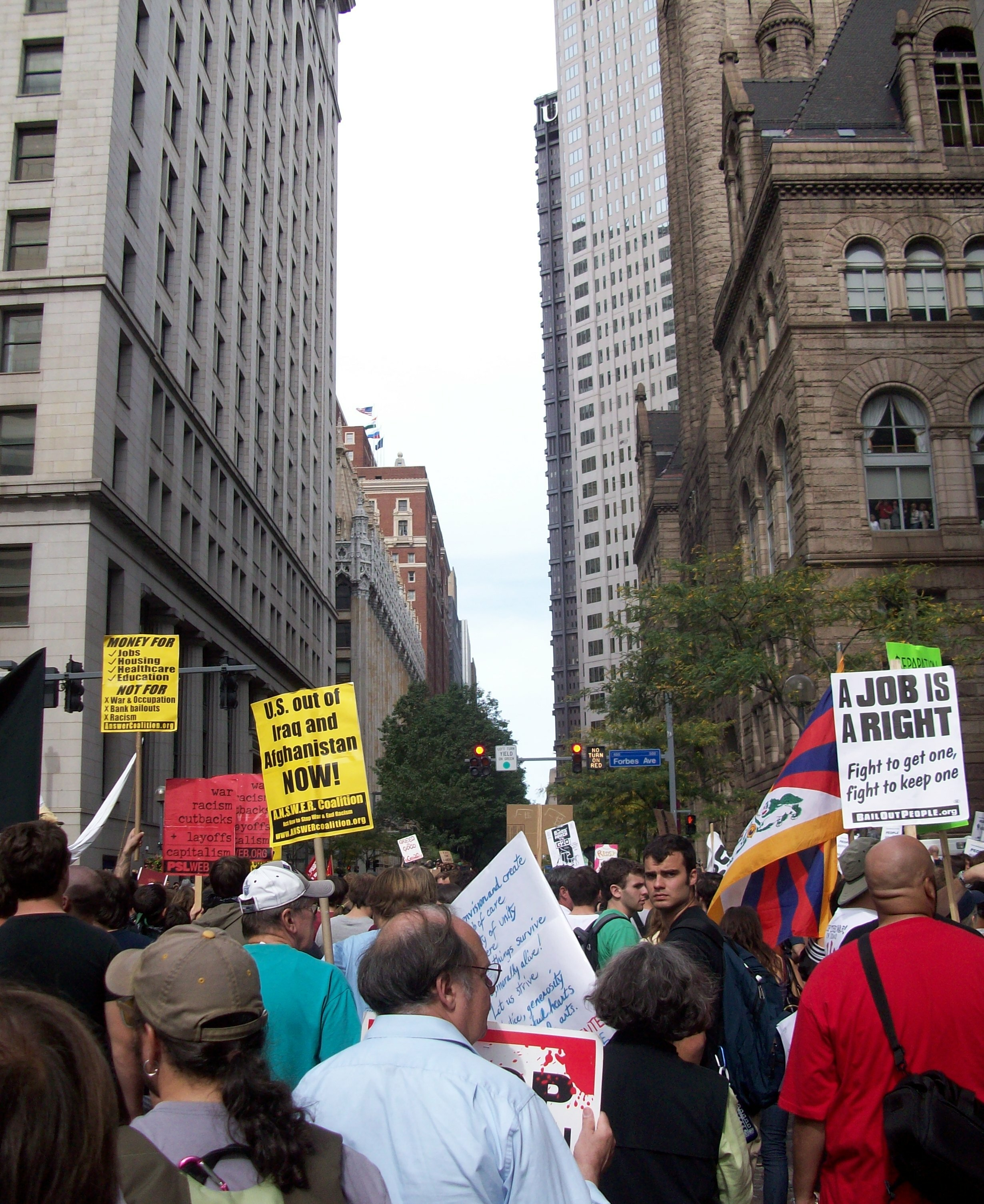
The Peoples' March begins its journey toward East Allegheny, after a series of speakers lectured in front of the City-County Building.

The Pittsburgh G20 Resistance Project called for "Everywhere Protests" at various locations and businesses (mostly banks and large corporations) throughout the city Friday morning (September 25). These were not very large scale protests. Some protesters wore black and twirled hula hoops at Forbes Avenue and Atwood Street in the Oakland neighborhood. There was also a small gathering of protesters at a Starbucks Coffee on Centre Avenue in the city's East Liberty neighborhood as well.

Yet Friday also saw massive actions involving a broad coalition headed by the pacifist-oriented Thomas Merton Center. As one speaker emphasized at the action's start, said, "I remind you, this is a peaceful, permitted march. We're confronting G20 policies, not police." This "Peoples' March" (linked in the minds of many with issues raised in the earlier Peoples' Summit) was punctuated by three rallies (following the route of the march, in Oakland, in downtown Pittsburgh on the steps of City Hall, and on Pittsburgh's North Side), with an estimated 5000 to 8000 participants. The demonstration was quite diverse, including religious and community activists, anarchists, socialists, environmentalists, human rights advocates, opponents of war, trade unionists, veterans, and others. The mood of the action tended to be uncompromisingly critical of the G20, of big corporations, and of capitalism as such. "We're rallying here just a few miles from where the corporate robber barons have settled down to divide up the planet, that group of bankers, financiers and political leaders who have wreaked havoc upon our world," proclaimed one of the speakers, urging listeners to "fight for another world, put people before profits." The crowd roared with approval, and others spoke in a similar vein, but the assembly was completely free from violence and arrests.

Much of the news media tended to minimize peaceful protests, however, and gave greater attention to arrests. These included controversial police actions of Friday evening, after the G20 Summit and the organized protests had ended. Taking place in Schenley Plaza and at the nearby University of Pittsburgh campus, they involved more sweeping arrests, and more charges of police violence, than had been the case the night before.

According to police accounts, about 4,500 people participated in protests throughout the city, with 190 arrests being made. Approximately $50,000 worth of damage was caused to area businesses, with $15,000 worth being attributed to one individual, David Japenga of California, accused of breaking 20 windows and doors in Oakland on Thursday night.

New York City activist Elliott "Smokey" Madison used Twitter to report an order to disperse message from the Pittsburgh police during the protests. Police raided Madison's hotel room, and one week later Madison's New York home, Tortuga House, was raided by FBI agents. Police claim Madison and a co-defendant used computers and a radio scanner to track police movements and then passed on that information to protesters using cell phones and the social networking site Twitter. Madison was charged with hindering apprehension or prosecution, criminal use of a communication facility, and possession of instruments of crime. All protesters that were arrested were processed and held at the State Correctional Institution - Pittsburgh.

=== Response ===
Dozens of University of Pittsburgh students who say they were wrongfully arrested and subjected to heavy-handed police tactics during the G20 meeting called for an investigation into the police actions.

== Outcome ==
One of the first major announcements to come out of the meeting was that the group will become the new permanent council for international economic cooperation. This means that the much larger G20 meeting will essentially replace the smaller G8, which will continue to meet on major security issues but will carry reduced influence. This decision will help to include major developing nations – such as China, India and Brazil – which were originally not included in the G8.
