= Curious George Brigade =

American anarchist collective

A graphical spoof of the Curious George children's book series

The Curious George Brigade (CGB) was an anarchist collective active in the 2000s associated with post-left anarchy and affiliated with CrimethInc., who published their 2003 book Anarchy in the Age of Dinosaurs.

A CGB member, Elliott "Smokey" Madison, was arrested on September 24, 2009 in Pittsburgh and had his Jackson Heights, Queens home (the anarchist collective known as Tortuga House) raided by the Federal Bureau of Investigation and the Joint Terrorism Task Force on October 1, 2009.

== Writings ==
- Anarchy in the Age of Dinosaurs (2003)
- A Swarm of Butterflies: A Fierce Defense of Chaos in Direct Action (2002)
- The End Of Arrogance: Decentralization and Anarchist Organizing (2002)
- The Inefficient Utopia, or How Consensus Will Change the World (2003)
- Liberate Not Exterminate (2005)
- Insurrectionary Mutual Aid (retrieved February 28, 2014)
