= Saw-tooth roof =

Roof comprising a series of ridges with dual pitches on either side

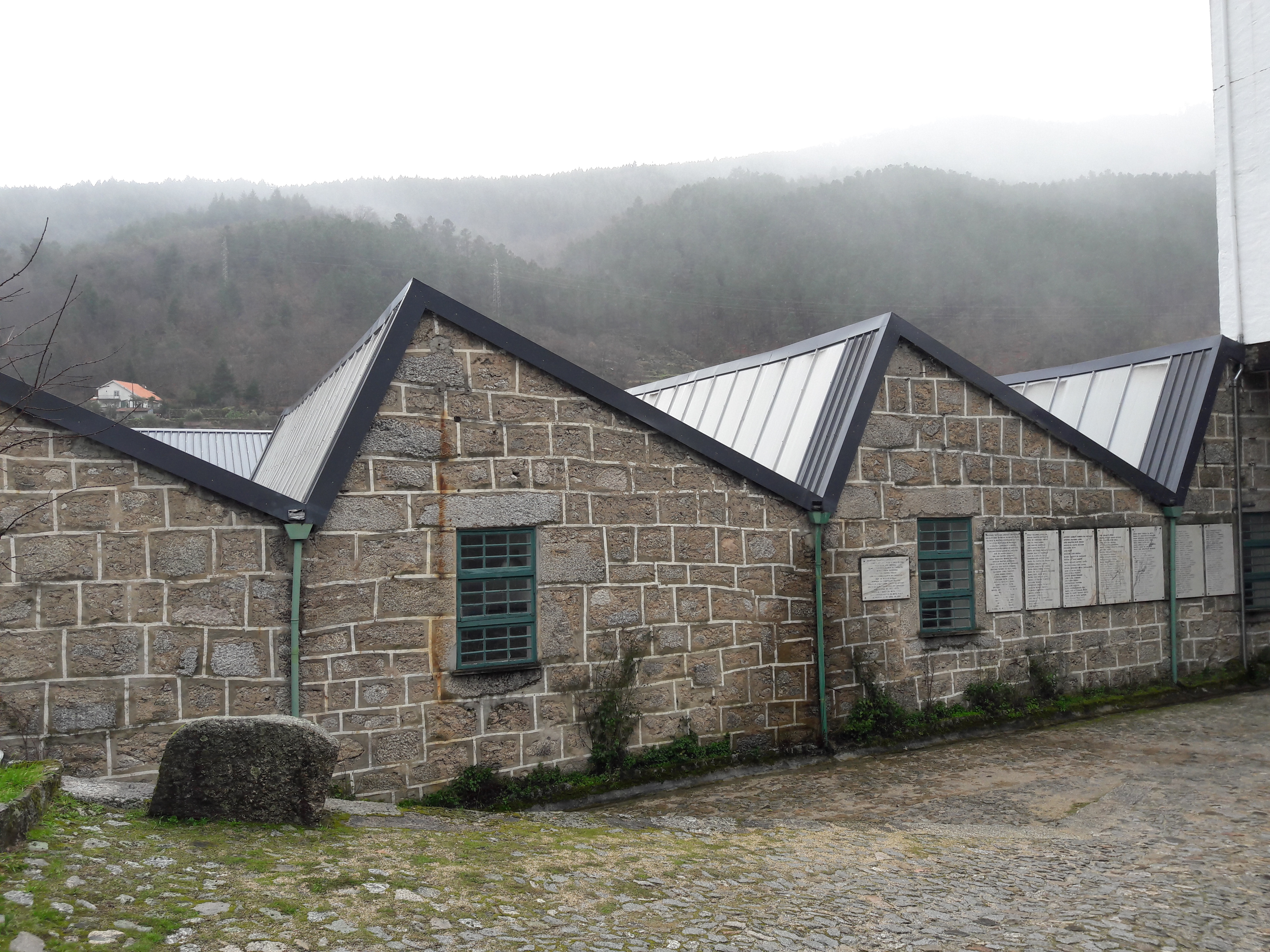
An example of the sawtooth form is this factory in Manteigas, Portugal

A saw-tooth roof is a roof comprising a series of ridges with dual pitches either side. The steeper surfaces are glazed to admit daylight and face away from the equator to shield workers and machinery from direct sunlight. This kind of roof admits natural light into a deep plan building or factory. It was therefore most commonly built during the Machine Age from the mid-nineteenth century to the mid-twentieth, when electrification of factories was not yet common.

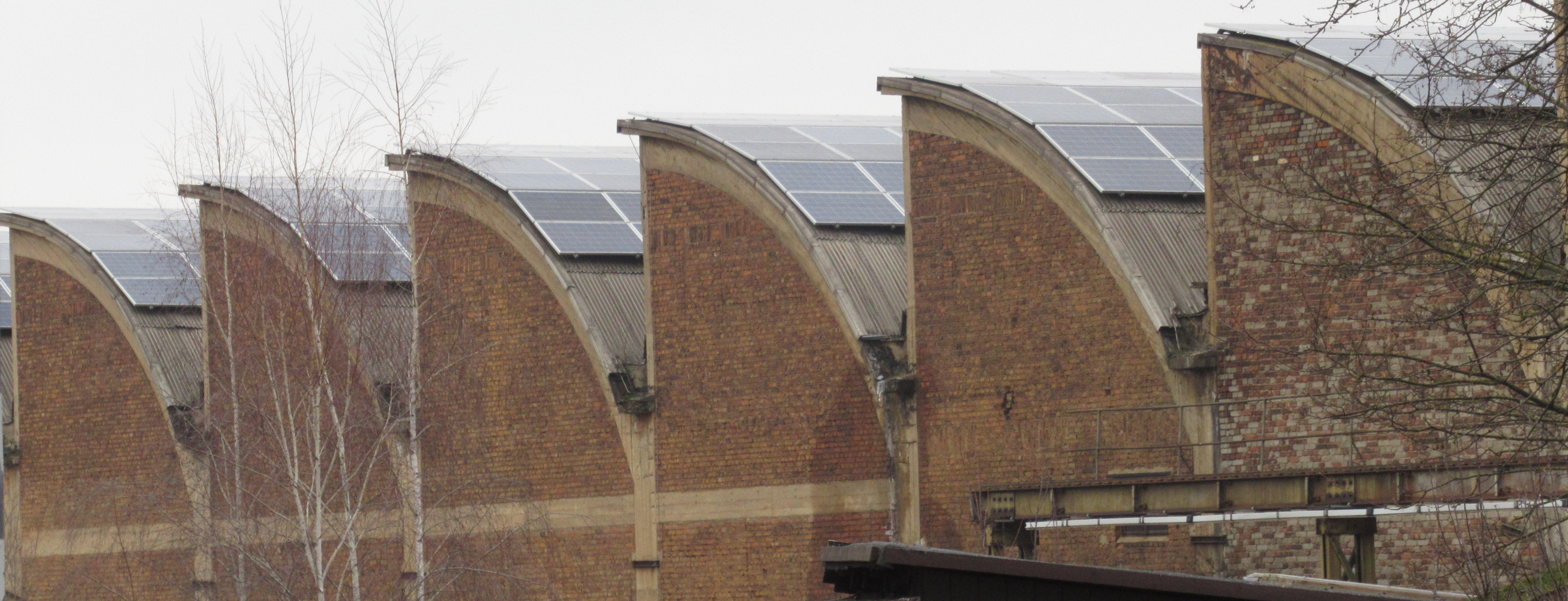
KET-hall in Weimar

Many factories of the era had little or no electrical wiring; their main power sources for the machinery were often steam engines driving line shafting, and the lighting was chiefly via daylighting through the windows. Work done at night, when necessary, was typically lit by oil lamps and candles, but many factories closed for the night. Their norm of an early working day (for example, 6 a.m. to 4 p.m.) was not merely a tradition but a functional decision based on this reliance on daylighting. The same was true of the farmer's workday, for the same reason.

== Advantages ==
Sawtooth roofs have become iconographic of factories and manufacturing, and pictograms representing factories often depict them.

Before electric light substituted for daylight in the late 19th century, consideration of good daylight strategies was essential. The sawtooth roof, with its glass panels facing away from the equator, blocks the light and heat of direct sun exposure and provides uniform, natural light over a large area. Historically they were used in industrial and manufacturing buildings as the primary light source. Some architects think that sawtooth roofs look best when grouped in rows of three or more.

Sawtooth roofs allow efficient use of headroom and floor space. It is easy to install beams, columns and attractive elevations in the design of the roof. Sawtooth roofs provide for maximum headroom compared to flat roofs.

== History ==
=== 19th century ===
British engineer and architect William Fairbairn is sometimes credited with the first designs for what he termed the shed principle possibly as early as 1827. In his "Treatise on Mills and Millwork", of 1863, Fairbairn stated that, "Contemporaneous with the architectural improvements in mills [from 1827], the shed principle lighted from the roof, or the "saw-tooth" system, came into operation. It was chiefly adapted for power-weaving..." It was rapidly adopted during the industrial revolution for the many new daylight factories where good natural lighting was essential in the manufacturing process and large areas of enclosed space were required to house the machinery. The first documented example can be found on the Weaving Shed (and perhaps also the Combing Shed) of Titus Salt's Saltaire Mills near Bradford, which were founded in 1851.

=== Decline and readoption ===
There was a decline in its use when artificial lighting became prevalent, but the design re-emerged in the last quarter of the 20th century and early 21st century, as architects and designers placed greater importance and value in introducing natural light into buildings for environmental efficiency.

Reasons for the renewed interest in daylighting include the high cost of fossil fuels and the realization that sources of electricity have a finite life. Less tangible aspects of daylighting relate more to the human spirit and quality of life.

The sawtooth design has won praise for its potential for renewable energy. Judges of the British Construction Industry's award recognised that the distinctive shape offers potential for solar panels to be installed.

Sawtooth roofs, in which opaque modular elements are combined with transparent surfaces, whether inclined or in various shapes, have become prevalent again. The exact dimensioning of these roofs is extremely important both in terms of energy savings, due to the reduction in electricity needed for artificial lighting, and as regards vision quality.

== Examples ==
The Central Telephone Exchange, Melbourne, built approximately 1919, provides an early example of a reinforced concrete sawtooth roof.

The Sawtooth Building is located at 930 Dwight Way, Berkeley, California, and also known as the Kawneer Manufacturing plant. Early 20th-century industrial buildings in Japan often feature this design. A sketch of the saw-tooth roof form is available from the Ministry of the Environment in New Zealand.

== See also ==
- List of roof shapes
- North light (architecture)
