= National Conference on Organized Resistance =

The National Conference on Organized Resistance (NCOR) was an annual event that brought together activists from a variety of issues, struggles, ideologies and backgrounds for a weekend of learning and reflecting on the state of progressive movements occurring locally, nationally and worldwide. Through diverse workshops, panel discussions, skillshares, tabling, and the creation of an open and safe space, NCOR sought to promote organized action amongst participants against the injustices and inequalities that are confronted in people's daily lives and in the world. NCOR was held on the main campus of American University in northwest Washington, DC, from 1998 to 2008.

While the overall political mood of the conference was that of anarchism, the event drew both speakers and participants across the spectrum of the left - from the International Socialist Organization to the Catalyst Project to the Green Party.

In October 2008, it was announced that future NCOR events were indefinitely canceled due to no current American University students volunteering to be part of the next organizing collective.
