= North light (architecture) =

Light entering a building from the north

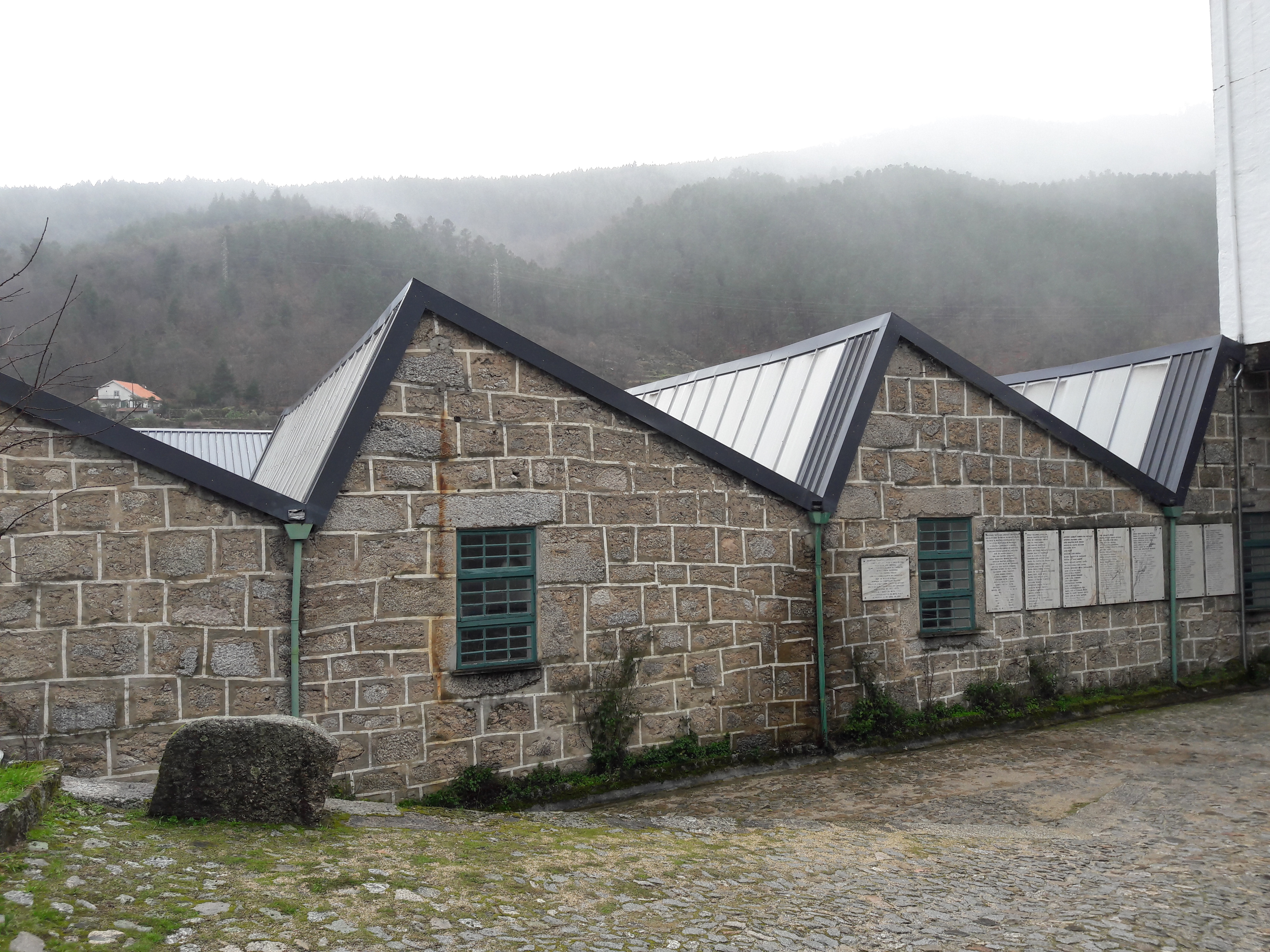
A northlight roof, or saw-tooth roof. The slope with the greater pitch includes glass panels to admit indirect light; the slope with the lesser pitch does not.

North light (in the Northern Hemisphere) is sunlight coming through a north-facing window. Because it does not come directly from the sun, it remains at a consistent angle and colour throughout the day and does not create sharp shadows. It is also cooler than direct sunlight due to the way the Earth's atmosphere scatters light via Rayleigh scattering.

These properties make it the natural light of choice in certain styles of architecture, painting and photography. In addition, the cool colour of north light has been studied for its effect on our perception of art in galleries and museums.

South of the equator (in the Southern Hemisphere), the same characteristics are seen in south light.

== Formation and properties ==
Because the sun passes to the south of most observers in the northern hemisphere, north light is the light coming from the sky, rather than directly from the sun. This is the reason for its diffused nature, as well as why it casts softer shadows than direct sunlight and remains more consistent in colour than light from the east or west (which would be affected by sunrise and sunset respectively).

The colour of diffused daylight is 5500 - 6500K, meaning that north light is cooler (more blue tinted) than light from other directions. The main cause of this is Rayleigh scattering, which was first mathematically described by British physicist Lord Rayleigh (John William Strutt) in 1871. Earth's atmosphere contains large proportions of nitrogen and oxygen which, via Rayleigh scattering, scatter short wavelengths of electromagnetic radiation more efficiently than longer wavelengths. Thus, light scattered or diffused away from the main beam of sunlight appears cooler while direct light (especially during sunlight or sunset) appears warmer.

North light is also less bright than direct sunlight, as only a portion of incoming white light is scattered. The brightness of north light can be between 10,000 and 30,000 lux, depending on location and season, while direct sunlight can be as bright as 100,000 lux.

== In architecture ==
The use of natural light in architecture is called daylighting. It first rose to professional importance during the Roman Empire, when architects struggled to improve the ambience of public and religious spaces while reducing glare. At first, this involved physical structures such as clerestory windows and roof slits, however by the first century CE the direction of light began to play a bigger role. The Pantheon, rebuilt during the reign of emperor Hadrian (117CE – 138CE) employs an oculus (roof window) to let in unobstructed but diffused light, much like a modern north-facing window or skylight would.

Because the sun moves to the south of buildings in the Northern Hemisphere, the northern side of these buildings is always in the shade. For daylighting, this has certain implications:

- North-facing rooms can feel dark and cool. This can be controlled by painting the room a bright colour such as red, yellow, and orange, finishing the room with wood or by using larger windows.
- In addition, north light does not change colour (warmth) throughout the day, so whichever mood is achieved through the room's painted colour, it is likely to remain constant.
- As north light is more diffuse than direct sunlight, it poses less problems with glare. This makes it suitable for office spaces, home theatres or reading rooms. This advantage can help with the previous point – less glare means that larger windows can be used without the need for exterior shading.
- Infrequently used rooms such as laundries, hallways and bathrooms can be oriented north. This would free up south-facing floor plan space for rooms used more often such as living areas and kitchens.

In addition, the latitude of a building changes the effect of north light. Near the equator, the only difference between north and south light may be seasonal. In temperate regions, the implications above apply year-round. In polar areas, they may be even more extreme. For example, Anchorage in Alaska receives only five hours of sunlight at winter solstice, with the sun rising only 5.5 degrees above the horizon. This would make north-facing windows too dark to be of any use during winter.

=== Passive housing ===
Houses that rely on sunlight, wind and insulation to regulate their temperature (as opposed to artificial cooling and heating) are known as passive houses. Because of its lower brightness and lower amount of infrared radiation, north light transmits less warmth to buildings than direct sunlight does. This makes large north-facing windows better suited for passive houses in warm, tropical climates, as it allows living areas to receive ample sunlight without overheating the building.

== In painting ==
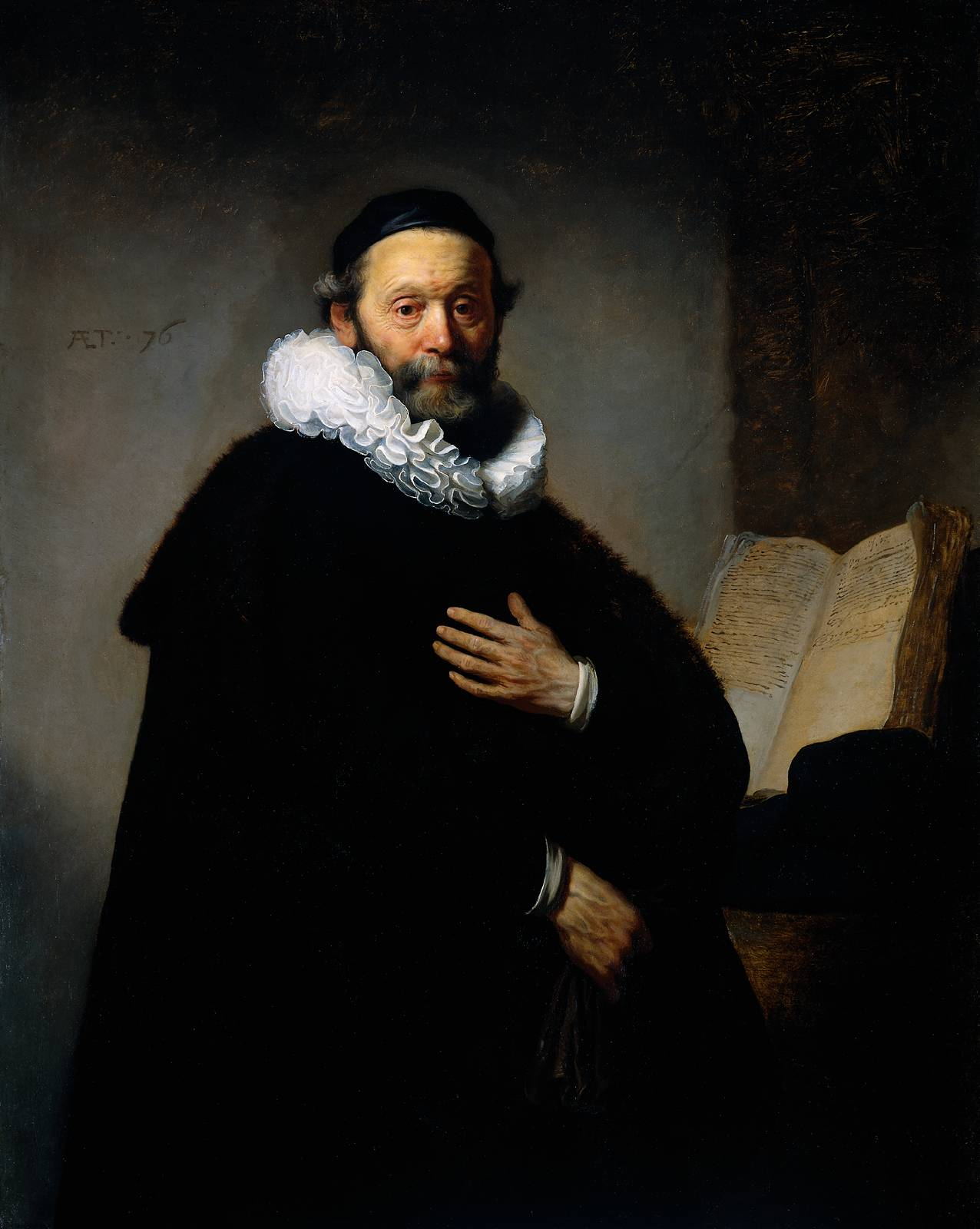
Rembrandt's Portrait of Johannes Wtenbogaert (1633) is an example of Rembrandt lighting - diffused light hits the subject from the viewers' left, but some is reflected back onto the subject, creating definition in the subject's face on the viewers' right.

North light has been an important feature in painting studios before the development of electric lights, but its use continues to this day. Much like in architecture, light direction is important for the mood of a painting, but the light's ambience is even more critical. This is because rays of sun entering from the east, west and south change shape and direction during the day. A complex scene would be very difficult to paint while the shadows and reflections move. Furthermore, accurately depicting harsh light requires a large dynamic range (difference in darkness between blacks and whites) which most traditional paints can not reproduce.

Italian Renaissance painter Leon Battista Alberti alluded to this lack of dynamic range in 1435, writing that "no surface should be made so white that you cannot make it [...] whiter still". However, it was Leonardo da Vinci who first wrote about studio lighting in detail. By 1492 he had discovered the adaptation of the human pupil to darkness, noting that "the eye perceives and recognises the objects with greater intensity [when] the pupil is more widely dilated". Following this, he painted in a dimly lit studio and avoided harsh southern light. The effects of this soft, dim lighting can be seen in later works such as the Mona Lisa.

The use of specifically northern, rather than merely dim light became more common during the Dutch Golden Age with painters such as Rembrandt and Johannes Vermeer. This can be seen in works such as Vermeer's The Milkmaid.

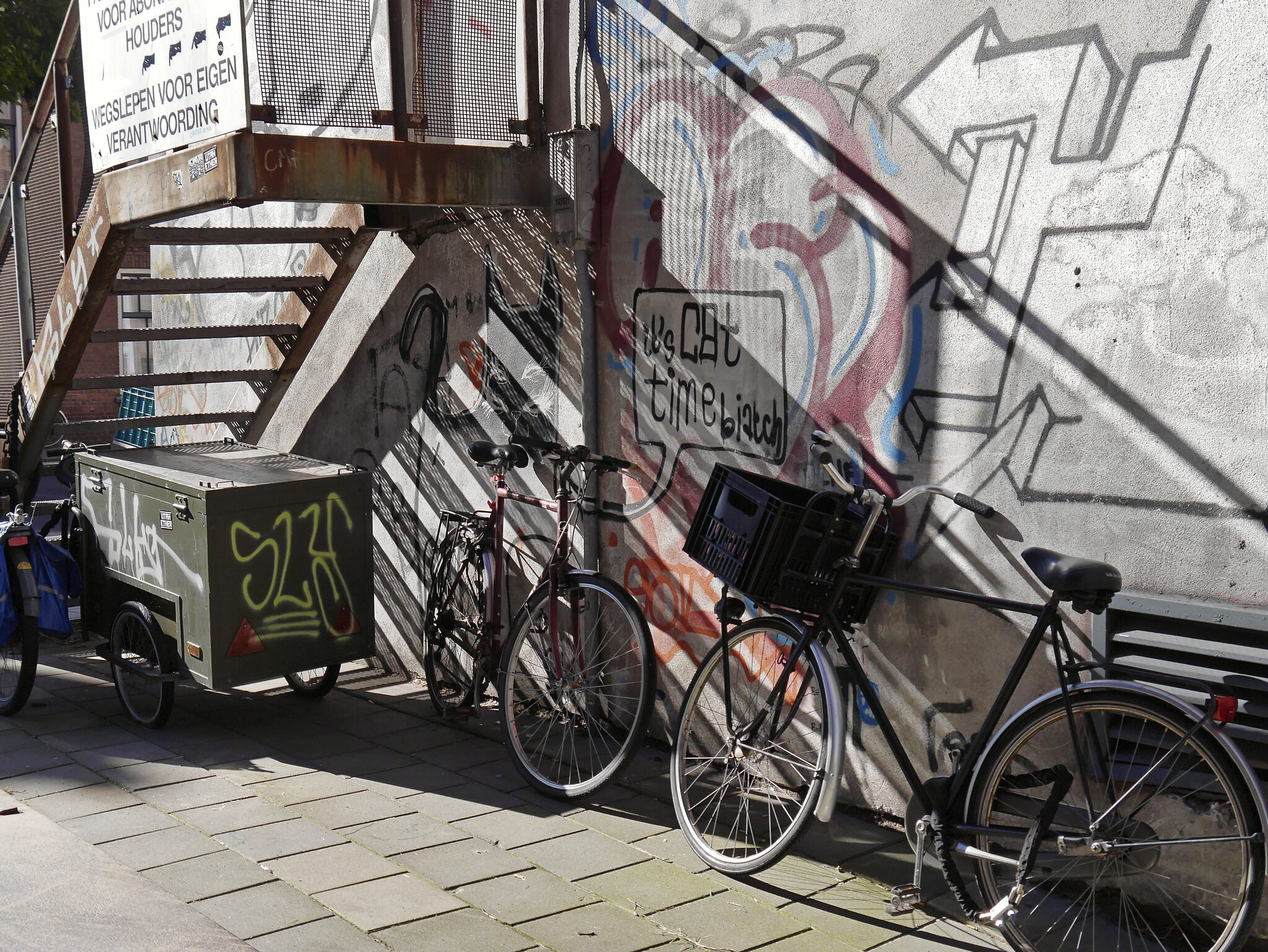
Direct sunlight casts sharp shadows such as these. As they create dark lines and move during the day, such lighting is often difficult for painters to work with.

Artists without access to north facing windows have developed alternative solutions to replicate some of the desirable properties of north light for painting. These include:

- Diffusing direct sunlight (usually from the south) by adding opaque covers to windows. These covers can be sheets, blinds or even tracing or baking paper, however, they have the potential to affect the light's colour if they are tinted off-white. This may or may not be a desirable effect depending on the artist.
- Painting early or late in the day. While this may add warmth if done close to sunrise or sunset, it allows for diffuse and dim light to be obtained from a south facing window.
- Using artificial lighting such as a daylight lamp or continuous, daylight-balanced studio light. Softboxes can be added to improve diffusion. Artificial lights can be expensive, but allow for greater versatility, as several of them can be arranged to fill in certain shadows and create more customised lighting. This is important when trying to recreate Rembrandt lighting or in fine art reproduction.

However, due to the inverse square law, light falling on an object close to its source (e.g. from an artificial lamp) will decrease in brightness over a shorter distance than light falling on an object further away from its source (e.g. from a north facing window). This is known as falloff, and means that any artificial lighting used must be fairly powerful and positioned a long distance away from the subject in order to accurately imitate north light.

== In photography ==
Photographers use north light for similar reasons as painters but have access to electric lights as well. The use of softboxes and bouncing speedlights against umbrella-shaped diffusers strives to recreate the soft shadows that north light produces. These processes are popular in portrait photography.

The Dutch Golden Age of painting has also left a legacy – since the early 20th century, photographers and filmmakers have used Rembrandt lighting to return some dramatic effect to diffused light, both in portraits and cinema. This entails a key light illuminating the subject (such as a north-facing window) and a reflector facing the other side of the subject. While this lighting was not formally named in Rembrandt's time, it appears in some of his paintings.

Like painters, photographers can modify south light or use artificial lighting as a replacement for north light if needed. However, they can also employ post production software such as Adobe Lightroom and Photoshop to correct exposure and temperature. In addition, dedicated software such as Robin Myers Imaging EquaLight can adjust for lens and lighting falloff, which is especially useful for fine art photographers.

== Effect of art appreciation ==
Before artificial lighting, both the artist and their audience would both see art under natural light (either coming from the north or scattered in some way to reduce glare). However, since the 1980s museums and galleries have become reliant on some degree of electric lighting. This means that the audience may see art differently to how it was intended and may also miss out on observing subtle changes in shadows and highlights as light moves throughout the day.

Studies into art perception have found that the colour correlated temperature (CCT) of north light (~6000K) may be too cool for optimum appreciation of most art. For example, a 2004 study found 3600K to be the preferred temperature – a warm CCT which is commonly used in museums. A 2008 study by the Optical Society of America used different methodology to suggest 5100K as the optimal temperature – although this is still slightly warmer than natural north light.

However, the most comprehensive study on this topic was done by the University of Vienna in 2019. It divided appreciation further into beauty, emotional arousal and interest, and studied both portraits and abstract art. While the findings for portraits suggest a warmer CCT in line with previous studies, a cooler CCT was preferred for abstract art.
