= List of locations in the Port of London =

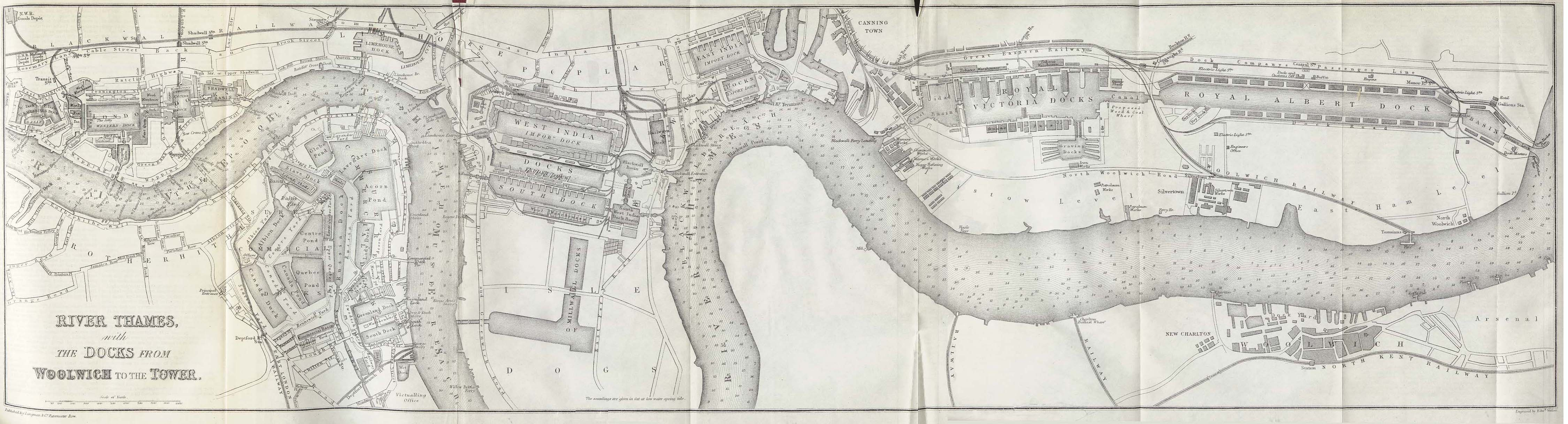
The Docklands in 1882 - a time of great expansion for the Port of London. Much of the Port's operations have now moved further downstream.

This is a list of about 680 former or extant wharves, docks, piers, terminals, etc. of the Port of London, the majority of which lie on the Tideway of the River Thames, listed from upstream to downstream.

Many of the docks closed after the mass uptake of containerisation changed the face of the industry and bringing about an end to an era, and a demise to the occupation of the docker as it then was.

Those marked with a † have at present the status of a safeguarded wharf. Those in italics are no longer used for port or river transit related activities. Further remarks are made in brackets, including in some cases the present operator or cargo handled.

It is estimated that in 1937, at the height of London's trade, there were around 1,700 wharves between Brentford and Gravesend. Today there are around 70 active terminals, each generally handling much greater volumes. Much of the cargo and commodities handling by the Port of London takes place in the downstream stretches of the Thames beyond Greater London, on the banks of south Essex (Thurrock) and north Kent. The Port of London Authority controls operations from its base in Gravesend. The main container terminal is currently at Tilbury, though in 2008 construction began on the London Gateway project, which will become the largest single component of the Port of London when completed.

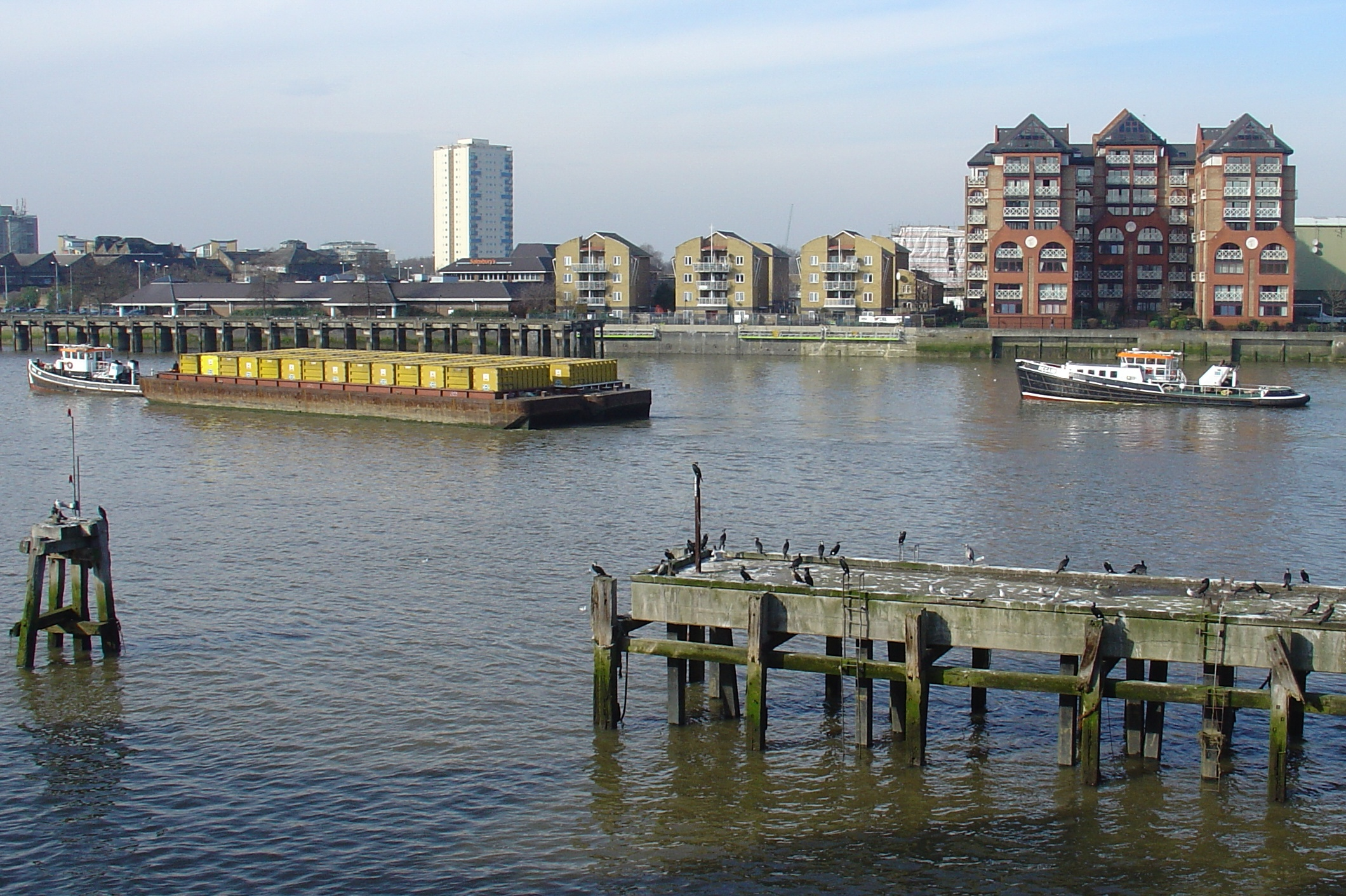
Barges carrying refuse on the river at Battersea, 2007

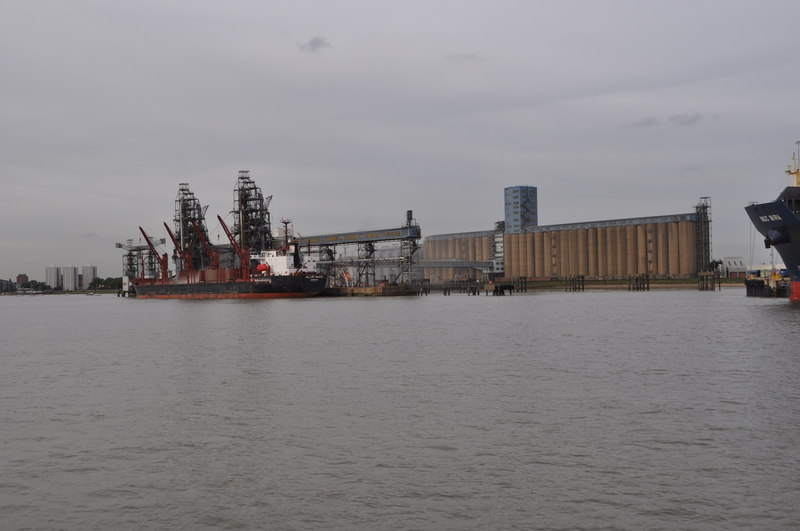
Tilbury Grain Terminal, 2010

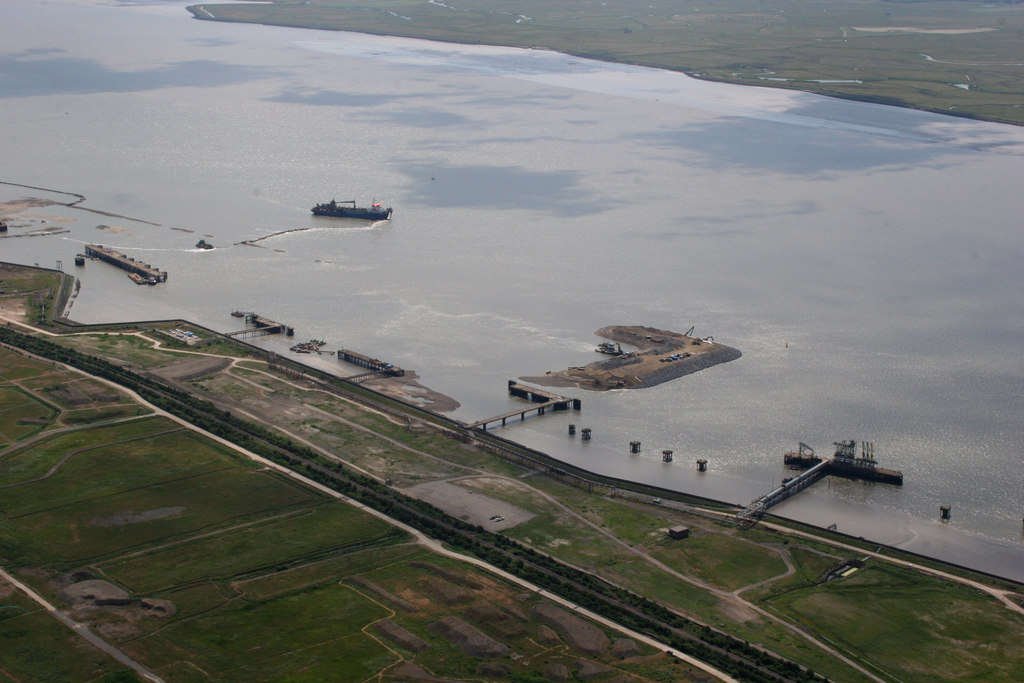
Construction of London Gateway under way, 2010

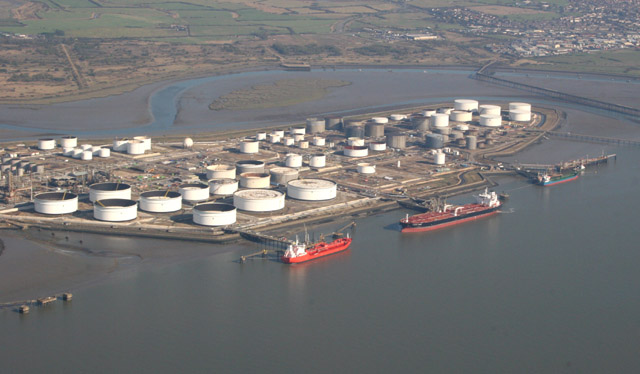
Coryton Oil Refinery, 2007

== South bank ==
=== Kew ===
- Kew Gardens Pier

=== Mortlake and Barnes ===
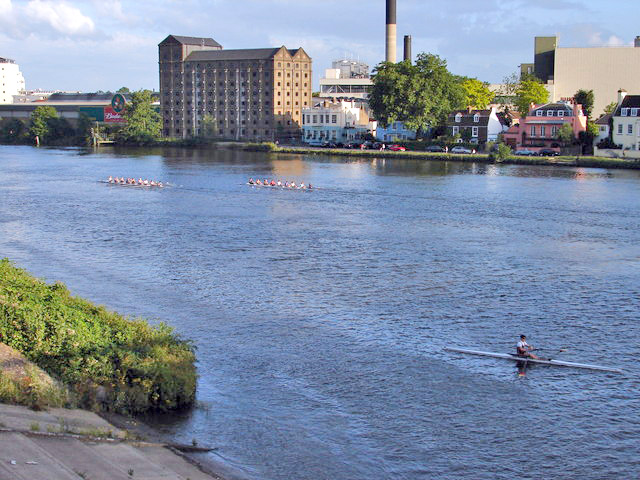
Stag Brewery, Mortlake

(Chiswick Bridge)

- Stag Brewery
- St Mary's Wharf
- site of Mortlake Power Station
- Mortlake Wharf

(Barnes Railway Bridge)

- Small Profits Draw Dock

(Hammersmith Bridge)

- Harrod's Wharf

=== Putney ===
- Putney Pier (TfL river service)

(Putney Bridge)

- Putney Wharf
- Douglas Wharf
- Spaldings Wharf

(Fulham Railway Bridge)

=== Wandsworth ===
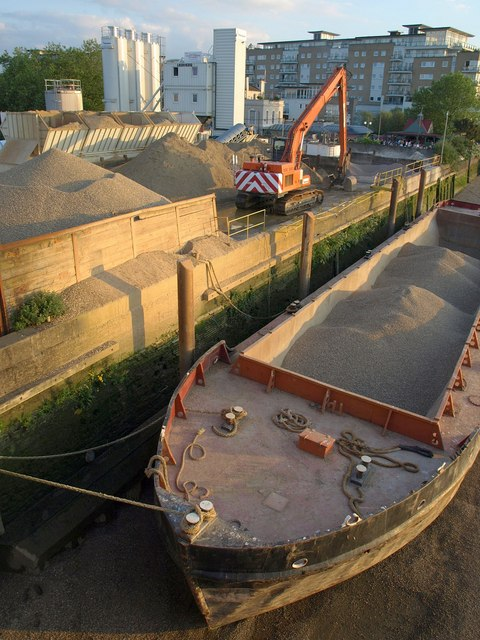
Pier Wharf, Wandsworth, 2010

- River Wandle
- Feathers Wharf
- Western Riverside (solid waste transfer station) †
- Wandsworth Riverside Quarter Pier (TfL river service)
- Pier Wharf †

(Wandsworth Bridge)

=== Battersea ===
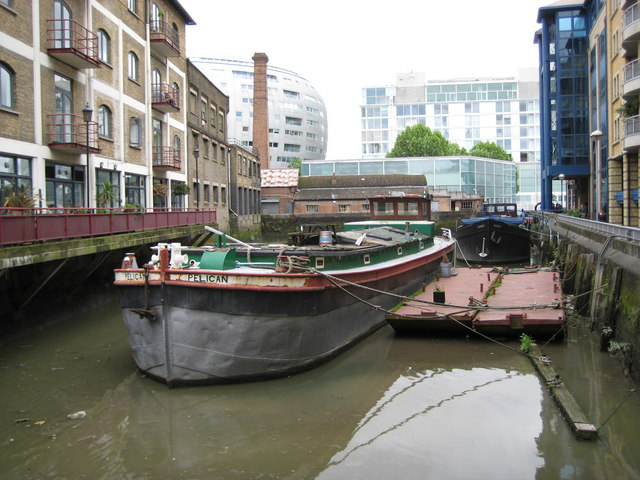
Ransome's Dock, 2008

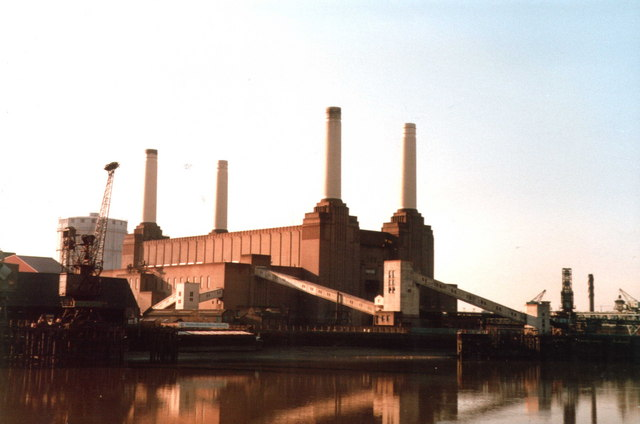
Battersea Power Station showing the coaling pier, 1986

- Sherwood Wharf
- St Mary's Wandsworth Pier, site of Manbre & Gartons works (sugars)
- site of original Price's Candles works
- Shell Wharf
- Bridges Wharf
- Oyster Wharf
- site of jetty for Lombard Road Power Station
- Regent Wharf

(Battersea Railway Bridge)

- site of original Morgan Crucible Company works

(Battersea Bridge)

- site of C & J Fields candle works
- Ransomes Dock
- site of Albert Bridge flour mills

(Albert Bridge)
(Chelsea Bridge)

- Chelsea Bridge Wharf
- Battersea Wharf

(Grosvenor Bridge)

- former Battersea Power Station
- The Battersea Barge
- Cringle Dock †
- Metro Greenham (RMC Battersea) †

=== Vauxhall and Lambeth ===
- Middle Wharf (Cemex Vauxhall) †
- Prescot Wharf
- Bourne Valley Wharf
- St George Wharf

(Vauxhall Bridge)

- Tamesis Dock
- White Hart Draw Dock (river access under the Albert Embankment)
- site of Royal Doulton pottery
- Lambeth River fire station

(Lambeth Bridge)

- Lambeth Pier

(Westminster Bridge)

- Acre Wharf (now County Hall)
- Waterloo Millennium Pier (TfL river service)
- College Wharf
- India Store Depot
- Bangor Wharf

(Hungerford Bridge)

=== Southwark ===
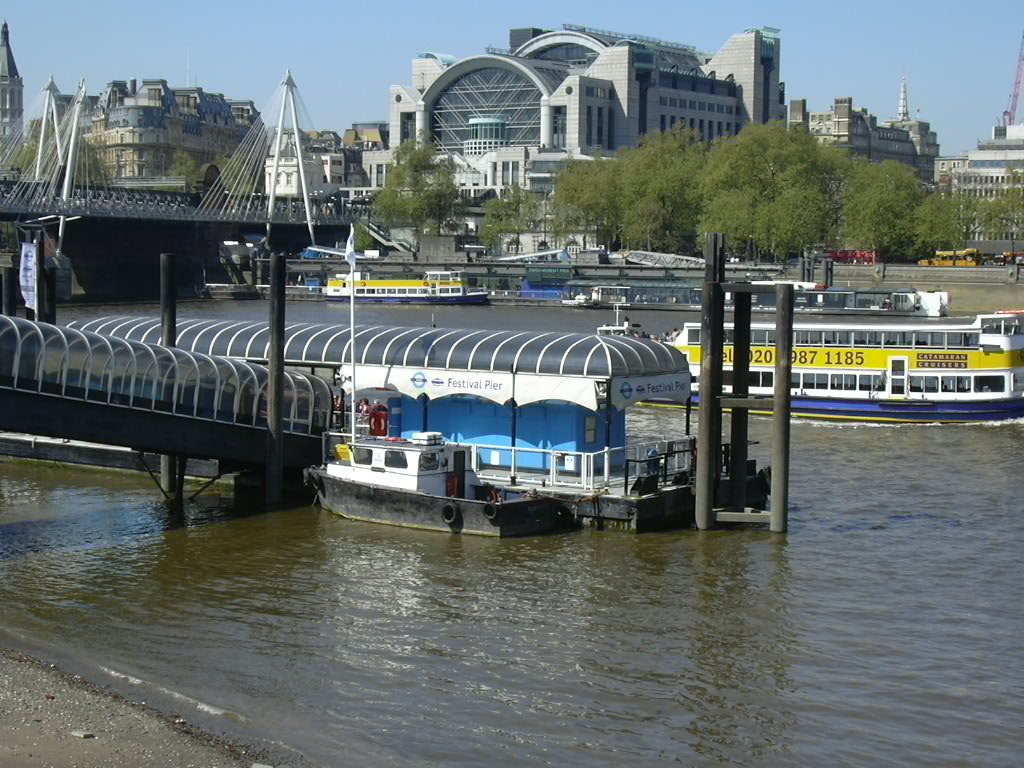
Festival Pier in 2007

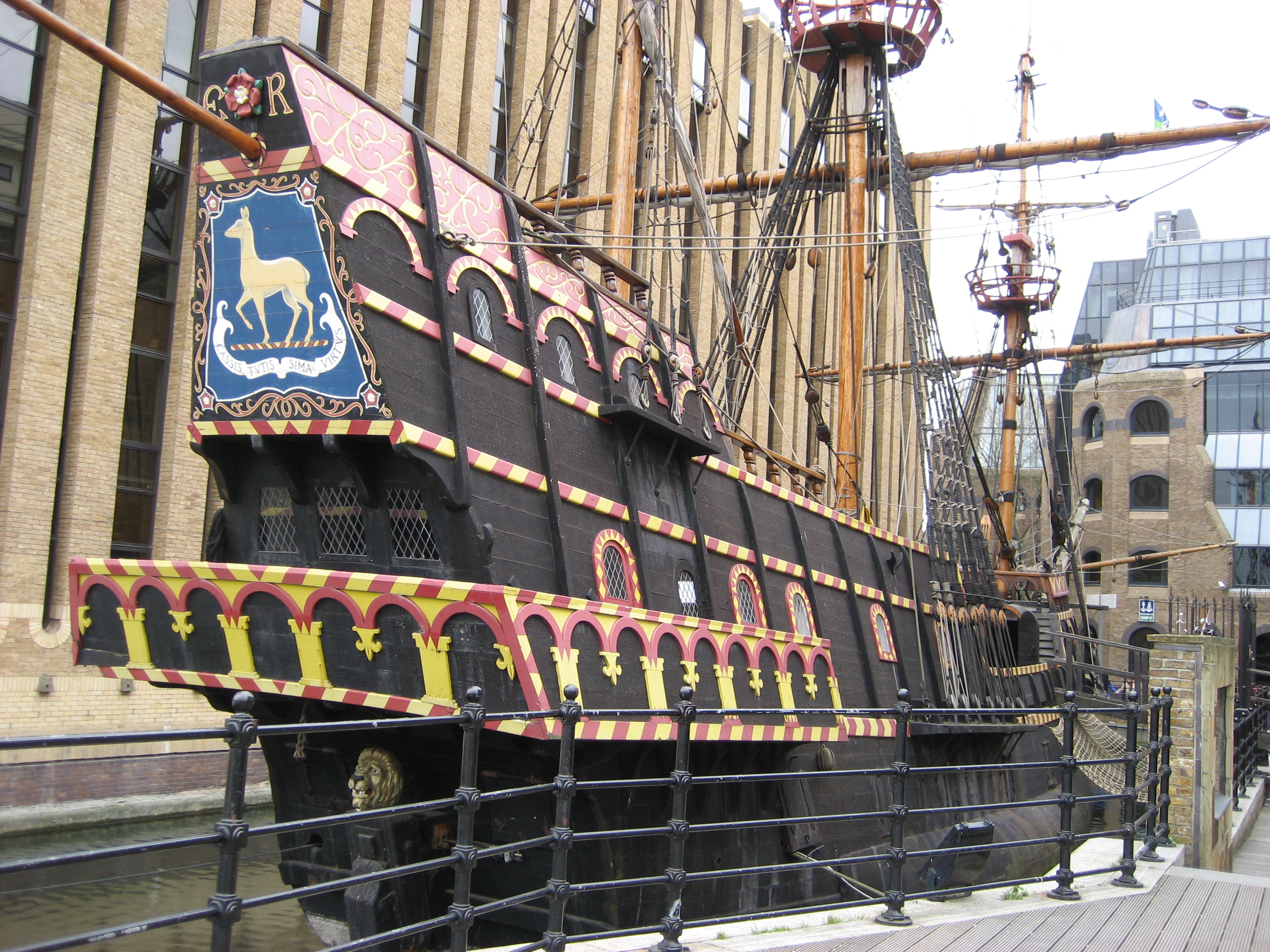
The Golden Hind at St Mary Overie Dock in 2007

- Festival Pier (TfL river service)

(Waterloo Bridge)

- Old Shot Tower Wharf
- Commercial Wharf
- Waterloo Dock
- New Barge House Wharf
- Old Jamaica Wharf
- Old Bull Stairs Wharf
- Greystone Lane Wharf
- Jamaica Wharf
- Blackfriars Bridge Wharf

(Blackfriars Bridge)
(Blackfriars Railway Bridge)

- Foundry Wharf
- Falcon Draw Dock
- Holland Wharf
- Iron Wharf
- Honduras Wharf
- Willow Wharf
- Royal George Wharf
- former Bankside Power Station
- Travers & Crown Wharf
- Queen's Wharf
- Phoenix Wharf

(Millennium Bridge)

- Devonshire Wharf
- Globe Wharf
- British Lion Wharf
- Greenmoor Wharf
- Stone Wharf
- Bankside Pier/Jetty (TfL river service)
- Emmerson Wharf
- Windsor Wharf
- Benbow Wharf
- Sturtivant Wharf
- Bear Wharf
- Bear Garden Wharf
- St Helen's Wharf
- Cast Iron Wharf
- Scott's Wharf
- Universal Wharf

(Southwark Bridge)

- Imperial Wharf
- Southwark Wharf
- Bridge Wharf
- Ceylon Wharf
- Red Lion Wharf
- Lion Wharf
- Carey's Wharf
- Barclay's Brewery
- Bank End Wharf

(Cannon Street Railway Bridge)

- South Eastern Wharf
- Horseshoe Wharf
- Clink Wharf
- Winchester Wharf
- Phoenix Wharf
- Pickfords Wharf
- St Mary Overie Dock
- West Kent Wharf
- Hibernia Wharf

=== Upper Pool ===
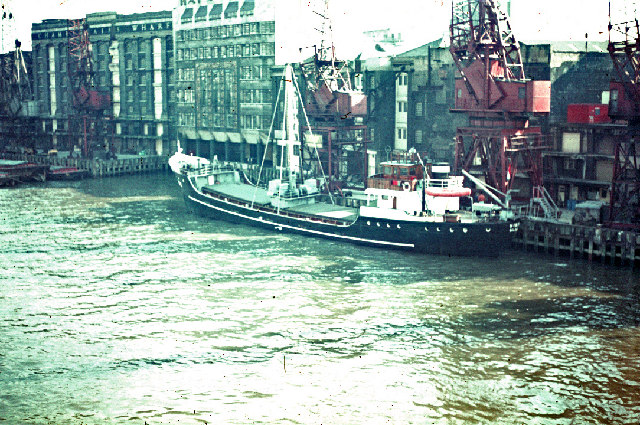
Chamberlain's Wharf (now London Bridge Hospital), Hay's Wharf Offices, Topping's Wharf and Sun Wharf in the 1960s

(London Bridge)

- Fenning's Wharf
- Sun Wharf
- Topping's Wharf
- St Olaf House (Hay's Wharf offices)
- Chamberlain's Wharf
- Cotton's Wharf
- Humphery's Wharf
- London Bridge City Pier/Hays Wharf Pier (TfL river service)
- Hay's Dock and Wharf
- Wilson's Wharf
- Griffin's Wharf
- South Thames Wharf
- Gun & Shot Wharves
- Symon's Wharf
- Stanton's Wharf
- St Olave's Wharf
- Pickle Herring Wharf
- Mark Brown's Wharf
- Tower Bridge Wharf

(Tower Bridge)

=== Bermondsey ===
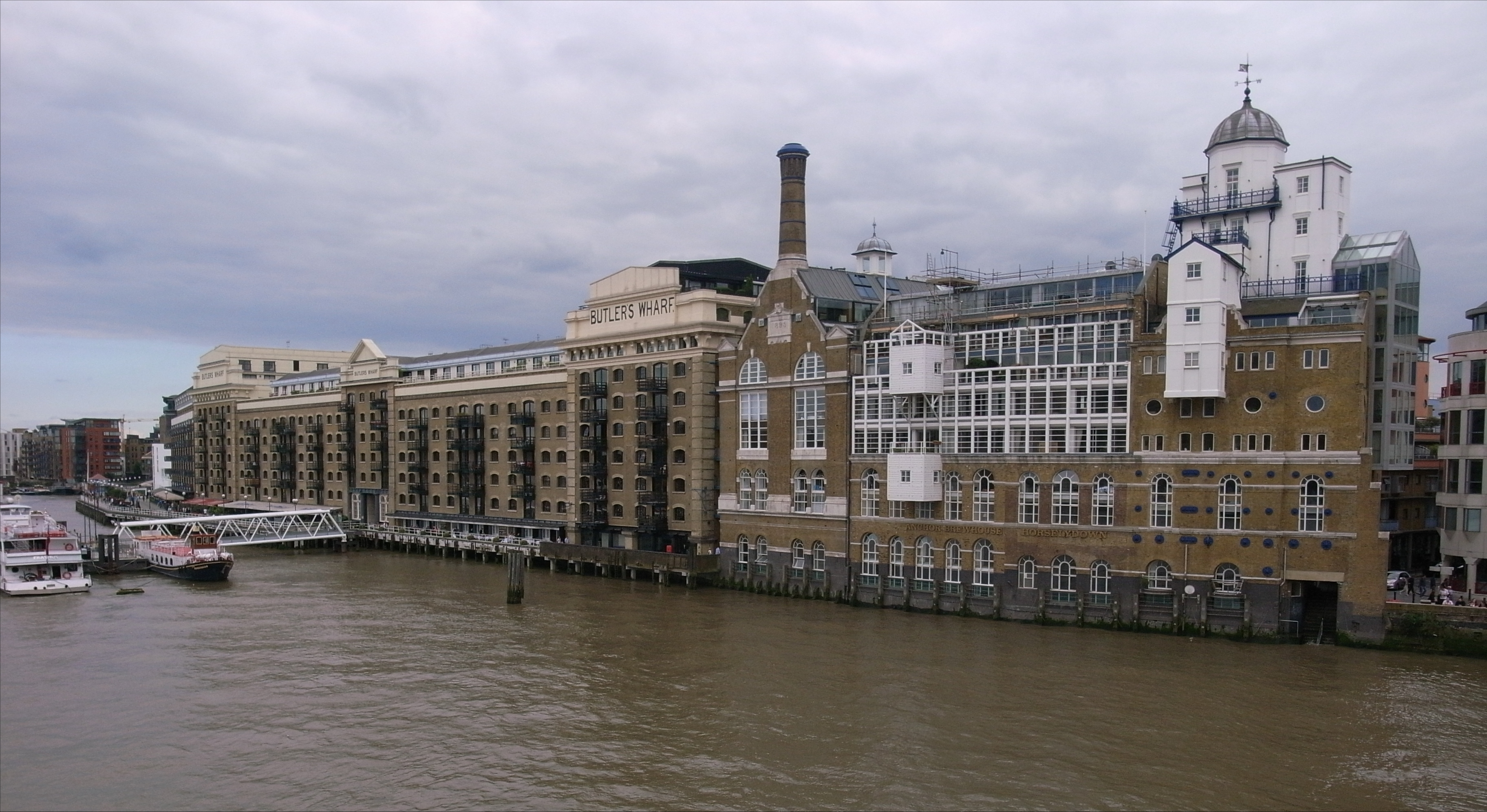
Anchor Brewhouse and Butler's Wharf in 2008

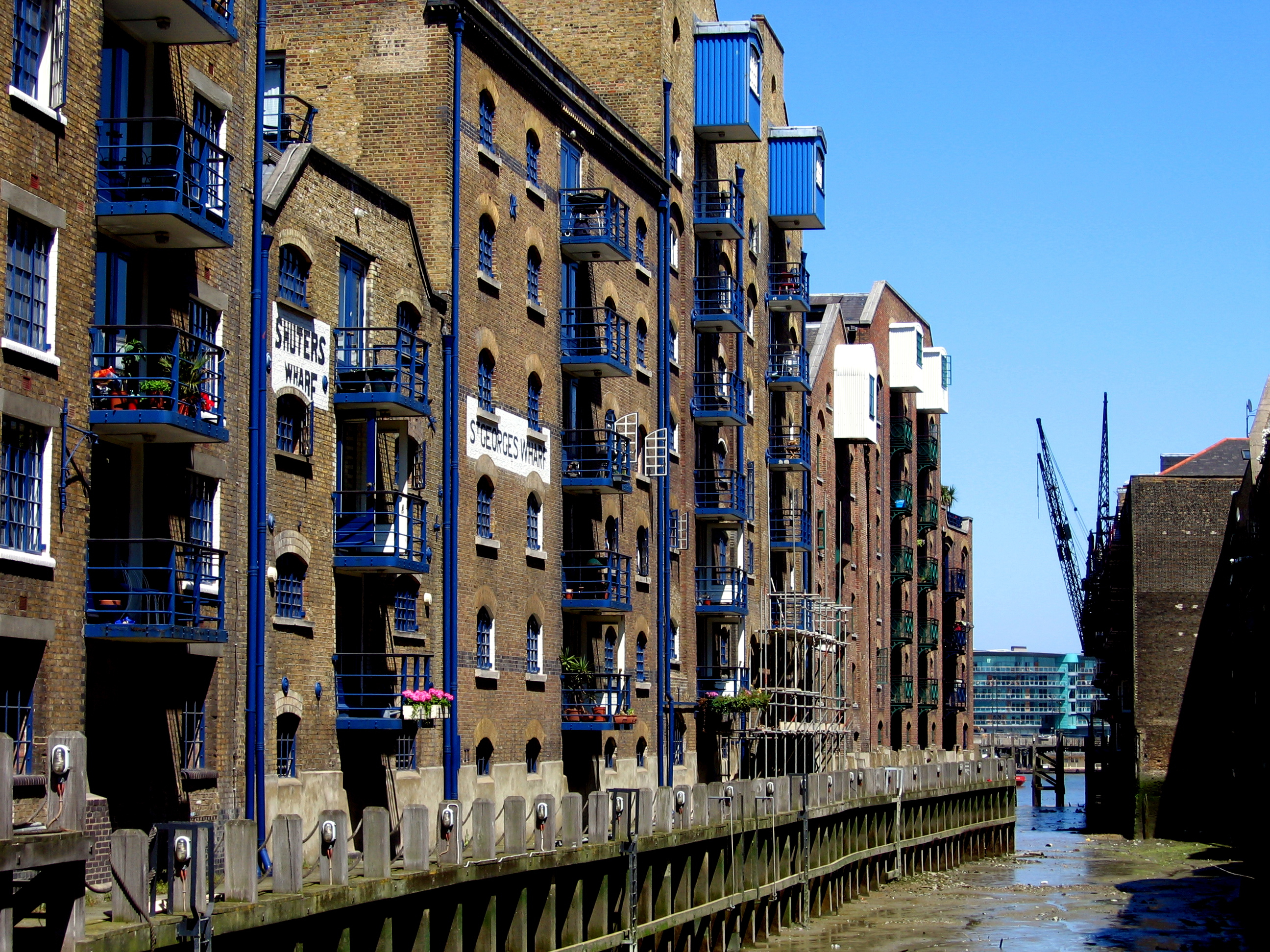
St Saviour's Dock (view north to River Thames).

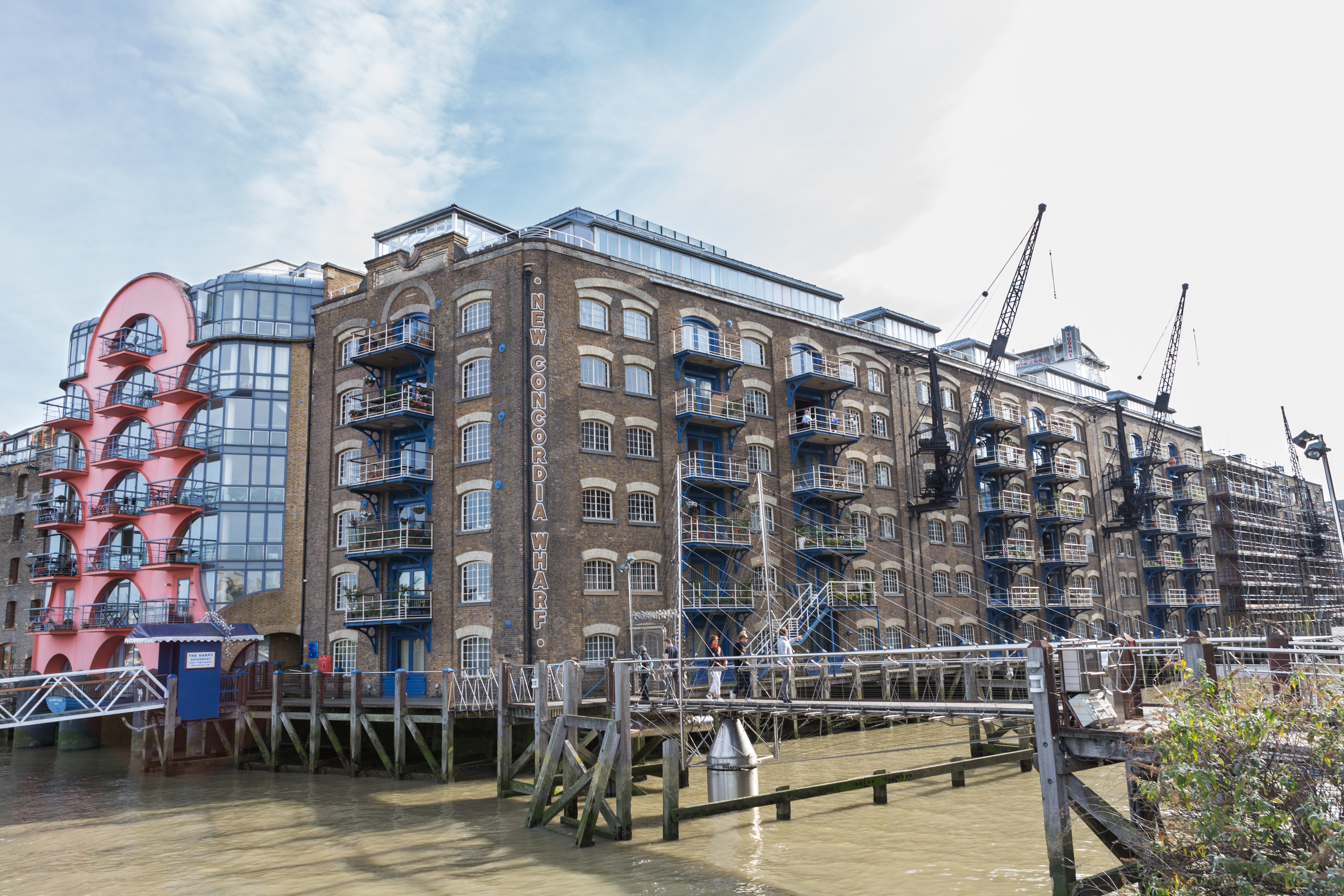
New Concordia Wharf, St Saviours Dock

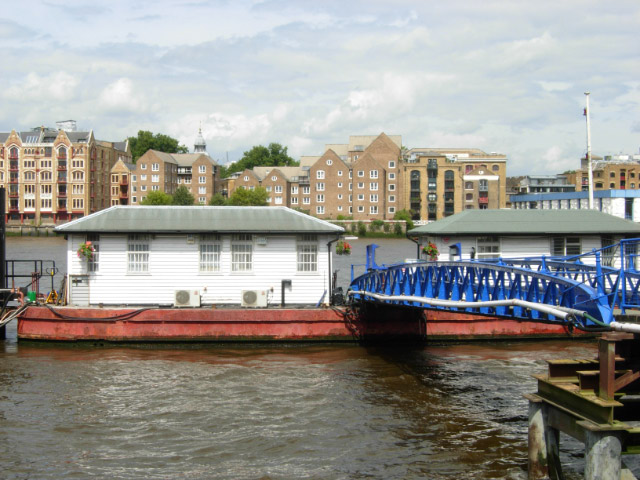
Cherry Garden Pier, Bermondsey

- Burtt's Portland Wharf
- Anchor Brewhouse
- Butler's Wharf
- Horselydown Wharf
- Coventry's Wharf
- Cole's Upper and Lower Wharves
- Newell's Wharf
- Shad Thames
- St Saviour's Dock
- St Andrew's Wharf
- Meriton's Wharf, later New Concordia Wharf
- Reed's Wharf
- Uveco Wharf
- Deverell's Wharf
- Downing's Wharf
- Reed's Lower Wharf
- Redman's Wharf
- Springall's Wharf
- Adlard's Wharf
- Brunswick Wharf, later Sterling Wharf
- Seaborne Coal Wharf
- London Grist Mills
- East Lane Wharf
- Chamber's Wharves
- Bond's Wharf
- Fountain Dock
- Darnell's Wharf
- Fountain Stairs Wharf
- Powell's Wharf
- Farrand's Wharf
- Cherry Garden Wharf
- Cherry Garden Pier
- Lucas and Spencer's Wharf

=== Rotherhithe ===
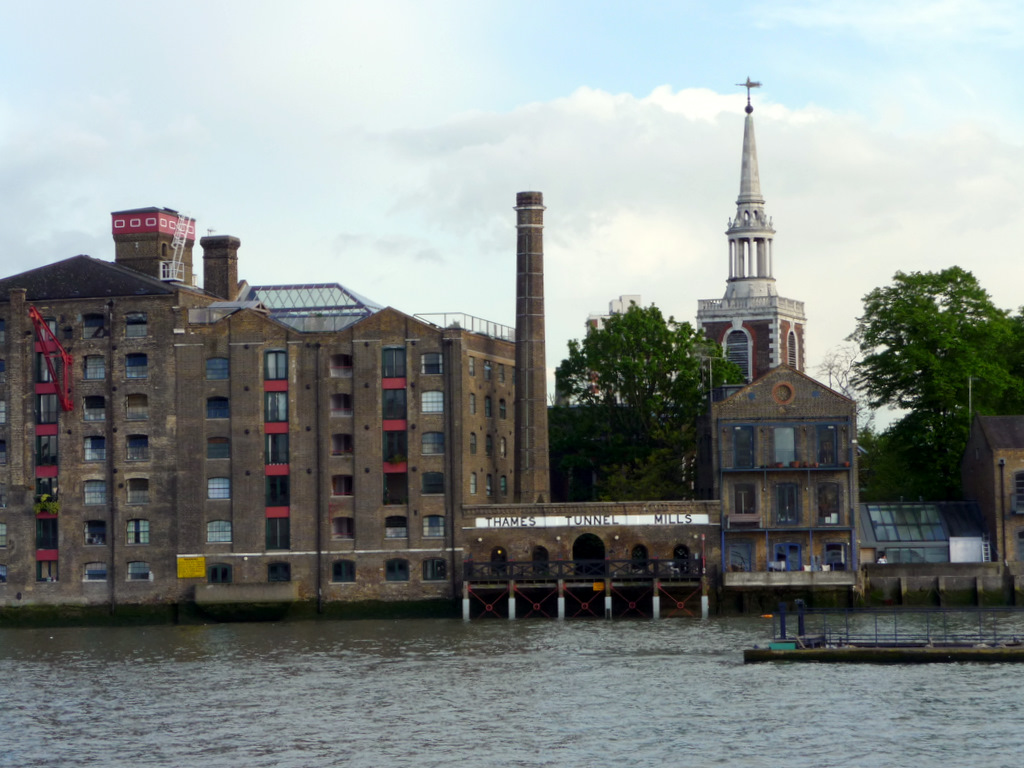
Thames Tunnel Mills, 2009

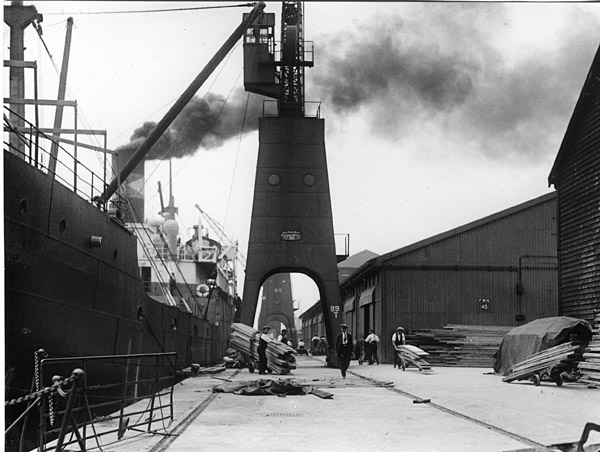
Greenland Dock in 1927

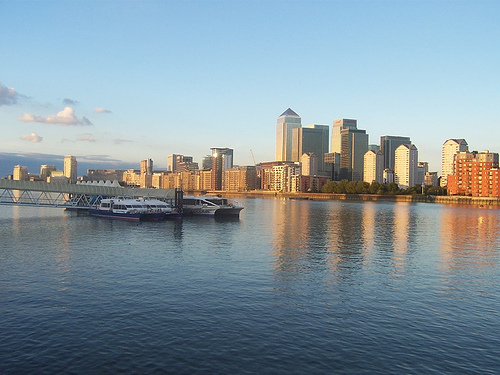
Greenland Pier in 2005, with Canary Wharf in the background

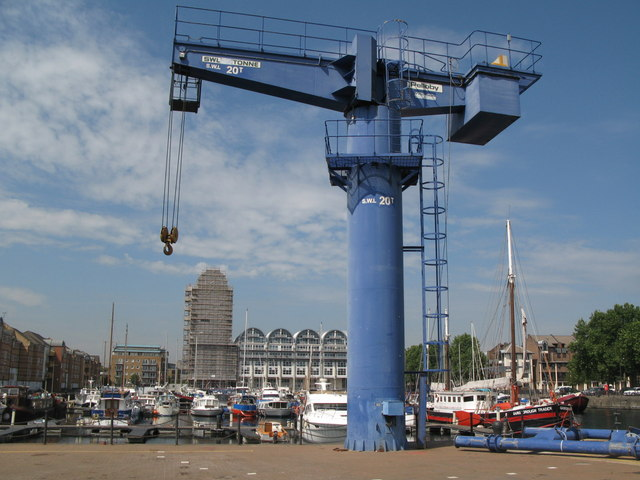
Boat-lifting crane, South Dock

- Corbett's Wharf
- National Wharf
- Platform Wharf
- Platform Sufferance Wharf
- Braithwaite & Dean's Wharf
- Pace's Wharf
- Pocock's Barge Yard
- Cochin Wharf
- Yardley's Wharf
- Matthew's Wharf
- Rotherhithe Wharf
- Cannon Wharf
- Abbot's Wharf
- Gordon's Wharf
- Prince's Wharf
- Carr's Wharf
- Beard's Wharf
- East India Wharf
- Bombay Wharf
- Hope Wharf
- Thames Tunnel Mills
- Grice's Wharf
- Claydon's Wharf
- Genisi's Wharf
- Brandram's Wharf
- Charles Hay's Barge Yard
- Fisher's Sufferance Wharf
- Cumberland Wharf
- Carolina Wharf
- Ransome's Wharf
- Norway Wharf
- Clarence Wharf

(Rotherhithe Tunnel)

- Dinorwic Wharf
- Surrey Commercial Docks
- Surrey Commercial Wharf
- Bull Head Wharf
- King and Queen Wharf
- Bellamy's Wharf
- Prince's Wharf
- Lower King and Queen Wharf
- Upper Globe Wharf (rice); once Upper Globe Dock Shipyard
- Normandy Wharf
- Crown Lead Works
- Horseferry Wharf
- Grand Surrey Wharf
- Lavender Dock shipyard, later Lavender Wharf (Castrol)
- Lavender Lock entrance to Lavender Pond
- Pageant Wharf
- Upper Ordnance Wharf (Enthoven Lead Works)
- Sunderland Wharf
- Cuckold's Point, once site of Limehouse Hole ferry
- Canada Wharf, later Columbia Wharf,
- Nelson Dock Pier
- Nelson Dry Dock
- Danzig Wharf
- Albion Wharf
- Somerset Wharf
- Lawrence's Wharf
- Durand's Wharf
- Trinity Wharf
- Acorn Wharf, later South Wharf
- Barnard's Wharf, later Odessa Wharf
- Commercial Dock Pier later Commercial Pier Wharf
- Atkin's Wharf, Redriff Wharf, later New Caledonian Wharf
- Greenland Dock
- Greenland Dock Pier
- South Dock Marina
- St George's Wharf later site of Manganese Bronze and Brass works

=== Deptford and Deptford Creek ===
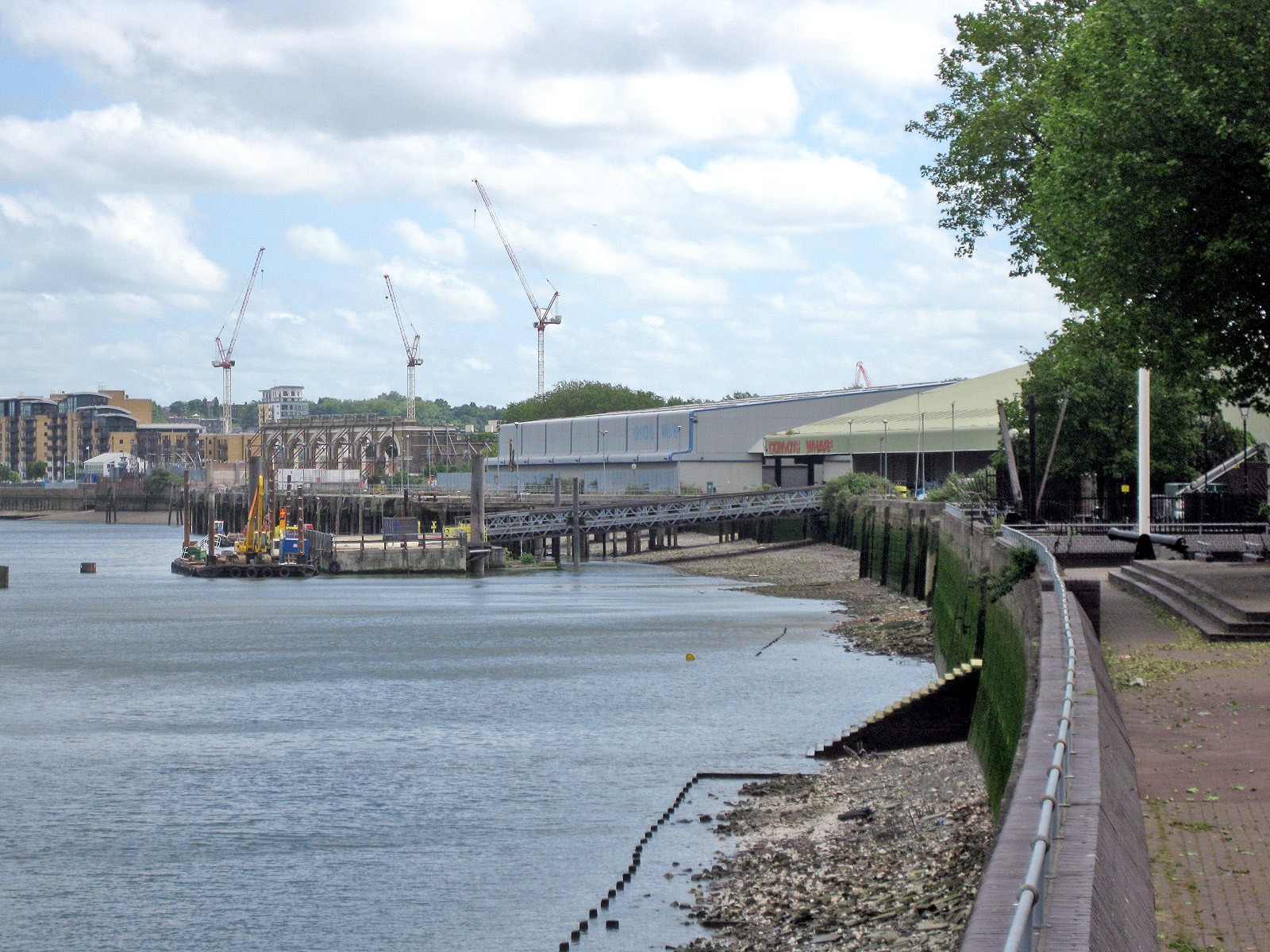
The Thames Path interrupted by Convoys Wharf

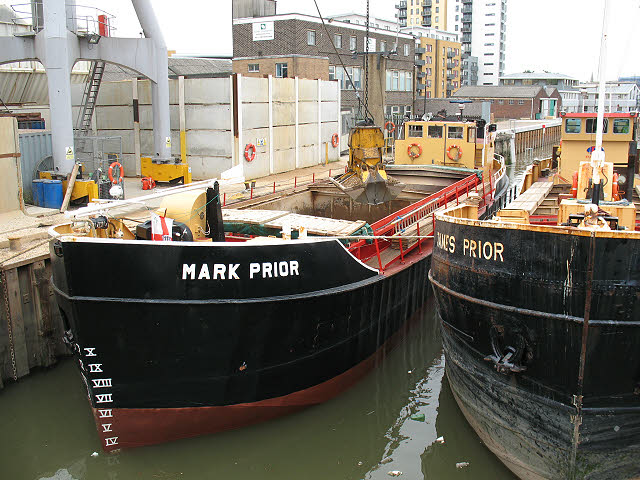
Ships unloading at Brewery Wharf, Deptford Creek in 2009

- Deadman's Dock, later Deadman's Wharf, later Deptford Wharf
- site of Royal Victoria Victualling Yard
- site of Deptford Supply Reserve Depot, part of the Deptford Dockyard later the Foreign Cattle Market, later Convoy's Wharf †
- Palmer's Wharf
- Watergate Stairs, site of Deptford Ferry
- site of Payne's Paper Wharf
- site of Borthwick's Cold Stores
- site of Deptford Power Station
- site of The Stowage, East India Company shipyard, later General Steam Navigation Co's Deptford Green Dockyard
- Deptford Creek
- Brewery Wharf (active aggregate wharf) †

=== Greenwich ===
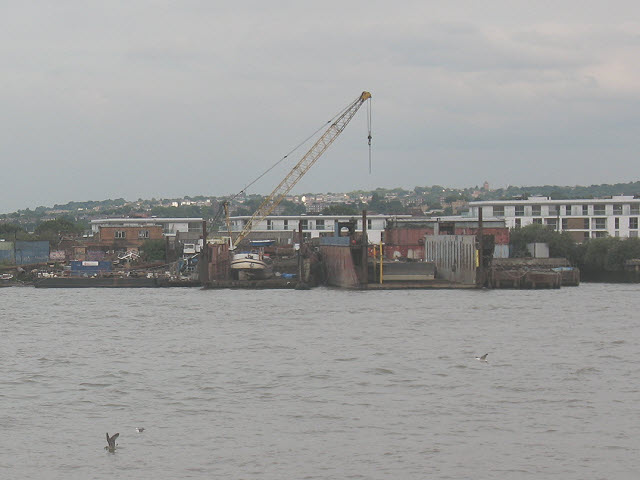
Thames Craft Dry Docking, boatyard at Badcock's Wharves, 2010

- Phoenix Wharf (Phoenix Gas Light & Coke Co), later Granophast Wharf
- Dreadnought Yard (originally J & G Rennie's shipyard)
- Victoria & Norway Wharf
- site of Greenwich Vehicular Ferry
- Talbot's Wharf
- Billingsgate Dock
- Dodd's Wharf

(Greenwich foot tunnel)

- Greenwich Pier (TfL river service)
- former Dreadnought Seamen's Hospital (now part of University of Greenwich)
- former Royal Naval College, now National Maritime Museum
- High Bridge Wharf
- Greenwich Power Station
- Crowley's Wharf
- Port of London Wharf
- Union Wharf
- Greenwich Wharf
- Lovell’s Wharf (status as a safeguarded wharf now lost)
- Granite Wharf (status as a safeguarded wharf now lost)
- Badcock's Wharves
- Piper's Wharf, Thames craft dry docking

=== Greenwich Peninsula ===
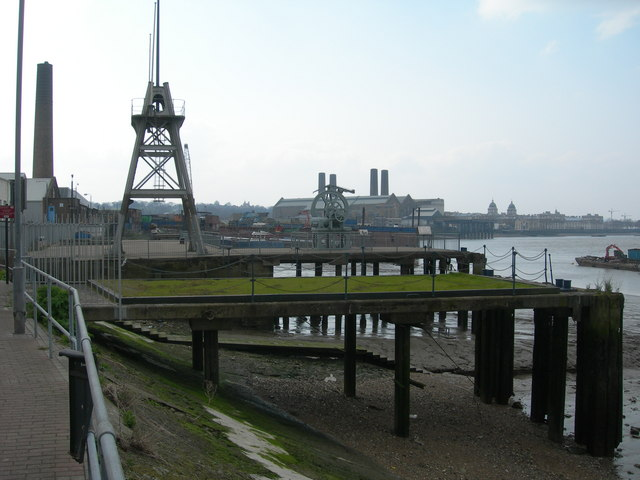
Cable loading gear preserved on Enderby's Wharf, 2007. In the distance is Greenwich Power Station.

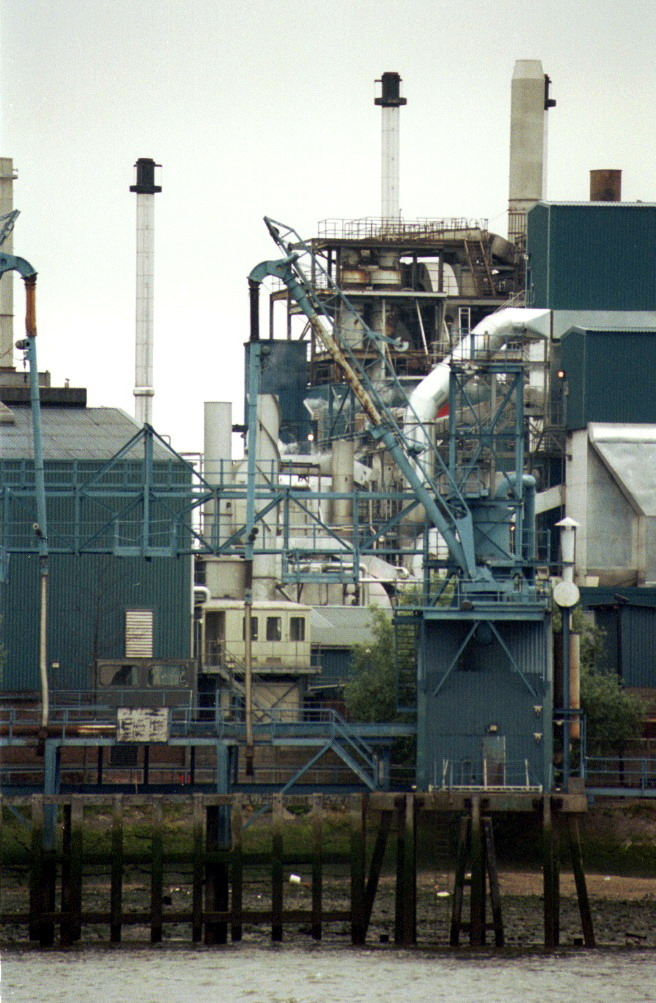
Tunnel Glucose on Greenwich Peninsula, 2000

- Enderby's Wharf (originally the rope works of a whaling company, subsequently a submarine cable works owned by a succession of firms from Glass Elliot (1857) including STC, currently Alcatel)
- Tunnel Glucose † (formerly Thames Soap and Candle Works)
- Morden Wharf
- Primrose Wharf
- Bay Wharf (site of Maudslay Son & Field shipyard)
- Victoria Deep Water Terminal (Hanson Aggregates; originally Bessemer's steel works; Victoria linoleum; container terminal until the 1990s) †
- Imperial Wharf
- Sussex Wharf
- Delta/Blackwall Wharf(originally Delta Metals brass, bronze etc. works) (major aggregates wharf now lost - redeveloped as part of the Greenwich Peninsula masterplan)
- Draw dock
- Ordnance Wharf (originally Blakely's Ordnance Works making heavy guns)

(Blackwall Tunnel)

- site of Blackwall Point dry dock
- Blackwall Point
- site of South Metropolitan Gas Co's East Greenwich Gas Works
- Queen Elizabeth II Pier (TfL river service) on site of gas works coaling jetty
- Phoenix Wharf
- site of Blackwall Point Power Station

=== New Charlton ===
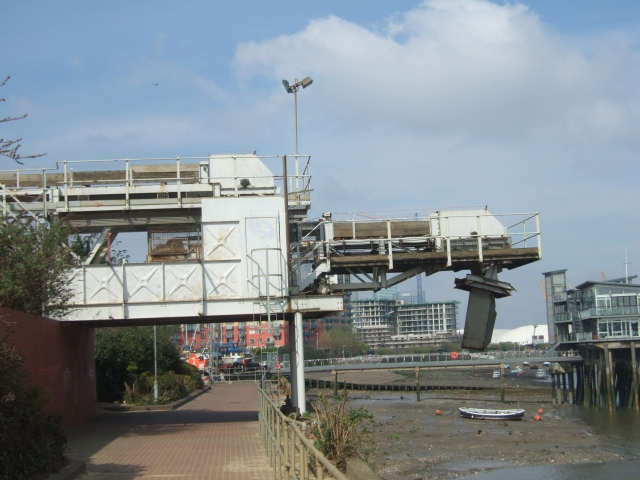
Aggregate conveyor, Angerstein Wharf

- Peartree Wharf
- Angerstein Wharf † (aggregates wharf with rail head)
- Murphy's Wharf (Tarmac, major existing aggregates terminal)†
- Cory's Barge Works
- Charlton Parish Wharf
- Durham Coal Wharf
- Charlton Wharf
- Charlton Ballast Wharf
- Riverside Wharf † (Tarmac)
- Telegraph Wharf
- Barrier Gardens Pier (Port of London Authority)
- Thames Barrier

=== Woolwich ===
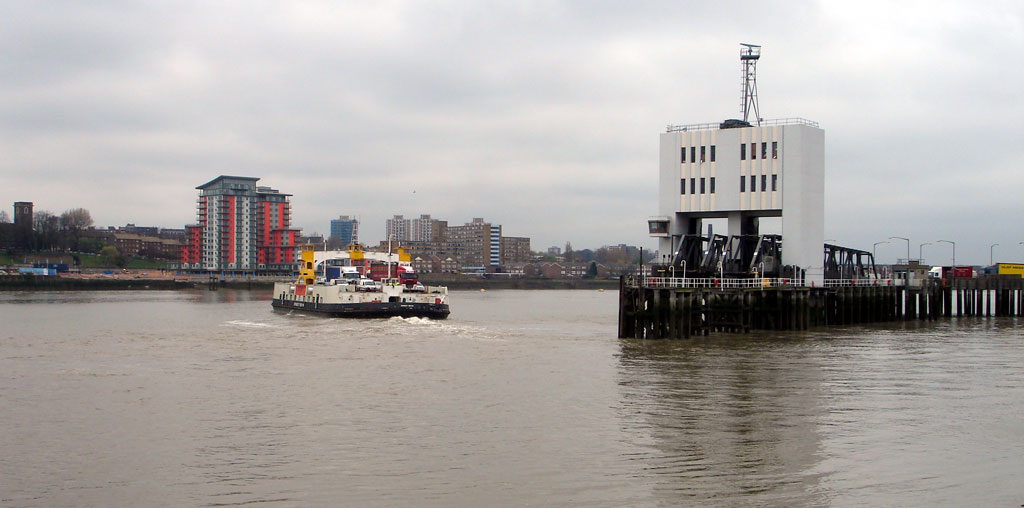
Woolwich Ferry, looking south west towards Woolwich

- Warspite Wharf (site of Siemens Brothers telegraph works)
- Long's Wharf
- Trinity Wharf
- site of Woolwich Dockyard
- Royal Dockyard Wharf
- Parish Wharf
- Woolwich Free Ferry southern landing stage
- site of Woolwich Power Station
- Woolwich Arsenal Pier (TfL river service)
- site of Woolwich Arsenal
- Margaret or Tripcock Ness
- Cross Ness
- Crown Wharf (off Globe Lane)

=== Belvedere, Erith and Crayford Ness ===
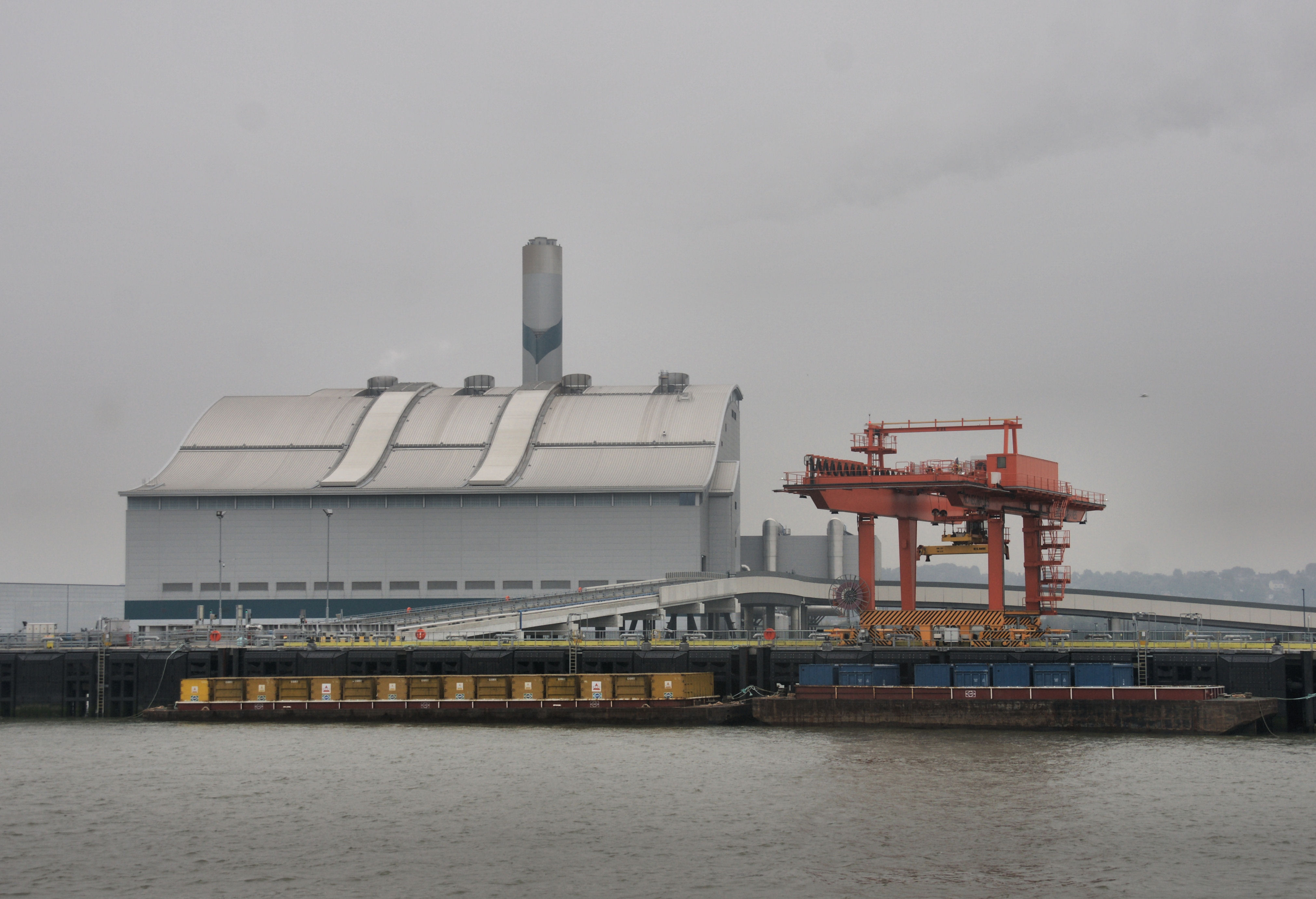
Belvedere Incinerator from the Thames. Refuse barges are moored on the quay.

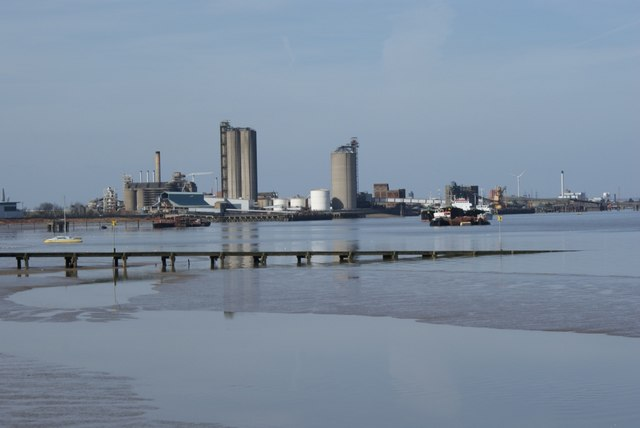
The Thames at Erith. Straight ahead is the ADM oil seed mill.

- Belvedere Incinerator
- site of Belvedere Power Station
- Borax Wharf/Manor Wharf †
- Mulberry Wharf †
- Jenningtree Point
- Pioneer Wharf †
- Albion Wharf † (includes numerous jetties and landing stages)
- RMC Erith (jetty and landing stages) †
- site of BICC cable works
- ADM Erith
- Ballast Wharf
- Chalk Farm Wharf
- Erith Pier (formerly in commercial use, now rebuilt for leisure)
- Garden Wharf
- Railway Wharf (RMC) †
- Standard Wharf †
- European Metal Recycling
- Crayford Ness

=== Dartford, Greenhithe and Swanscombe ===
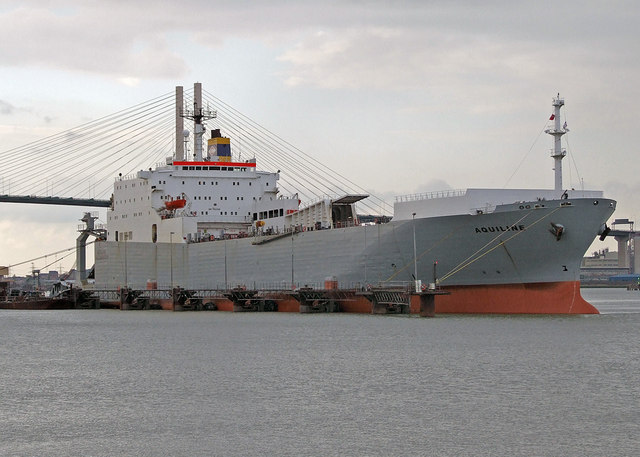
Container ship Aquiline berthed at Dartford International Freight Terminal

- River Darent
- Littlebrook Power Station

(Dartford Crossing)

- Thames Europort
- CdMR Dartford (ro-ro ferry terminal).
- Johnson's Wharf (aggregates)
- Globe Wharf
- Bell Wharf

=== Northfleet and Gravesend ===
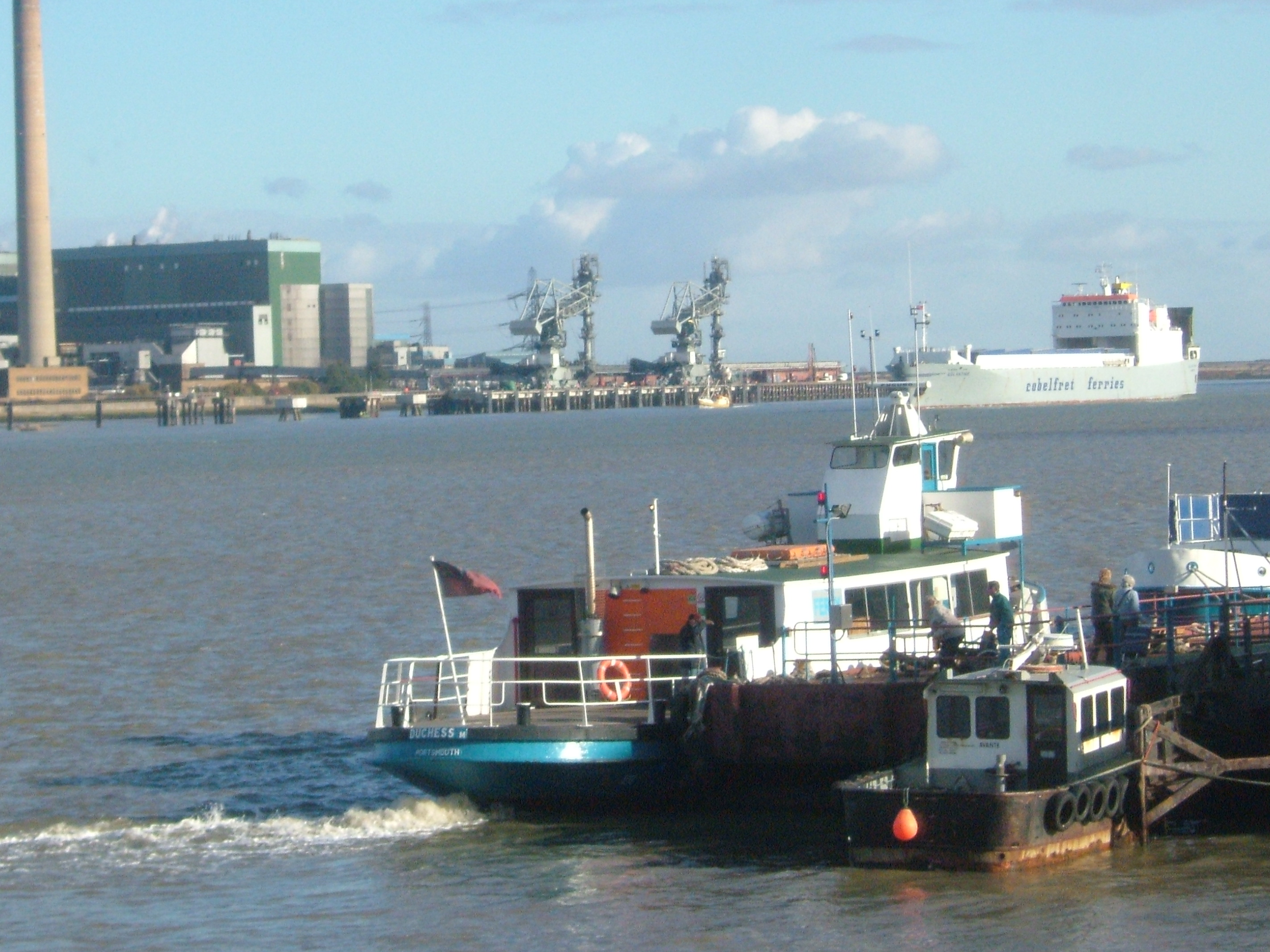
Shipping at Gravesend with Tilbury Power Station in the background. The large Cobelfret vessel is heading to Ford at Dagenham

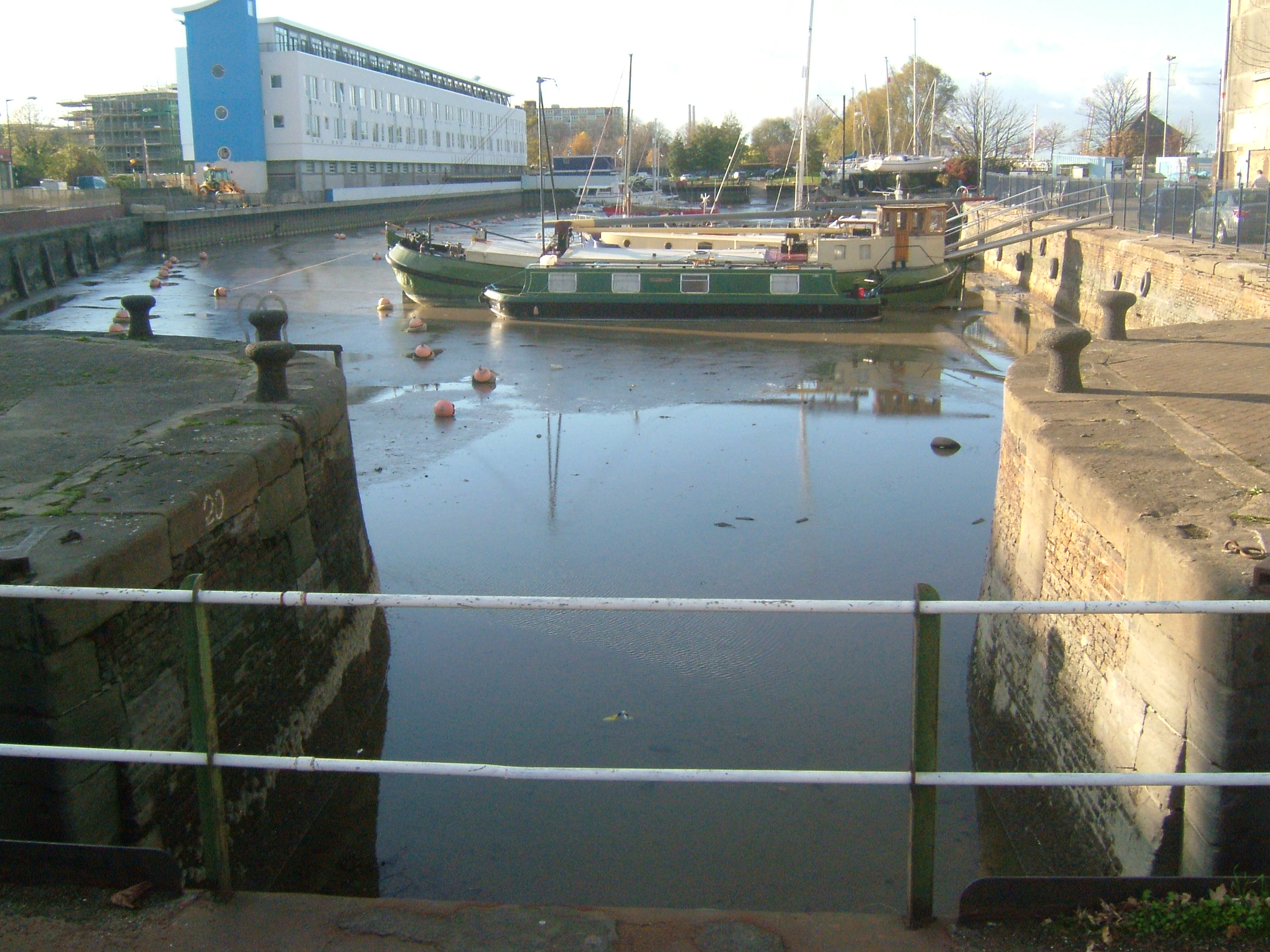
The Gravesend Canal Basin - the canal and locks are under restoration

- Broadness
- Northfleet Wharf
- Britannia Terminal
- Seacon Terminals Tower Wharf (steel, forest products)
- Robin's Wharf
- Brett Aggregates
- Bevan's Wharf
- Northfleet Terminal (Kimberly-Clark)
- Red Lion Wharf
- Bowater's Wharf
- Fletchers Wharf, Gravesend
- Baltic Wharf
- West Street Pier
- Commercial Wharf
- Town Wharf, Gravesend
- Gravesend–Tilbury Ferry landing stages
- Town Pier, Gravesend
- Royal Terrace Pier and landing stage, Gravesend (headquarters of the Port of London Authority)
- Custom House Pier, Gravesend
- Gravesend Canal Basin
- Denton Wharf and Jetty, Gravesend (owned by the Port of London Authority and main base for PLA vessels)
- Jetty (Metropolitan Police training centre)
- Clubb's Marine Terminal (sea-dredged aggregates)

=== Cliffe ===
- North Sea Terminal (sea-dredged aggregates)
- Lower Hope Point
- Yantlet Creek

Below here lie the Medway ports including Thamesport, a container port on the site of BP's Kent oil refinery on the Isle of Grain and Sheerness on the Isle of Sheppey. These are not part of the Port of London.

== North bank ==
=== Isleworth ===
- Lion Wharf
- Town Wharf
- Bridge Wharf

=== Brentford and Strand-on-the-Green ===
- Brentford Dock (formerly a major trans-shipment point between the river and the Great Western Railway)
- River Brent and Grand Union Canal entrance
- site of Thames Soap Works
- Point Wharf
- Goat Wharf

(Kew Bridge)

- Ball's Wharf
- Magnolia Wharf

(Kew Railway Bridge)

=== Chiswick ===
(Chiswick Bridge)
(Barnes Railway Bridge)

- Lep Wharf
- Chiswick Pier
- River Wharf
- Church Wharf, site of Thornycroft's first torpedo boat yard, later Cherry Blossom shoe polish
- Chiswick Wharf
- Fuller's Griffin Brewery
- Chiswick Draw Dock
- Durham Wharf
- St Peter's Wharf

=== Hammersmith ===
- Albert Wharf
- Atlanta Wharf
- Beckett's Wharf
- Hope Wharf

(Hammersmith Bridge)

- Queen's Wharf
- Gwynne's Wharf
- Chancellor's Wharf

=== Fulham and Sands End ===
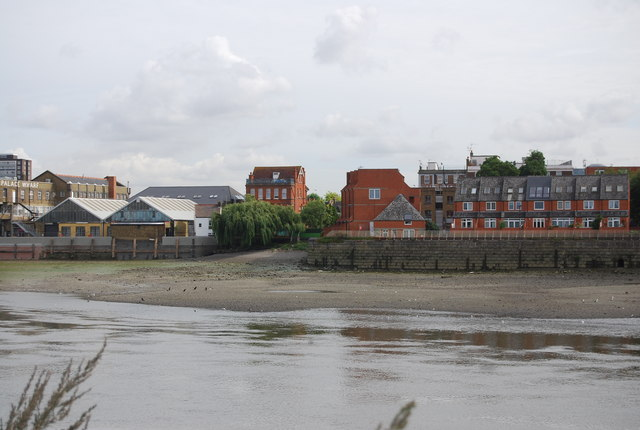
Palace Wharf (left), Crabtree Wharf and Crabtree Drawdock, 2010

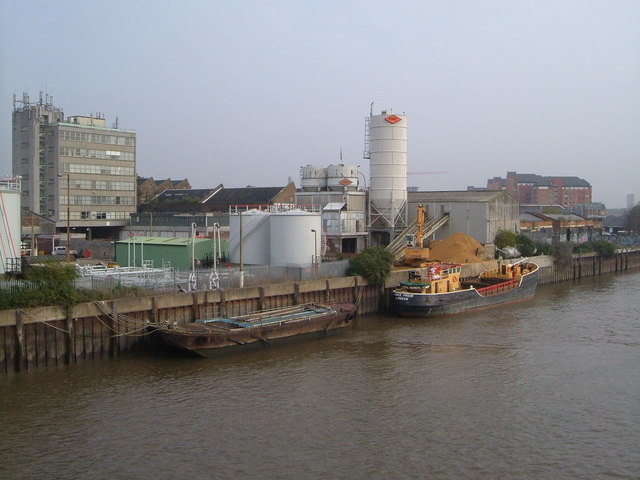
Swedish Wharf, Comley's Wharf and Fulham Wharf, Fulham, 2006

- Distillery Wharf (site of Haig distillery)
- site of Manbre's sugar works (later Manbre & Garton)
- Duckham's Wharf (formerly Duckham's Motor Oil works)
- Thames Wharf
- Dorset Wharf (formerly Anglo-American Oil Company)
- Tea Rose Jetty and Wharf
- Greyhound Wharf
- Palace Wharf
- Crabree Wharf
- Crabtree Draw Dock
- Wheatsheaf Wharf
- Rosebank Wharf
- Redline Wharf
- Blakes Wharves
- National Benzole Wharf
- Eternit Wharf
- Stevenage Wharf

(Putney Bridge)

- Swan Wharf
- Carrara Wharf
- Willowbank Wharf

(Fulham Railway Bridge)

- Broomhouse Draw Dock
- Petrofina Wharf
- Whiffin Wharf
- Hurlingham Wharf †
- Trinidad Wharf (former asphalt wharf)

(Wandsworth Bridge)

- Albert Wharf
- Swedish Wharf †
- Comley's Wharf (RMC Fulham) †
- Fulham Wharf
- site of Fulham Power Station
- Shell Wharf
- Lensbury Wharf
- site of Imperial Gas Works pier
- Nacovia Wharf

(Battersea Railway Bridge)

- Chelsea Harbour Pier (TfL river service)
- Chelsea Harbour marina (formerly Chelsea Basin)

=== Chelsea ===
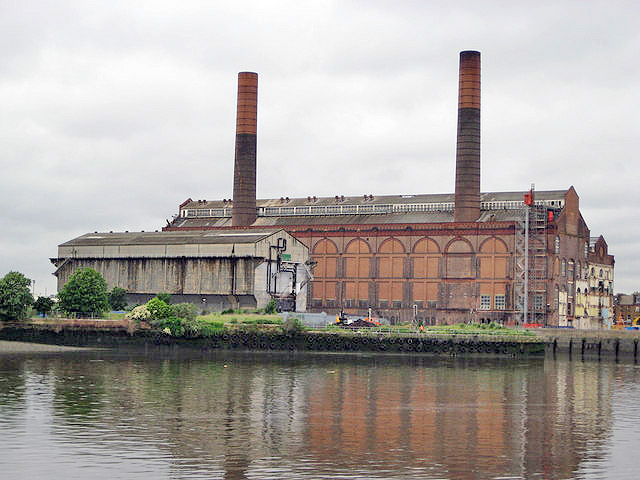
Lots Road Power Station, 2008

- Counter's Creek
- former Lots Road Power Station
- Cremorne Wharf †
- Chelsea Wharf
- Durham Wharf

(Albert Bridge)

- Cadogan Pier (TfL river service)

=== Westminster and City of London ===
(Chelsea Bridge)

- Grosvenor Canal

(Grosvenor Bridge)

- Dinorvic Wharf, now Westminster Boating Base
- St George's Wharf
- Somerset Wharf
- Chester Wharf
- Eagle Wharf

(Vauxhall Bridge)

- Baltic Wharf, site of Castle's Shipbreaking Company
- Millbank Millennium Pier (TfL river service)

(Lambeth Bridge)
(Westminster Bridge)

- Westminster Millennium Pier (TfL river service)
- PS Tattershall Castle
- RS Hispaniola

(Hungerford Bridge)

- Embankment Pier (TfL river service)
- Savoy Pier
- TS Queen Mary

(Waterloo Bridge)

- Temple Pier
- The Yacht (formerly PLA yacht St Katherine)
- HMS President
- Blackfriars Millennium Pier (TfL river service)

(Blackfriars Bridge)
(Blackfriars Railway Bridge)

- Puddle Dock
- Wheatsheaf Wharf
- England Wharf
- Crown Wharf
- Horseshoe Wharf
- Anchor Wharf
- Castle Baynard Dock
- Lion Wharf
- Paul's Wharf

(Millennium Bridge)

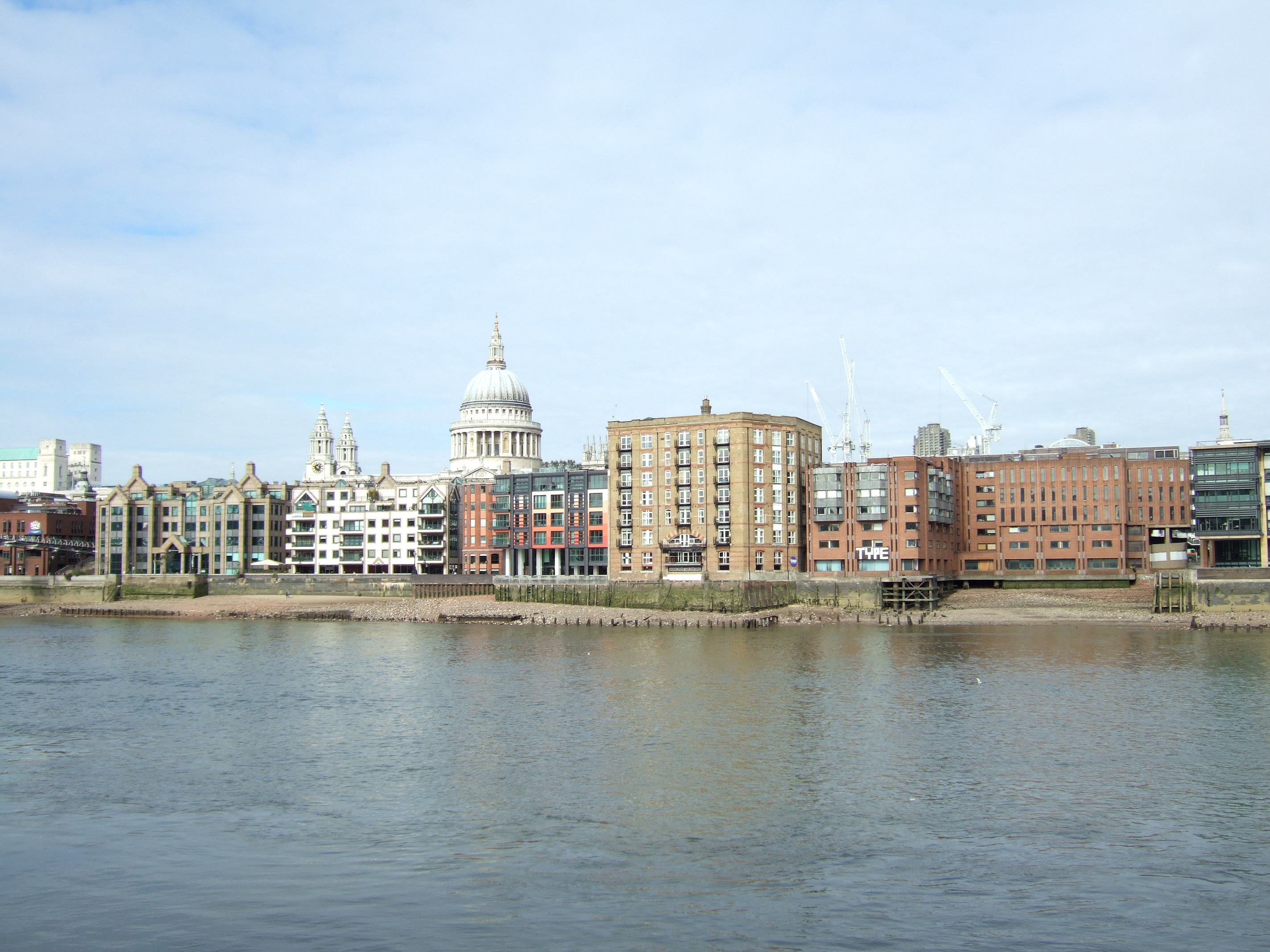
The Queenhithe riverside (upstream to the left; Queenhithe dock on right) from Bankside

- Trig Wharf
- Broken Wharf
- Brook's Wharf
- Stew Lane Stairs
- Maidstone Wharf
- Queenhithe Dock
- Queenhithe Stairs
- Kennet Wharf
- Southwark Bridge Stairs

(Southwark Bridge)

- Bell Wharf
- Dowgate Dock
- Kennet Wharf
- Walbrook Wharf (waste transfer station) †
- Cousin Lane Stairs

(Cannon Street Railway Bridge)

- Allhallows Lane Stairs leading to Allhallows Pier
- Red Bull Wharf
- Dyers' Hall Wharf
- Commercial Wharf
- Old Swan Stairs leading to Old Swan Pier/Dolphin Pontoon
- Old Swan Wharf
- City Pier and Fishmongers Hall Wharf

=== Upper Pool ===
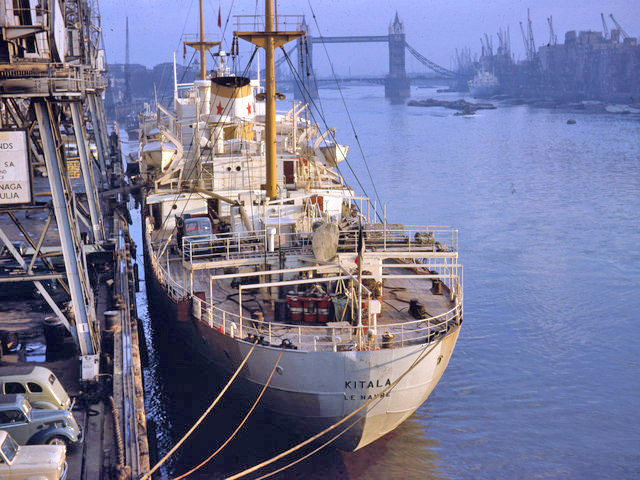
A ship berths at London Bridge Wharf in the busy Upper Pool in 1962

(London Bridge)

- London Bridge Wharf
- (Site of Old London Bridge)
- Fresh Wharf
- Cox and Hammond's Wharf
- Botolph Wharf
- Nicholson's Wharf
- Somers Quay Stairs
- Grant's Quay Wharf
- Billingsgate Market
- Custom House Stairs West
- Custom House Wharf
- Custom House Stairs East
- Custom House and Wool Quays
- Galley Dock and Quay
- Chester Quay
- Brewer's Quay
- Tower Dock
- Tower Stairs
- Tower Millennium Pier (TfL river service)

(Tower Bridge)

=== Wapping and Shadwell ===
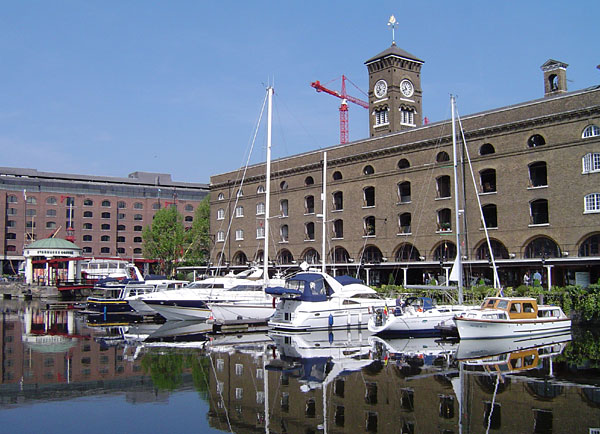
St Katharine Docks in 2004

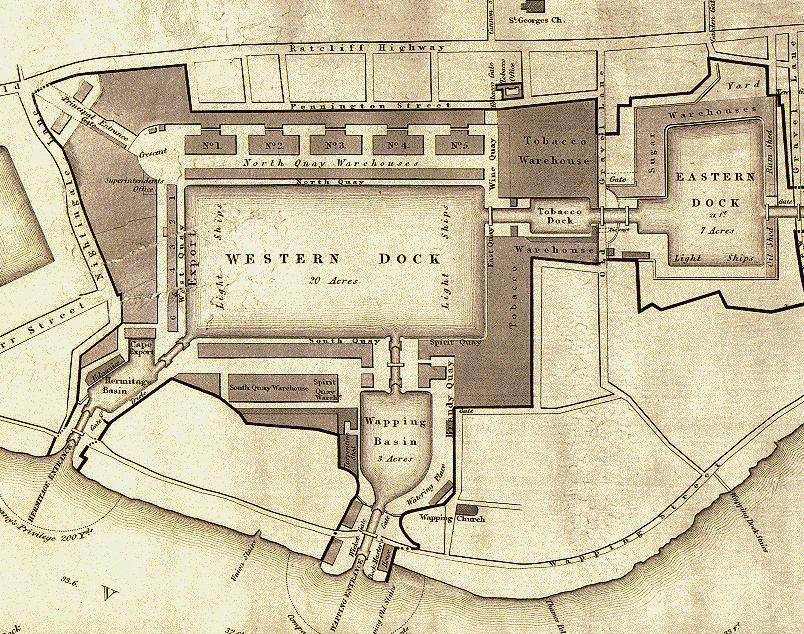
London Docks in 1831

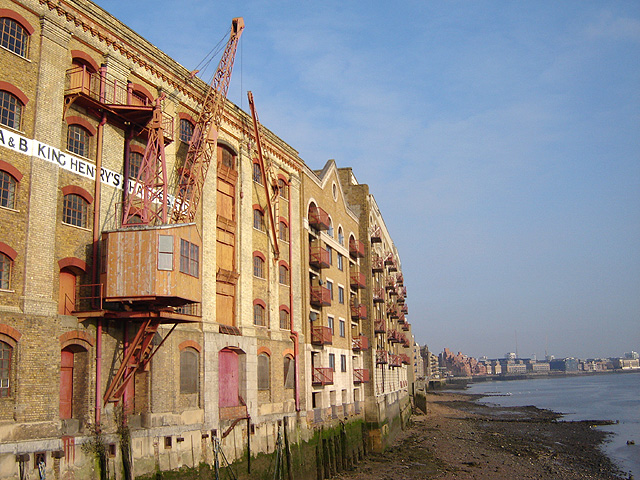
King Henry's Wharves, 2006

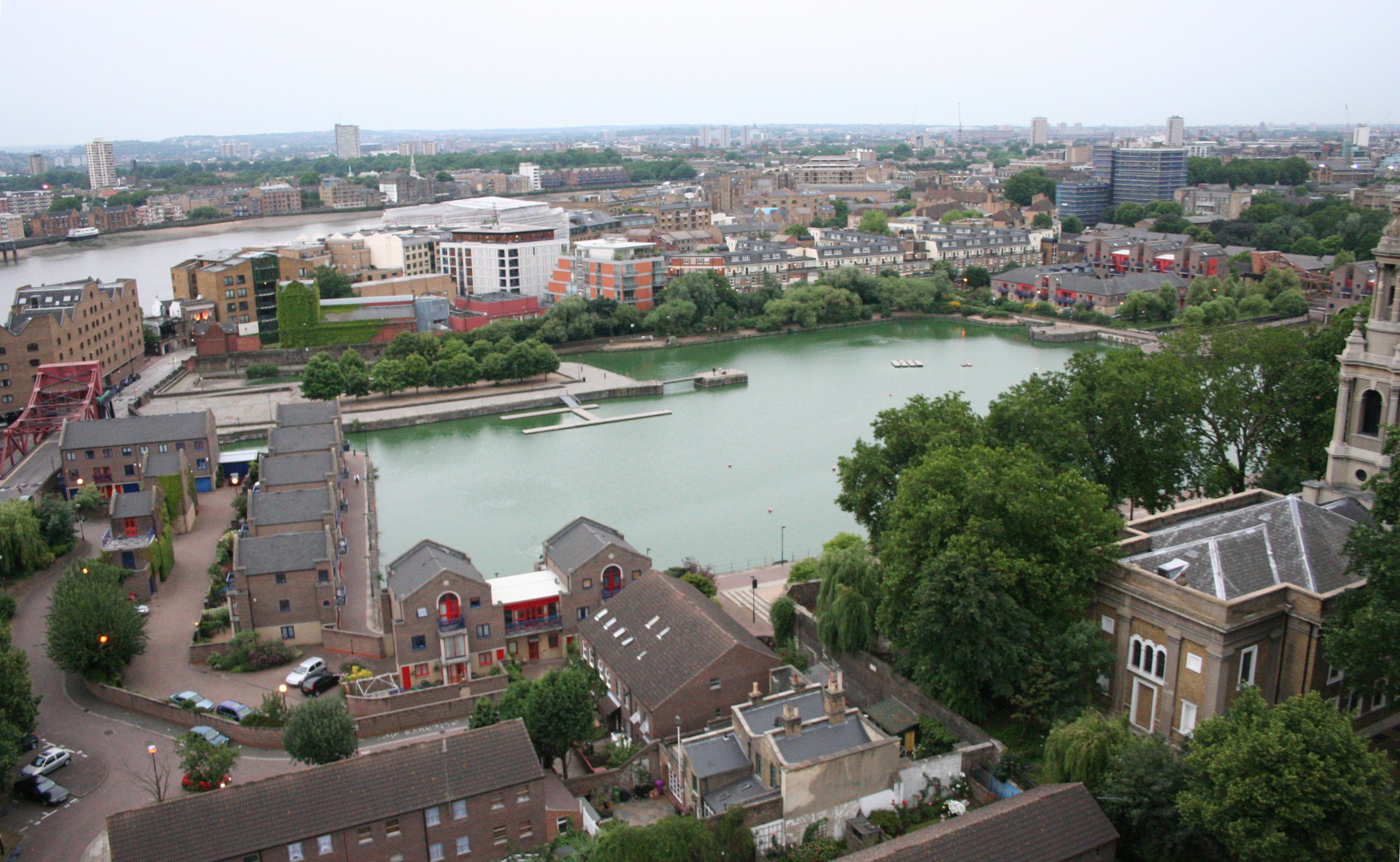
Shadwell Basin in 2007

- Irongate Wharf
- St Katharine Wharf
- St Katharine Docks
- Tower Bridge Quay (TfL river service)
- Harrison's Wharf
- South Devon Wharf
- British and Foreign Wharves
- HMS President, a stone frigate
- Miller's Wharf
- Carron Wharf
- London and Continental Steam Wharf

(Hermitage entrance to London Docks)

- Hermitage Steam Wharf
- Colonial Wharves
- Standard Wharves
- Watson's Wharf
- Black Eagle Wharf
- Brewers Wharf
- Albion Wharf
- Hasties Wharf
- St Helens Wharf

(Wapping entrance to London Docks)

- Oliver's Wharf
- Orient Wharf
- Gun Wharf
- St John's Wharf
- Morocco Wharf
- Eagle Sufferance Wharf
- Eagle Wharf
- Baltic Wharf
- Old Aberdeen Wharf
- Wapping Police Station
- St John's Wharf
- Sun Wharf
- Swan Wharf
- Tunnel Pier
- King Henry's Wharves
- Gibb's Wharf
- Gun Wharves
- Middleton and St Bride's Wharf
- Foundry Wharf
- St Hilda's Wharf
- New Crane Wharves
- Lower Oliver's Wharf
- Lushes Wharf
- Metropolitan Wharf
- Thorpe's and Queen Wharf
- Pelican Wharf

(Shadwell New Entrance to Shadwell Basin and London Docks)

=== Limehouse ===
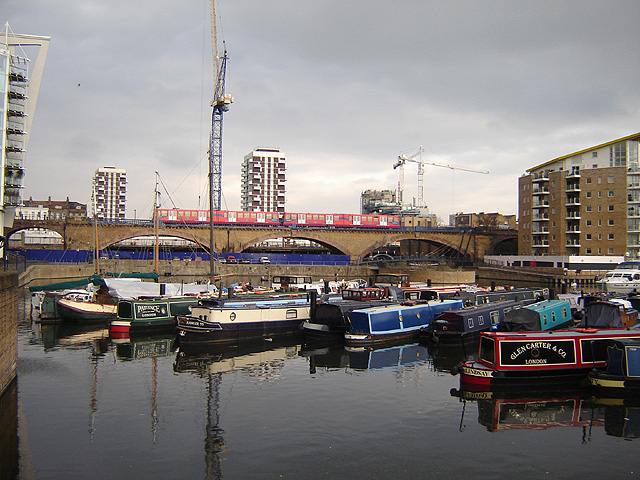
Limehouse Basin looking north.

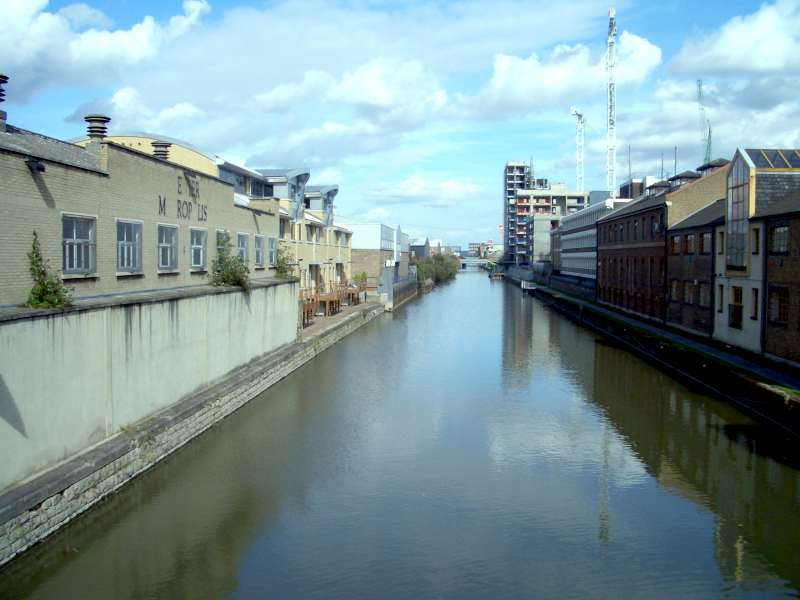
Looking north east along the Limehouse Cut.

- Sea-borne Coal Wharf
- Bowle's Wharf
- Free Trade Wharf
- Hubbuck's Wharf
- Ratcliff Cross Wharf
- Lendrum's Wharf
- Phoenix Wharf
- Trinity Ballast Wharf
- Marriage's Wharf
- Roneo Wharf
- London Wharf
- Crown Mill Wharf
- Eagle Wharf
- New Sun Wharf
- Vanes Wharf
- Oporto Wharf
- Old Sun Wharf
- Chinnock's Wharf
- entrance to Limehouse Basin (formerly Regent's Canal Dock)
- Victoria Wharf
- (former entrance to Limehouse Cut)
- Hough's Wharf
- Dover Wharf
- Blyth Wharf, site of Stepney Power Station
- Broadway Wharf
- Etheridge's Wharf
- Fielder's Wharf
- Lamb's Wharf
- Sparks' Wharf
- Moline Wharf
- Duke Shore Wharf
- Anchor Wharf
- Dunbar Wharf
- Limekiln Dock
- Dundee Wharf
- River Plate Wharf
- Limehouse Pier
- Buchanan's Wharf
- Aberdeen Wharf

=== Millwall ===
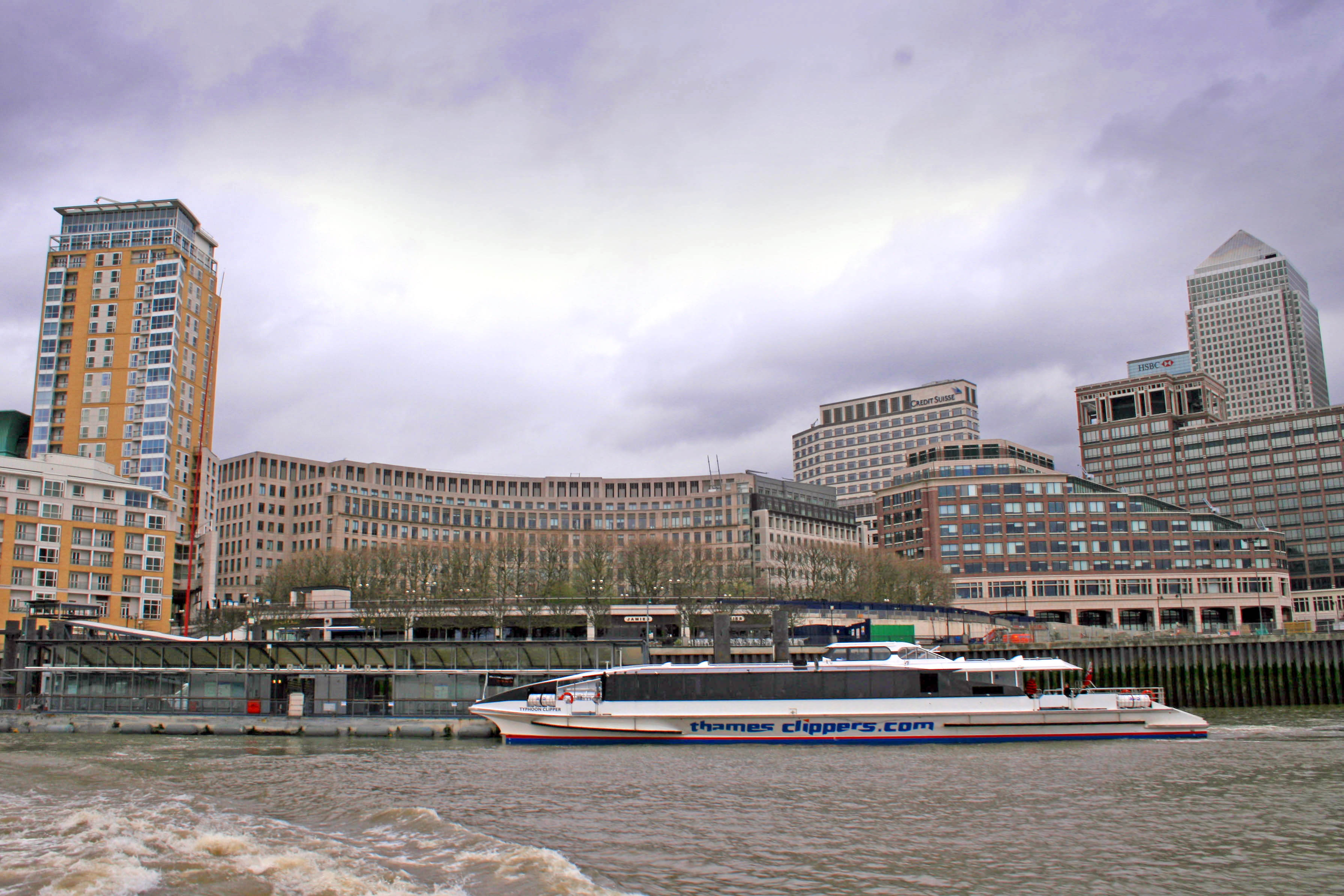
A Thames Clipper catamaran calls at Canary Wharf Pier

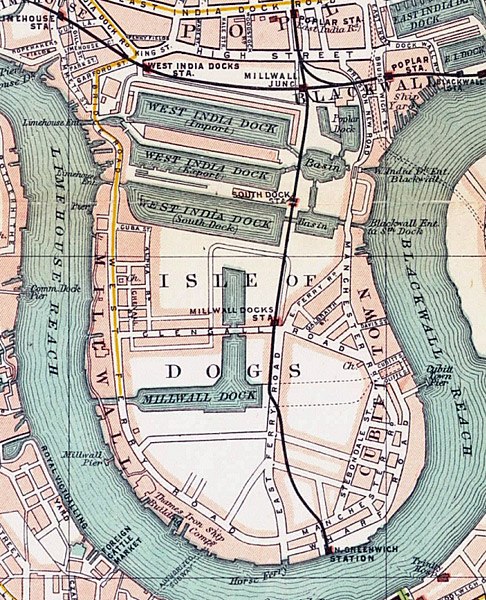
West India and Millwall Docks, 1899. East India Docks and Blackwall Yard top right.

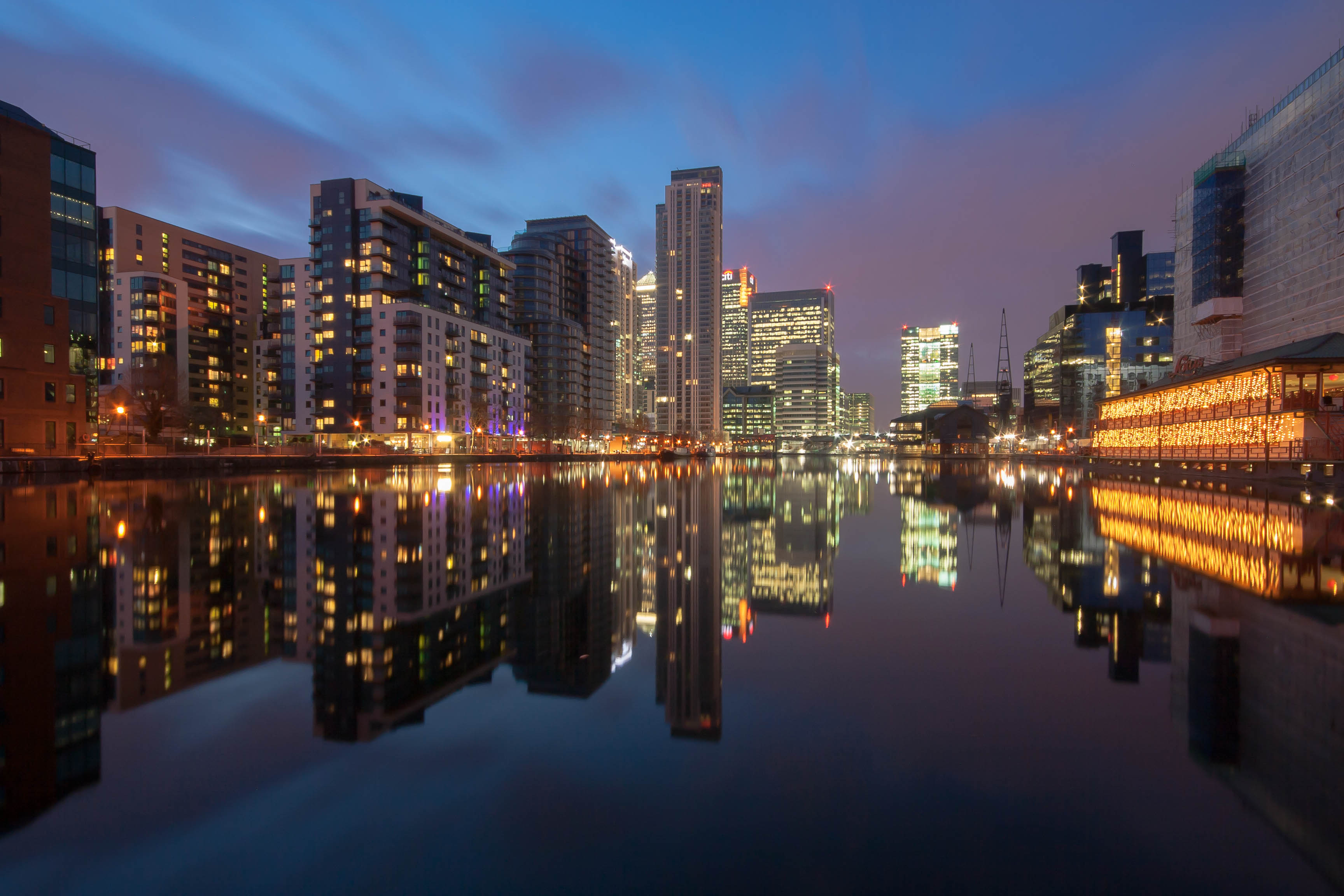
Millwall Inner Dock facing towards Canary Wharf

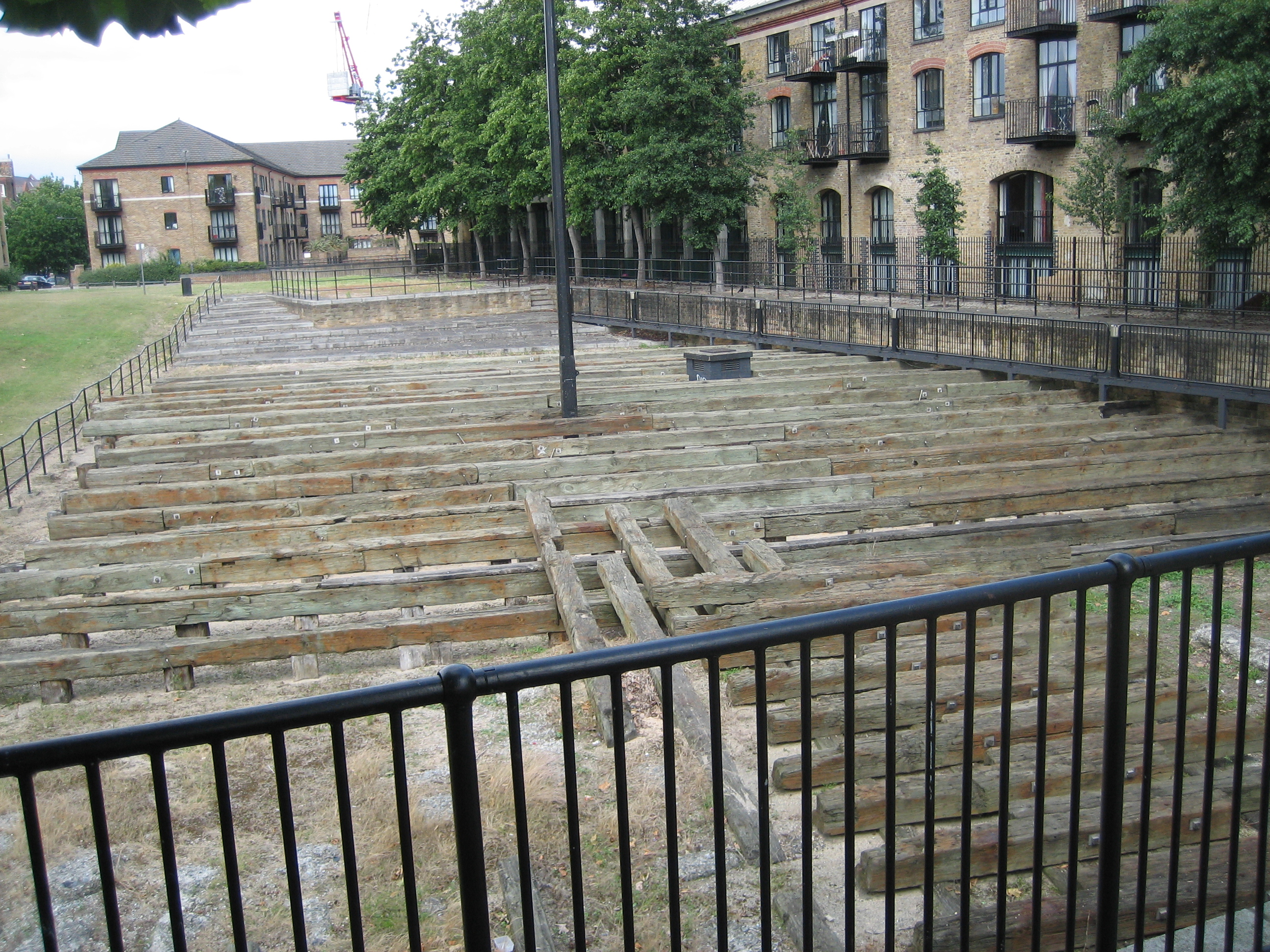
The SS Great Eastern's launch ramp at Millwall.

- Mallinson's Wharf
- Bridge Wharf (site of original West India Docks Limehouse Upper Entrance)
- Charrington Barge Yard
- Locke's Wharf
- Union Docks, later Union Docks Wharf
- Canary Wharf Pier (TfL river service)

(site of original West India Docks Limehouse Lower Entrance)

- Morton's Sufferance Wharf
- West India Dock Pier
- Batson's & Regents Wharves
- Regent Dry Dock
- Oak Wharf
- London Wharf
- Bullivant Wharf later Express Wharf (Seacon London Steel Terminal, moved to Northfleet late 1990s)
- Hutching's Wharf
- Ocean Wharf
- Lion Wharf
- Lollar Wharf
- Glengall Wharf
- site of Atlas Chemical Company, later Atlas Wharf
- Timothy's Wharf
- Mellish Wharf later Arnhem Wharf
- Fenner's Wharf later Klein's Wharf

(site of original Millwall Dock entrance)

- Phoenix Wharf
- Snowdon's Wharf
- Winkley's Wharf
- Cyclops Wharf (site of Le Bas Tube Co works)
- site of Millwall Pier
- Victoria Wharf (site of Crosse & Blackwell, later Le Bas Tube Co works)
- Anchor Wharf (site of Brown, Lenox & Co chain and anchor works)
- Cutler's Wharf (site of Providence Iron Works, makers of boilers, gas holders etc.)
- Masthouse Terrace Pier
- site of Drunken Dock, later Ferguson's Wharf, Rose's Wharf and St Andrew's Wharf
- site of Tindall's Dry Dock, later Britannia Dock
- Guelph Wharf
- site of Napier Yard and Millwall Iron Works
- Venesta Wharf
- Burrell's Wharf (site of Burrell's & Co's paint works)
- Maconochie's Wharf
- Nelson Wharf
- Clyde Wharf, later Langbourn Wharf, later Shaw's Wharf
- site of Millwall Lead Works, later Locke's Wharf
- St David's Wharf (site of Manganese, Bronze & Brass Co, propeller makers)
- site of Antimony Works, later Owen Parry's Wharf
- site of Greenwich Vehicular Ferry,
- Port of London Wharf, later Felstead Wharf
- Victoria Wharf, later Millwall Boiler Works
- Livingston Wharf
- Midland Oil Wharf
- Johnson's Draw Dock
- Calder's Wharf

(Greenwich Foot Tunnel)

=== Cubitt Town ===
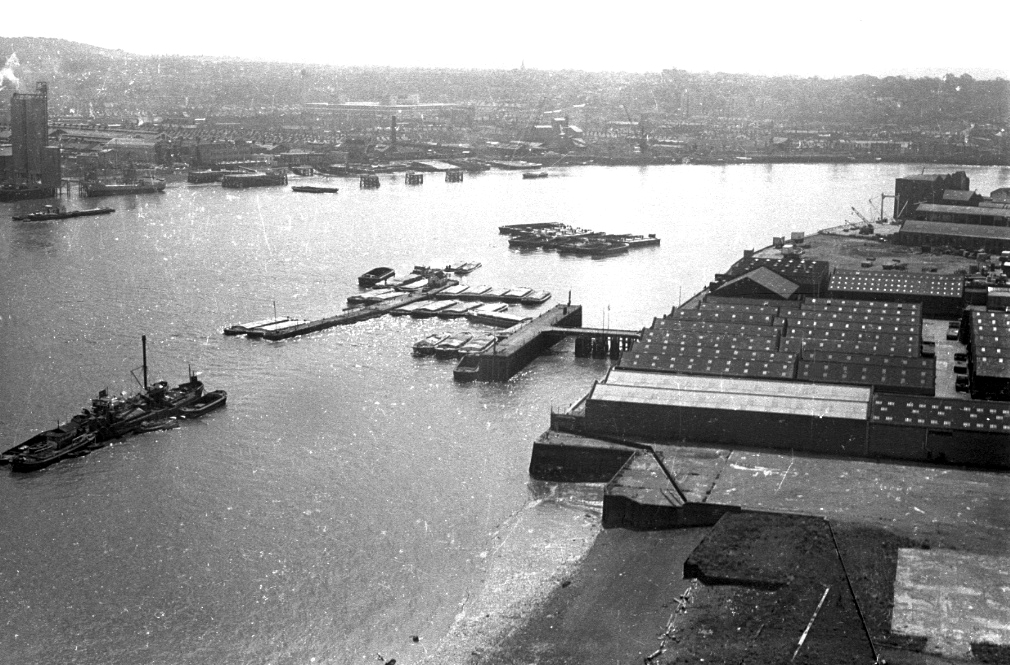
Millwall Wharf and Cubitt Town Wharf in 1974; the vacant site below is London Yard. Across the river are the silos of Tunnel Refineries, and Enderby's Wharf.

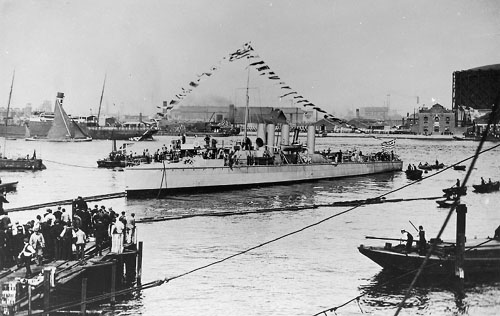
The Greek destroyer Thyella after launch at Yarrow's, 1906

- Honduras Wharf, later Lukach Wharf then Luralda Wharf
- Invicta Wharf
- Cumberland Mills
- Newcastle Draw Dock
- Grosvenor Wharf
- Alpha Wharf
- Poplar Dry Dock later Empire Wharf
- Storer's Wharf
- Caledonian Wharf
- Falcon Wharf
- Cubitt Town Wharf
- Plymouth Wharf
- Pyrimont Wharf
- Dudgeon's Wharf (formerly shipbuilding yard of J & W Dudgeon)
- Plough Wharf, later part of Millwall Wharf
- London Yard (Westwood, Baillie & Co shipyard; Yarrows; Morton's jam factory)
- former site of Samuda Brothers shipyard
- Elmer's Wharf
- New Union Wharf
- site of Blackwall Iron Works later Ovex Wharf
- Slipway Wharf
- Canal Dockyard
- entrance to West India Docks

=== Blackwall and Leamouth ===
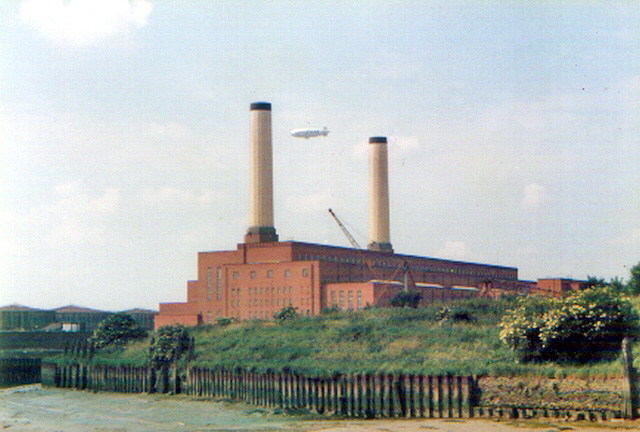
Brunswick Wharf power station, 1984

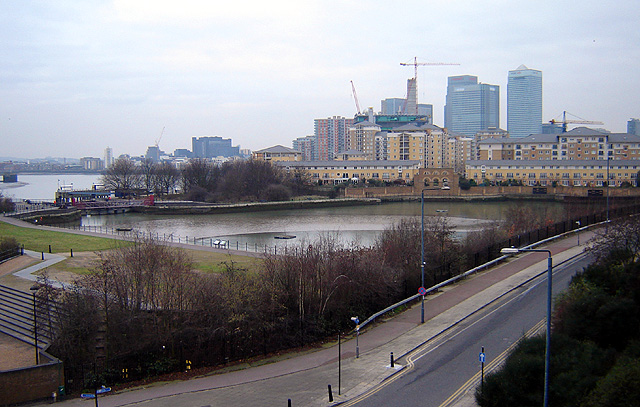
East India Dock entrance basin, 2006

- Concordia Wharf
- North Wharf
- entrance to Poplar Dock and West India Docks via Blackwall Basin
- Northumberland Wharf † (now a waste transfer station)
- Blackwall Stairs
- Ashton Wharf
- site of Blackwall Yard (part later Midland Railway's Poplar Dock)
- Brunswick Wharf
- site of Brunswick Wharf Power Station
- entrance to East India Docks
- East India Dock Wharf
- Orchard Wharf †
- Trinity Buoy Wharf

( Bow Creek)

=== Canning Town ===
- Eastern site of Thames Ironworks and Shipbuilding Company
- Priors Wharf (Lower Lea Valley/Bow Creek) †
- Mayer Parry Wharf (EMR Canning Town) (Lower Lea Valley/Bow Creek) †
- Phoenix Wharf
- Thames Wharf †

(site of original upper entrance to Royal Victoria Dock)

=== Silvertown ===
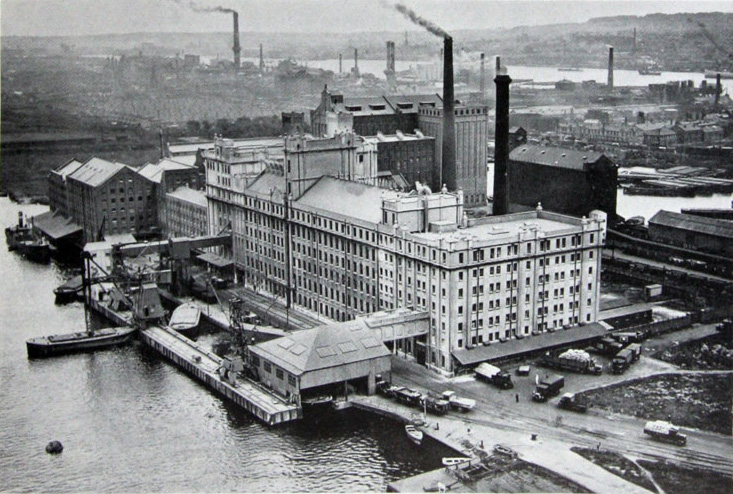
Spiller's Millennium Mills, Victoria Dock, 1934. Behind is the Graving Dock

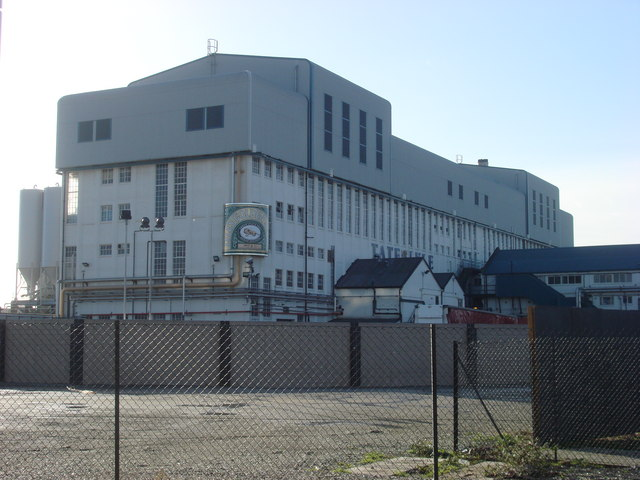
Tate & Lyle syrup refinery, Plaistow Wharf, 2009

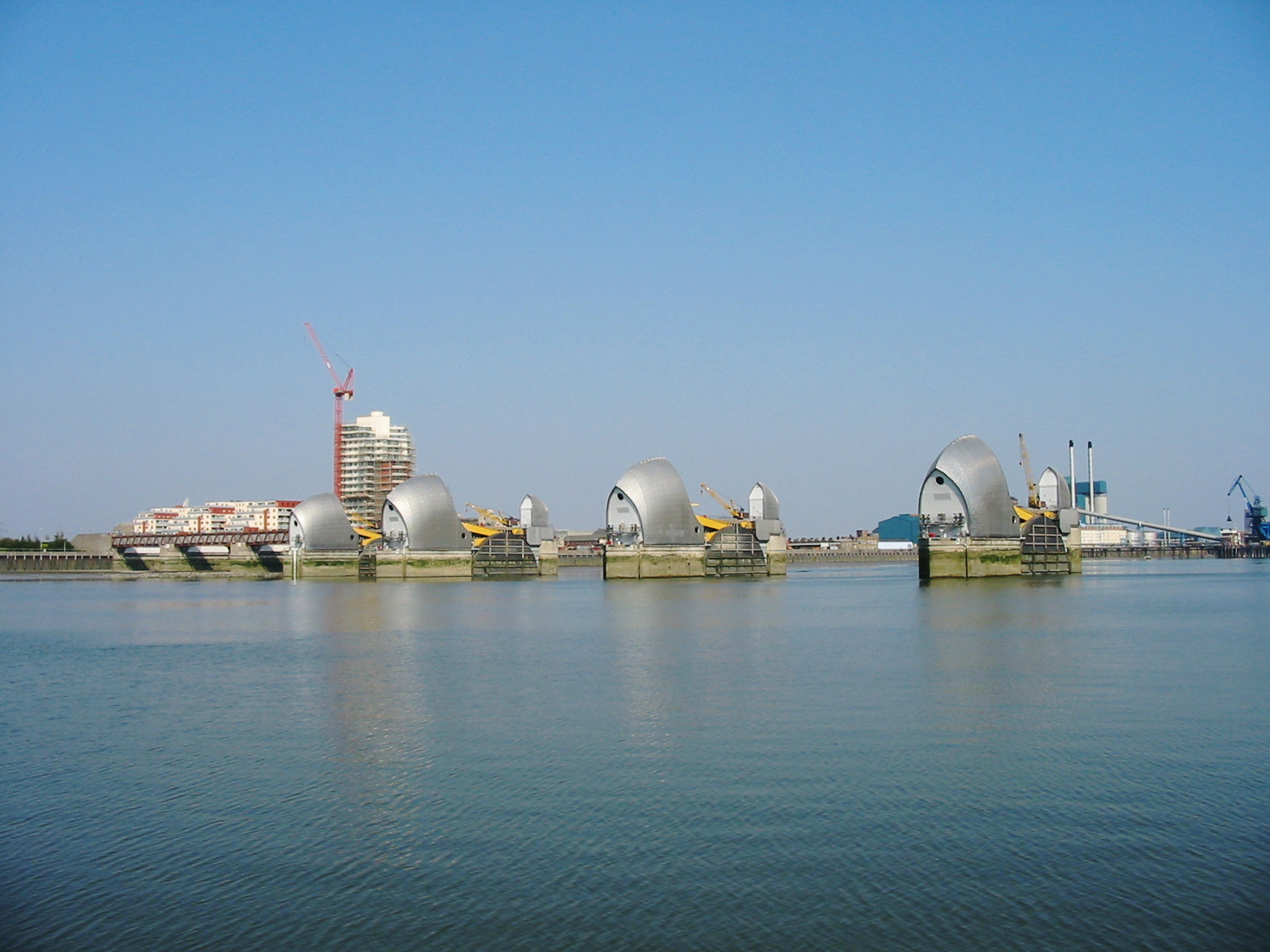
The Thames Flood Barrier in 2005

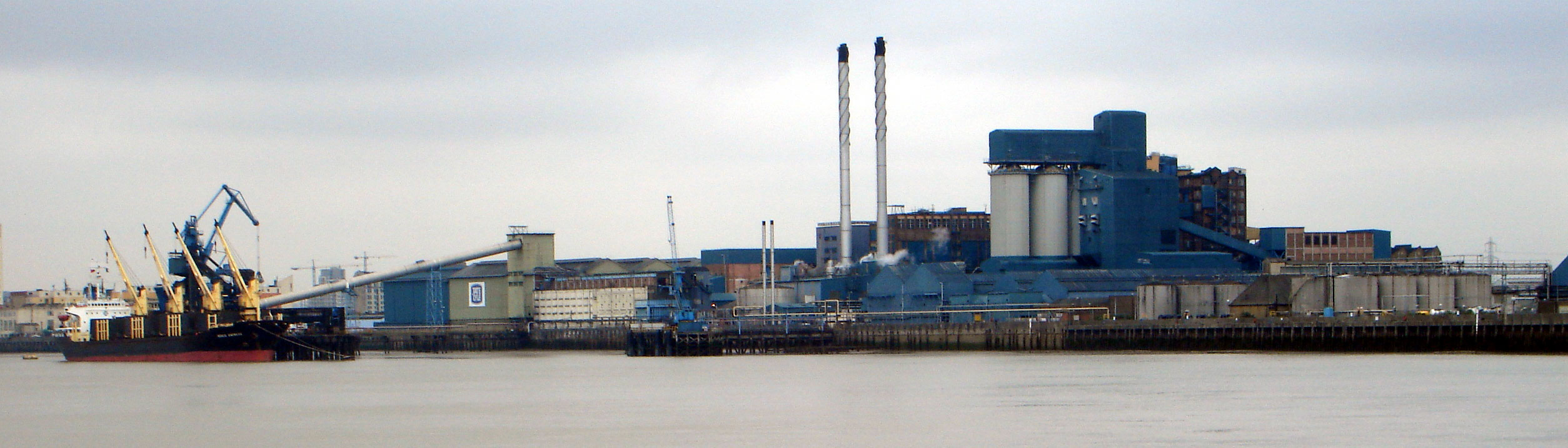
Tate & Lyle refinery, Silvertown, in 2006

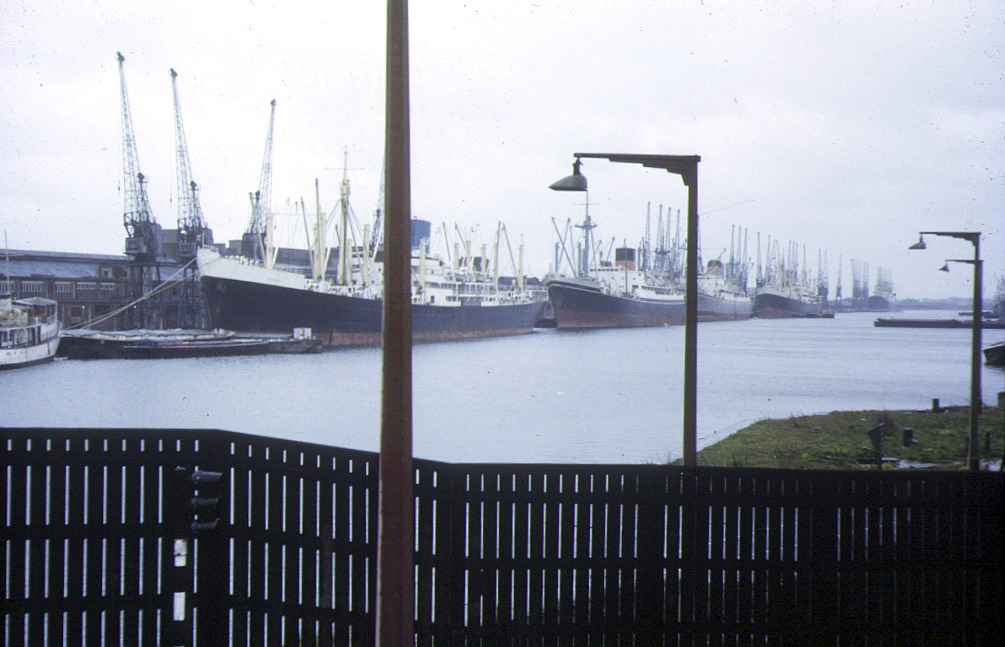
Royal Albert Dock, 1973

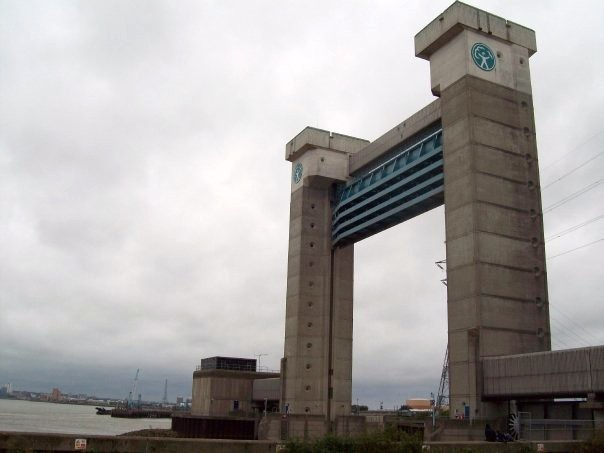
The Barking Creek tidal barrier

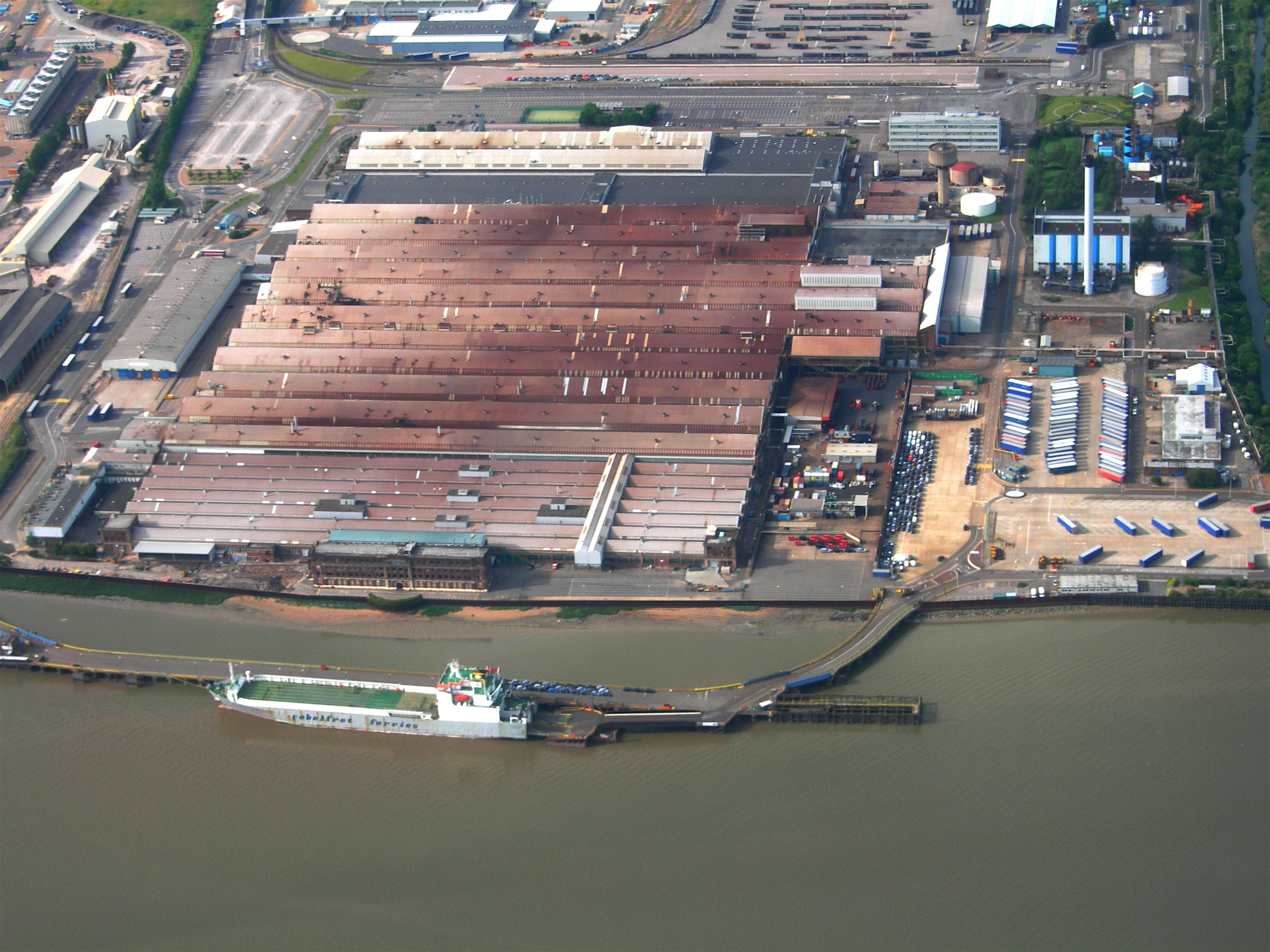
A Cobelfret Ferry at Ford's Dagenham terminal in 2006

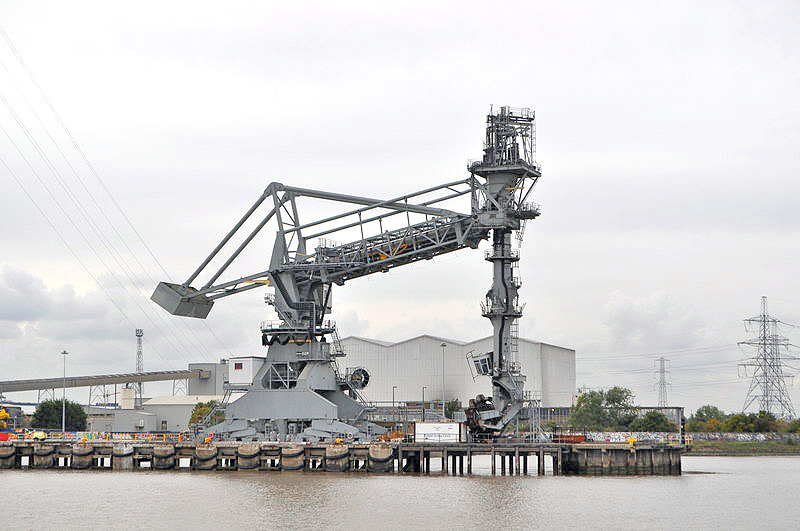
Bulk unloading equipment at West Thurrock Jetty, 2010

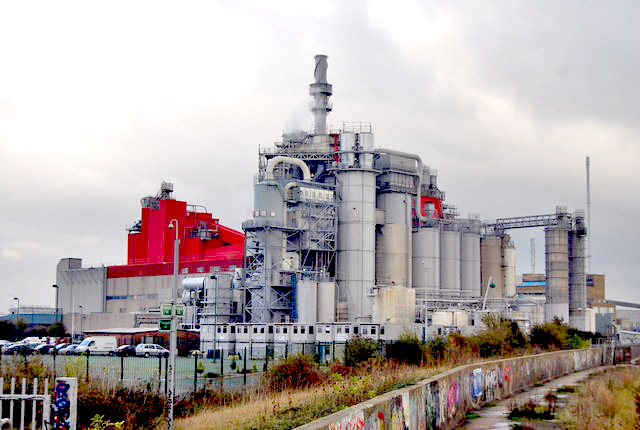
Procter & Gamble soap works, West Thurrock, 2009

- Odam's Wharf (originally chemical manure works, later Fisons)
- Clyde Wharf (originally Duncan, Bell & Scott sugar refinery, later United Alkali Company)
- Hall's Wharf
- Alexandra Wharf (formerly Carlsberg)
- Pinchin's Wharf (formerly Nuplex resins (originally Pinchin Johnson & Associates paints, later AkzoNobel))
- Peruvian Wharf (originally Peruvian Guano Wharf) †
- Plaistow Wharf; Tate & Lyle Golden Syrup works (now supplied from main site)
- Royal Primrose Wharf, site of Royal Primrose soap works
- Manhattan Wharf †
- Mohawk Wharf
- Lyle Park
- Venesta Wharf (no longer usable) (formerly Venesta plywood factory, later Aluminium Foils Ltd)
- Deanston Wharf
- Sunshine Wharf †
- Crescent Wharf (formerly Brunner Mond, site of Silvertown explosion, later ICI), now Royal Wharf
- Minoco Wharf (Minoco, later Gulf Lubricants), now Royal Wharf
- Prince Regent's Wharf (originally Burt, Boulton & Haywood chemical works), now Thames Barrier Park
- Thames Barrier northern end
- Ward's Wharf
- Thames Road Industrial Estate
- Tay Wharf (formerly Keiller's marmalade factory, later Crosse & Blackwell)
- site of Silver's India Rubber, Gutta Percha & Telegraph Co works (later BTR Industries), now Thameside Industrial Estate
- Tate & Lyle Thames Refinery and jetty
- Cairn Mills (formerly Loders & Nucoline, later Loders Croklaan oil seed works)

=== North Woolwich ===
- site of Western Electric Co's cable works (later STC)
- site of W.T. Henley's submarine cable works (later AEI)
- Woolwich Free Ferry north pier
- Woolwich foot tunnel
- Hoba Wharf
- Gallions Point
- site of Harland & Wolff ship repairers
- entrance to Royal Docks (remains in use for boat exhibitioning)
- site of filled South Entrance to basin of Royal Albert Dock
- North Entrance to basin of Royal Albert Dock, now used for Gallions Point Marina

=== Beckton ===
- Gallions Jetty (formerly Cory & Son)
- New Beckton Wharf (formerly BP)
- site of Beckton Gas Works and coaling piers
- Beckton Reach Sewerage Works Pier

=== Barking Creek ===
The following wharves are located on the lower section of the River Roding, at Creekmouth.

- Welbeck Wharf †
- Pinns Wharf †
- Kierbeck & Steel Wharves †
- Debden Wharf (recently improved) †
- Rippleway Wharf †
- Alexander Wharf (no longer usable)
- Maple Wharf (in use?)
- Bowen Wharf (backland built over; not usable)
- New Free Trade Wharf (backland built over; not usable)
- Dockland Construction Wharf (has been redeveloped into industrial units)
- Docklands Wharf †
- Victoria Stone Wharf †

=== Creekmouth ===
- Lawes Wharf
- DePass Wharf †
- Barking or False Point
- original site of Barking Power Station
- Barking Riverside Recycling Plant

=== Dagenham Dock ===
- RMC Roadstone †
- No 7 Jetty (ex-Rugby Cement) (currently vacant)
- Thunderer Jetty (TDG Dagenham, now Norbert Dentressangle - petrol, distillates, aviation fuel, biofuels, tallow, ethanol, fertilisers, urea etc.)
- Pinnacle Terminal †
- White Mountain Roadstone †
- Hunts Wharf (Van Dalen) †
- Stolthaven Dagenham (fuel and oils)
- Hanson Aggregates †
- Ford Dagenham Terminal †

=== Rainham ===
- Phoenix Wharf/Frog Island †
- site of Murex works
- Tilda Rice †
- Veolia jetty and landfill site
- Coldharbour Point

=== Purfleet ===
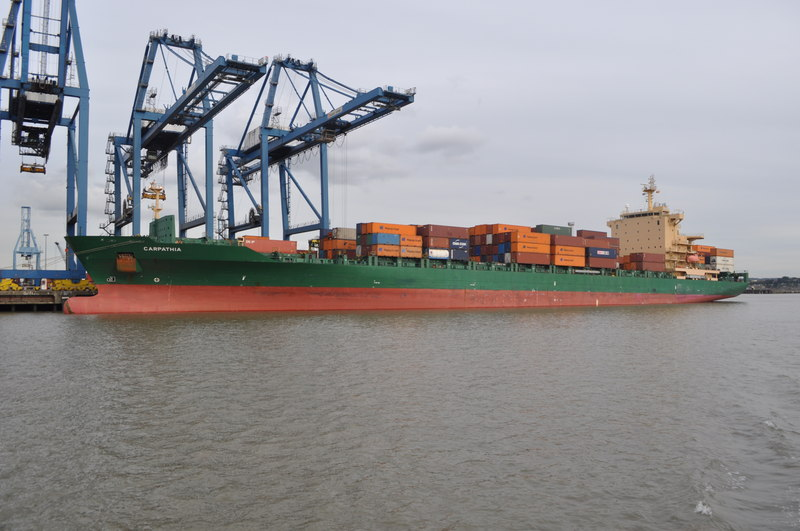
Container ship Carpathia unloading at Northfleet Hope terminal, Tilbury

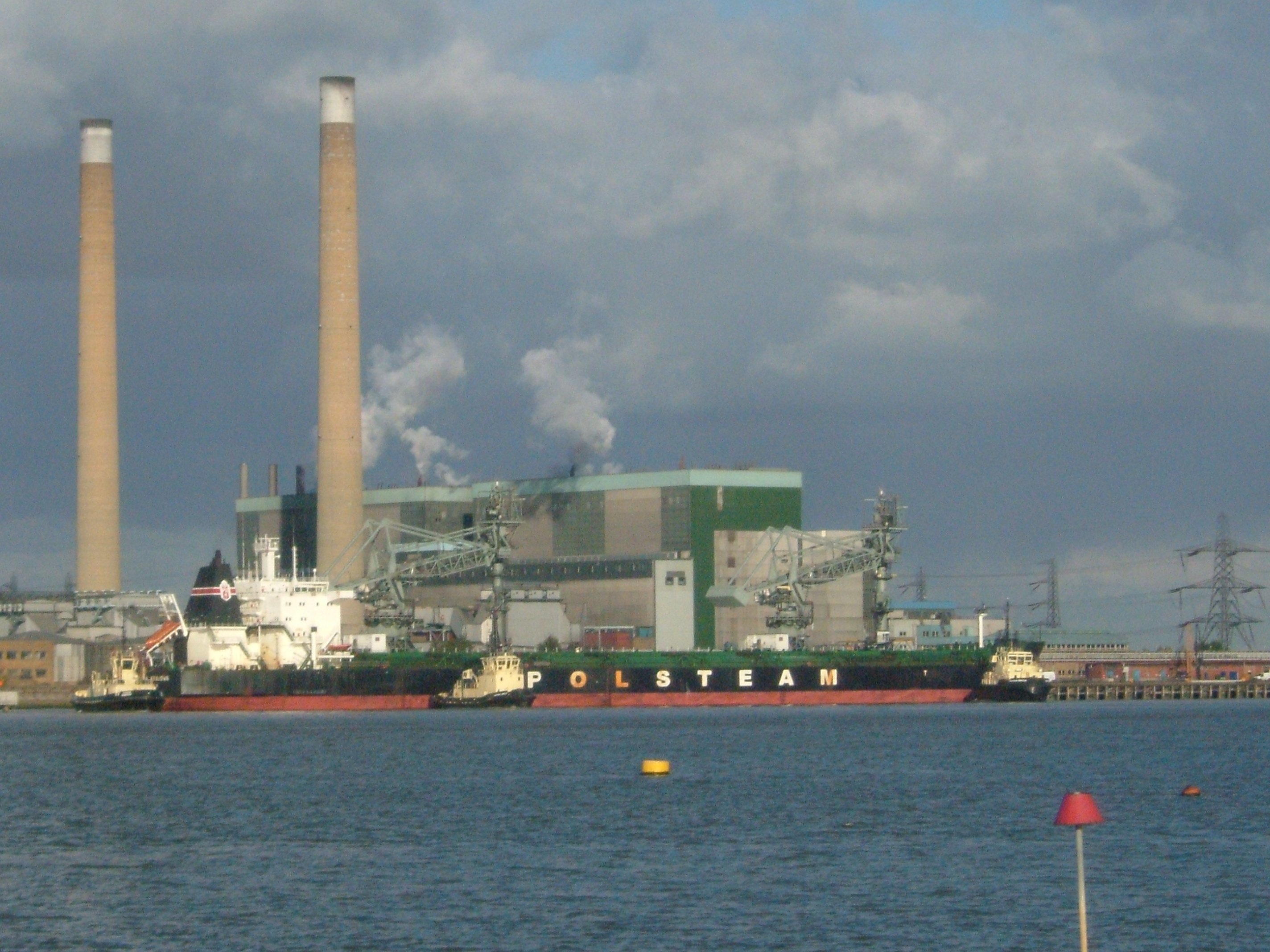
A Panamax coal ship berths by Tilbury Power Station

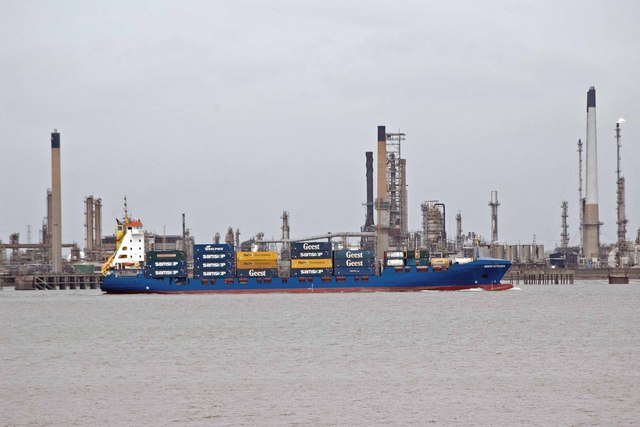
MV Neuburg Geeststroom heading downstream past Coryton Refinery, 2007

- Mar Dyke
- Esso - ExxonMobil (liquid bulks – petroleum products, lubricants and solvents)
- CLdN Purfleet (RO-RO ferries)
- Jurgen's Jetty (Pura Foods)
- Van den Bergh Jetty (Unilever margarine works – edible oils)
- Civil & Marine Jetty (Upper & Lower)
- Purfleet Aggregates

(Dartford Crossing)

=== West Thurrock and Grays ===
- Lafarge Jetty (sea-dredged aggregates)
- Thurrock Marine Terminal (dry bulk cement)
- Navigator Terminals Ltd. (formerly Vopak Terminal London) (liquid bulks - petroleum products and chemicals - liquid fertilisers, gases; vegetable oils and fats)
- Stone Ness
- West Thurrock Jetty (ICL chemical works - dry bulks; chemical powders)
- Procter & Gamble detergent works
- Gibbs Wharf (dry bulk - limestone aggregate, coal and other minerals)
- Nustar Grays Terminal (diesel, gas oil, paraffin, petrol, ethanol)
- Bruce's Wharf
- Goldsmith's Wharf

=== Tilbury ===
See Port of Tilbury for the main dock system.

- Tilbury Grain Terminal (cereals)
- Northfleet Hope Terminal (containers)
- Tilbury Ness
- London International Cruise Terminal, Tilbury
- Tilbury 2 roll on/roll off terminal (formerly Tilbury Power Station)
- East Tilbury landfill wharf
- Coalhouse Point
- Mucking wharf (refuse)

=== Shell Haven, Coryton, Canvey Island and Southend ===
- London Gateway port, formerly Shell Haven oil refinery
- Thames Haven
- Thames Oilport, formerly Coryton Refinery
- Hole Haven, proposed (1972) Occidental refinery, unused jetties extant
- Oikos Storage, formerly London & Coastal Oil Wharves Ltd, Canvey Island
- Texaco Ltd, formerly Regent Oil Company, Canvey Island (closed 1985)
- Calor Gas Terminal, formerly North Thames Gas Board/British Gas Corporation, Canvey Island
- Deadman's Point
- Billet wharf, Leigh-on-Sea (shellfish)
- Victoria wharf
- Strand wharf
- Bell wharf, Leigh-on-Sea
- Crow Stone, Southend (former seaward limit of Port of London)
- Southend Pier
- Southend Corporation loading pier
- Gas works pier, Southend
- Barge pier, Shoeburyness
- Gog's Berth, Shoeburyness
