= Royal Victoria Dock =

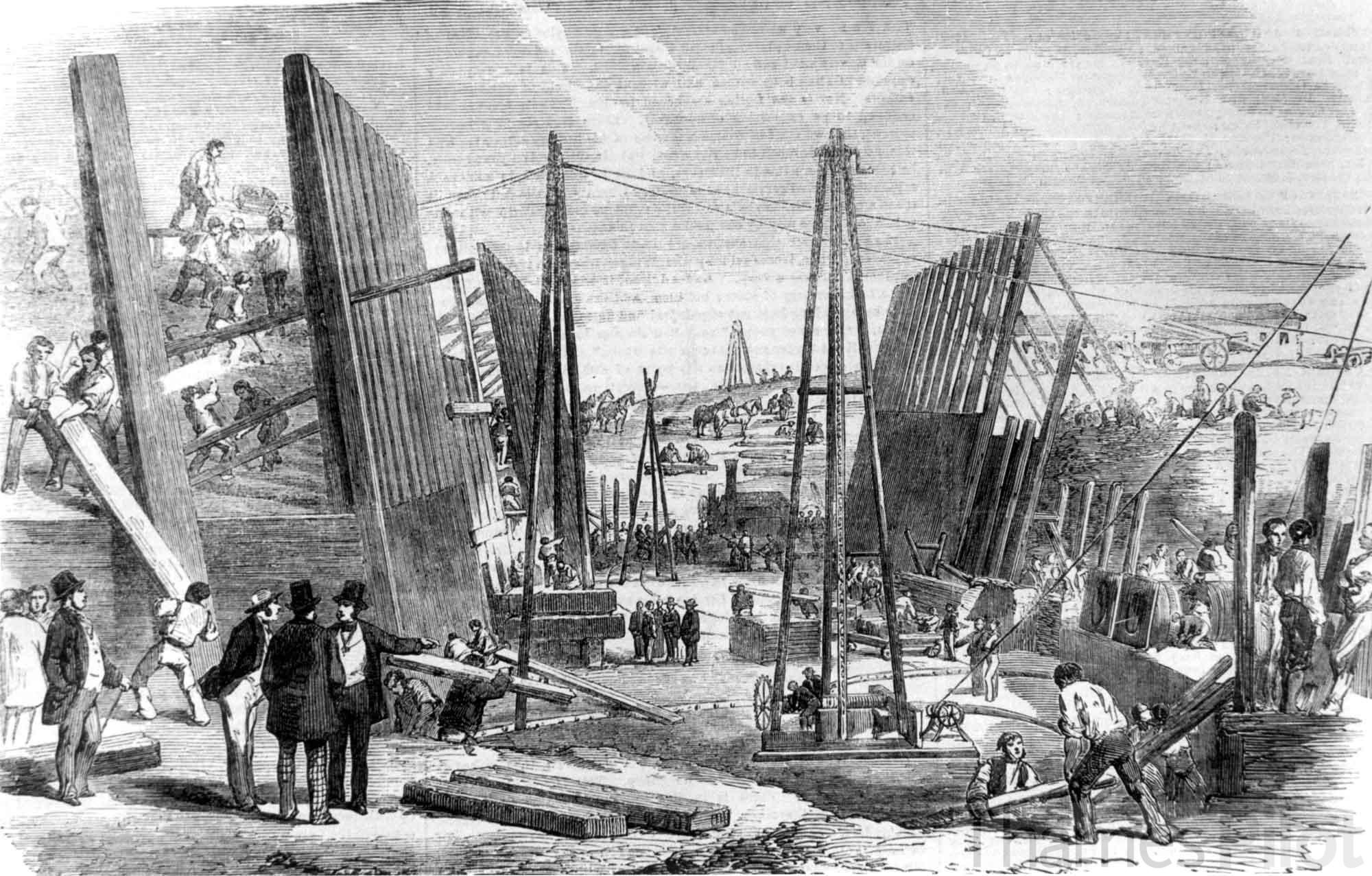
- The building of Victoria Dock

- Location within London Borough of Newham
- 51.505823°N 0.029714°E
- Location: London

History
- Built: 1855

Site notes
- Architect: George Parker Bidder

The Royal Victoria Dock is the largest of three docks in the Royal Docks of east London, now part of the redeveloped Docklands.

== History ==
Victoria (London) Dock Act 1850
- Act of Parliament
- Parliament of the United Kingdom
- Long title: An Act to authorize the Construction of a Dock on the North Side of the River Thames, to be called "The Victoria (London) Dock."
- Citation: 13 & 14 Vict. c. li
- Territorial extent: United Kingdom

Dates
- Royal assent: 15 July 1850
- Commencement: 15 July 1850 (Note: The Acts of Parliament (Commencement) Act 1793.)
Other legislation
Repealed by	Victoria (London) Docks Act 1853

Status: Repealed

Text of statute as originally enacted

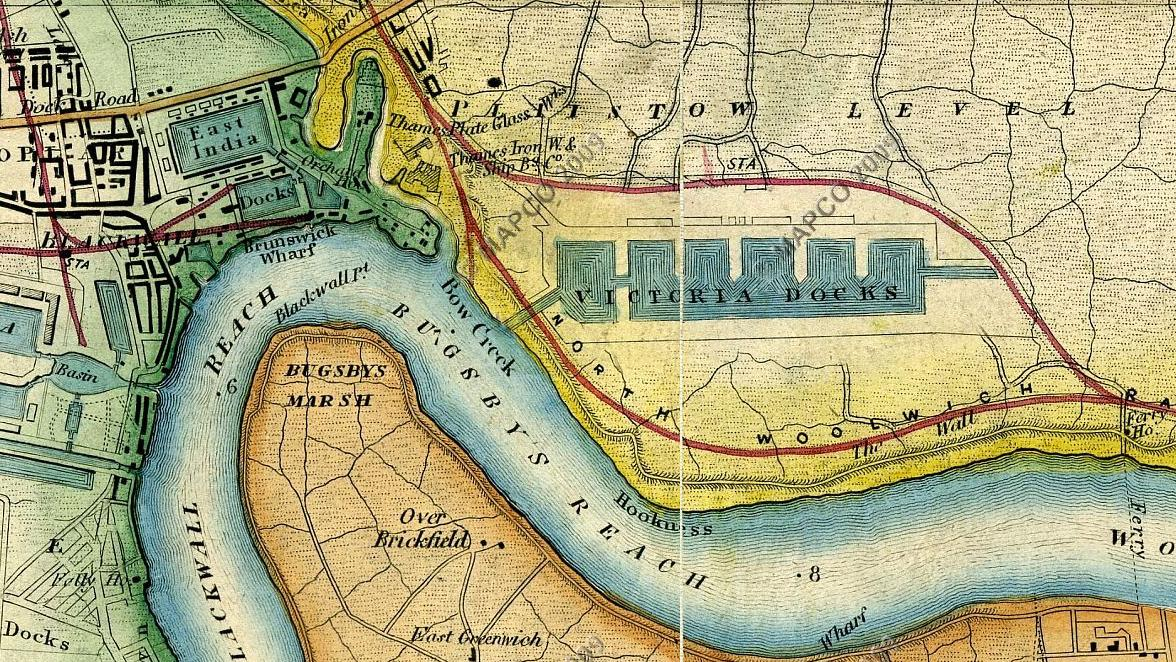
Map c1872, showing Victoria Docks, now Royal Victoria Dock, Bow Creek and the Thames Ironworks and Shipbuilding Company

Map 1908, showing Canning Town, Royal Victoria Dock, part of Royal Albert Dock

Victoria (London) Docks Act 1857 (Note: Section 1.)
- Act of Parliament
- Parliament of the United Kingdom
- Long title: An Act for authorizing the Victoria (London) Dock Company to make a new Cut Eastward of their Dock, and to raise additional Capital, and for other Purposes.
- Citation: 20 & 21 Vict. c. lxxxiii
- Territorial extent: United Kingdom

Dates
- Royal assent: 27 July 1857
- Commencement: 27 July 1857
Other legislation
Amended by	Victoria (London) Dock Act 1859; London and Saint Katharine Docks Act 1864

Status: Amended

Text of statute as originally enacted

Victoria (London) Dock Act 1859
- Act of Parliament
- Parliament of the United Kingdom
- Long title: An Act to extend the Time for the Completion of certain Works of the Victoria (London) Dock Company; and for other Purposes.
- Citation: 22 Vict. c. xxix
- Territorial extent: United Kingdom

Dates
- Royal assent: 19 April 1859
- Commencement: 19 April 1859
Other legislation
Amends	Victoria (London) Docks Act 1857
Amended by	London and Saint Katharine Docks Act 1864

Status: Amended

Authorised by the Victoria (London) Dock Act 1850 (13 & 14 Vict. c. li), the dock was built by the Victoria (London) Dock Company and opened in 1855, on a previously uninhabited area of the Plaistow Marshes. It was the first of the Royal Docks, and the first London dock to be designed specifically to accommodate large steamships. It was also the first to use hydraulic power to operate its machinery, and the first to be connected to the national railway network, via the Eastern Counties and Thames Junction Railway section of what is now the North London line. It was initially known as "Victoria Dock"; the prefix "Royal" was granted in 1880.

The dock was connected to the national rail network via a line which ran between Canning Town and North Woolwich. When the Victoria Dock was first built, the railway cut along the docks; to correct this, a swing bridge was built over the entrance to the dock. But this increased journey times, and so a new line was built in 1855, to take the route around the north side of the dock to Silvertown, and a station at Custom House opened where it reconnected with the original line. The older southern line was kept to serve local factories, where it was known as the Silvertown Tramway.

The Victoria Dock consisted of a main dock and a basin to the west, providing an entrance to the Thames on the western side of the complex. The dock was deeply indented with four solid piers, each 152 m long by 43 m wide, on which were constructed two-storey warehouses. Other warehouses, granaries, shed and storage buildings surrounded the dock, which had a total of 3.6 km of quays.

The dock was an immediate commercial success, as it could easily accommodate all but the very largest steamships. By 1860, it was already taking over 850,000 tons of shipping a year – double that of the London Docks, four times that of St Katharine Docks and 70% more than the West India Docks and East India Docks combined.

The Victoria (London) Dock Company merged with the Saint Katharine Dock Company and the London Dock Company by the London and Saint Katharine Docks Act 1864 (27 & 28 Vict. c. clxxviii), with the dock becoming part of the London and Saint Katharine Docks Company.

The dock was renamed the 'Royal Victoria Dock' in 1880.

The London and Saint Katharine and East and West India Docks Act 1888 (51 & 52 Vict. c. cxliii) passed management of the dock to the London and India Docks Joint Committee. The London and Saint Katharine Docks Company formally merged with the East and West India Dock Company by the London and India Docks Amalgamation Act 1900 (63 & 64 Vict. c. cxi), becoming the London and India Docks Company on 1 January 1901. On 31 March 1909, by the Port of London Act 1908 (8 Edw. 7. c. 68), the London and India Docks Company was taken over by the Port of London Authority.

=== World War II onwards ===
The Royal Victoria Dock was badly damaged by German bombing in the Second World War, but trade recovered after the war. From the 1960s onwards, the Royal Victoria steadily declined – as did all of London's other docks – as the shipping industry adopted containerisation, which moved traffic downstream to the Port of Tilbury. The Royal Victoria Dock finally closed to commercial traffic along with the other Royal Docks in 1981.

In 1988, the dilapidated site was chosen by French electronic musician Jean-Michel Jarre as the site for one of his signature large-scale concerts, eventually titled Destination Docklands. The area also inspired him to write the album Revolutions specifically for the event.

The London Docklands Development Corporation initiated a major redevelopment at the dock in the 1990s. Developments included Britannia Village, which was carried out by Wimpey Homes, the Peabody Trust and the East Thames Housing Group in the mid-1990s.

Most of the original buildings were demolished, but a few historic warehouses survived. More recent development has included the Royal Victoria Dock Bridge completed in 1998, and the ExCeL Exhibition Centre, constructed on the north quayside, which opened in November 2000.

== Events ==
On 15 August 2009, the dock hosted the inaugural Great London Swim, a mass participation open water swim over a one-mile distance. The event has been held annually since then but on the first weekend in July. On 16 to 17 June 2018, the dock hosted the F1H2O Grand Prix of London won by Erik Stark. Britannia Village has its own Community Foundation.

Royal Victoria Dock is the starting location for the annual Docklands Head, a rowing head race hosted by Poplar Blackwall and District Rowing Club. The race starts under the Royal Victoria Dock Bridge and proceeds eastwards underneath Connaught Footbridge and Connaught Road Bridge, finishing at the eastern end of the Royal Albert Dock.

== Gallery ==
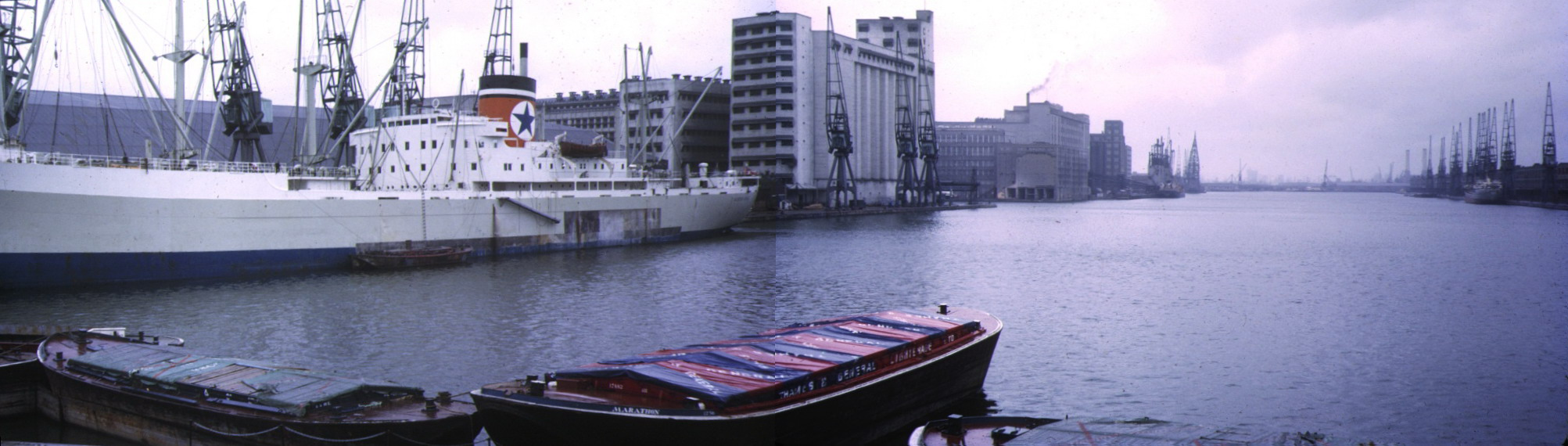
Looking west from Connaught Road swing bridge in 1973

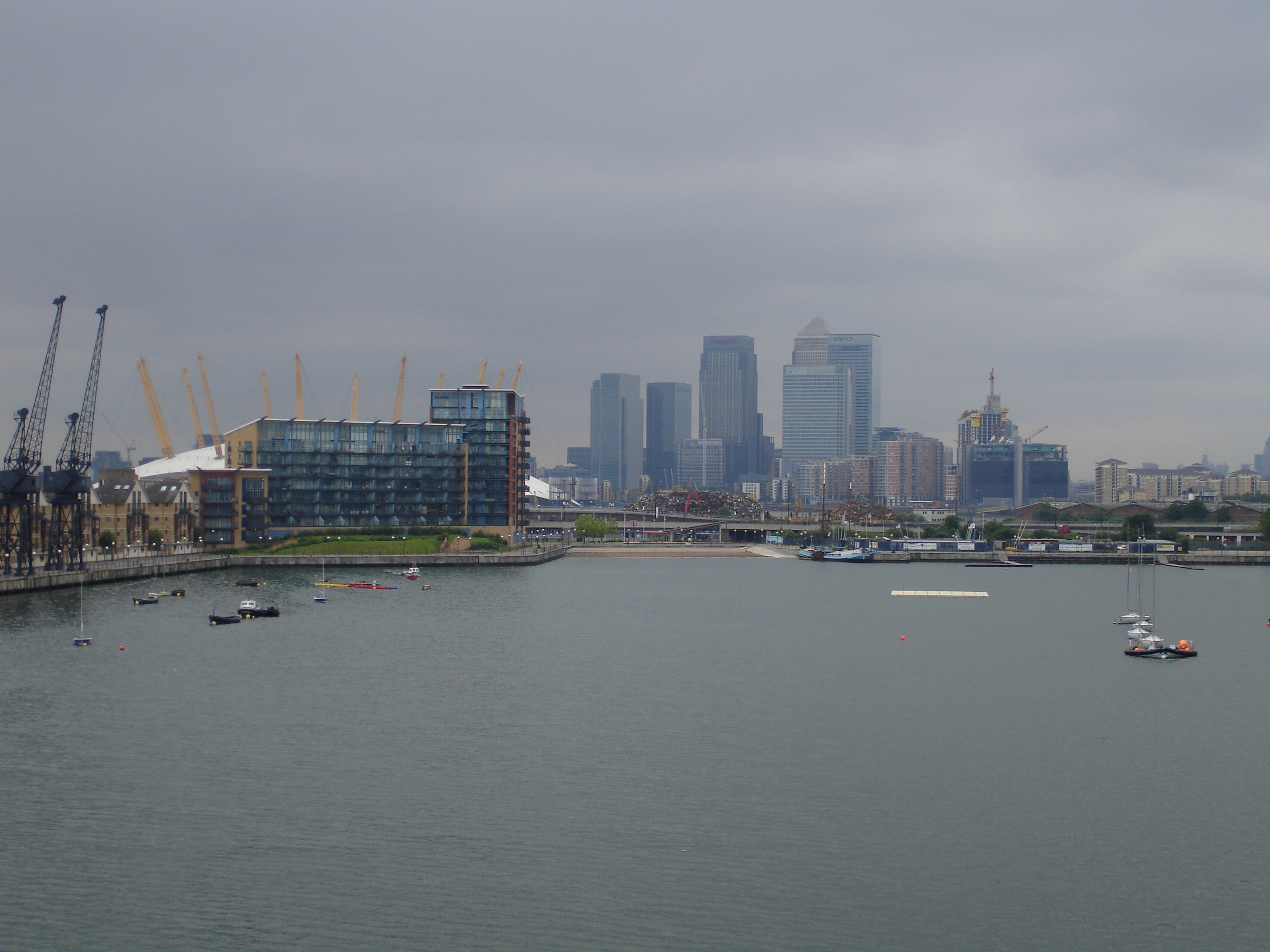
Looking west towards Canary Wharf

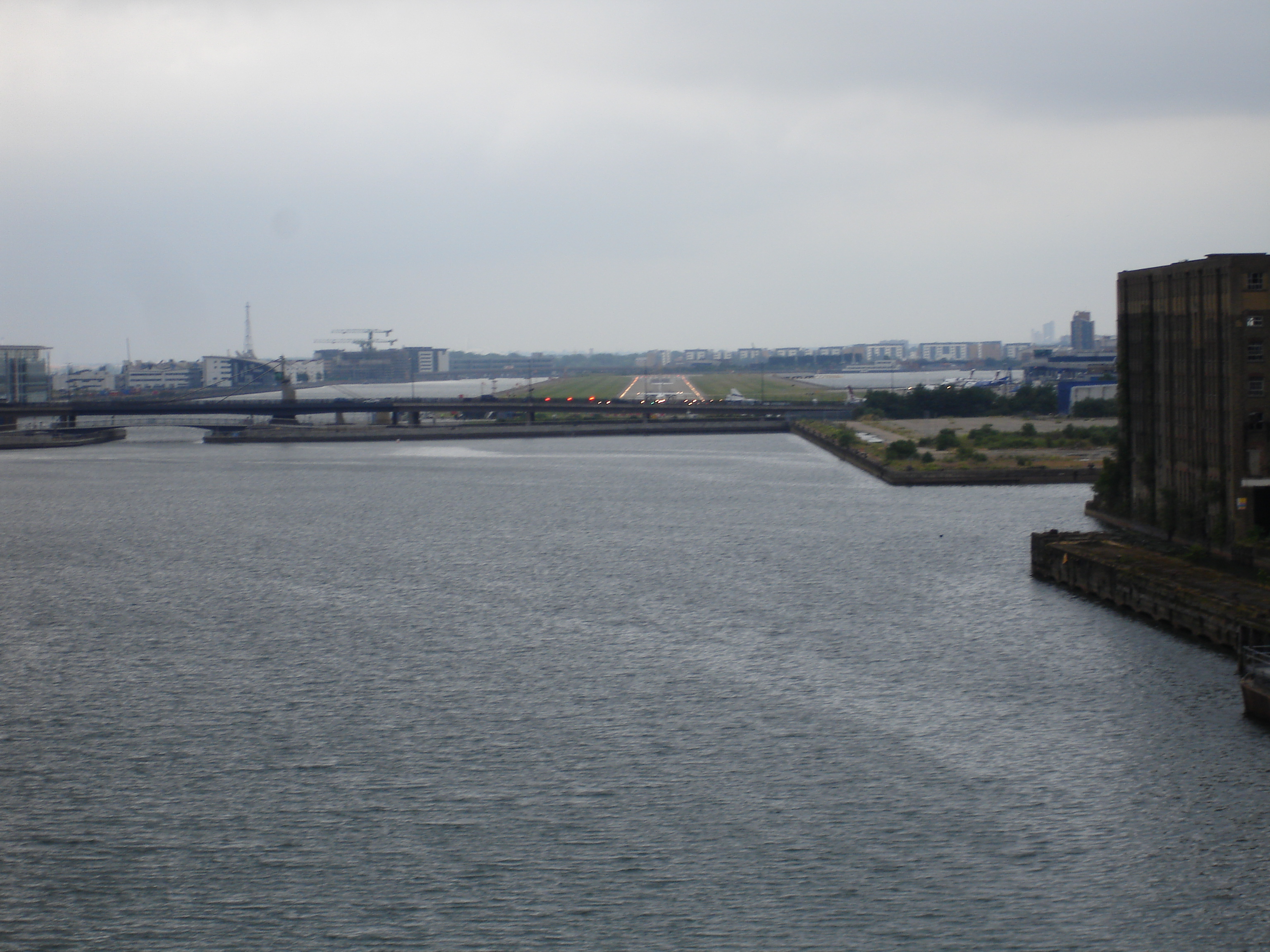
Looking east to London City Airport

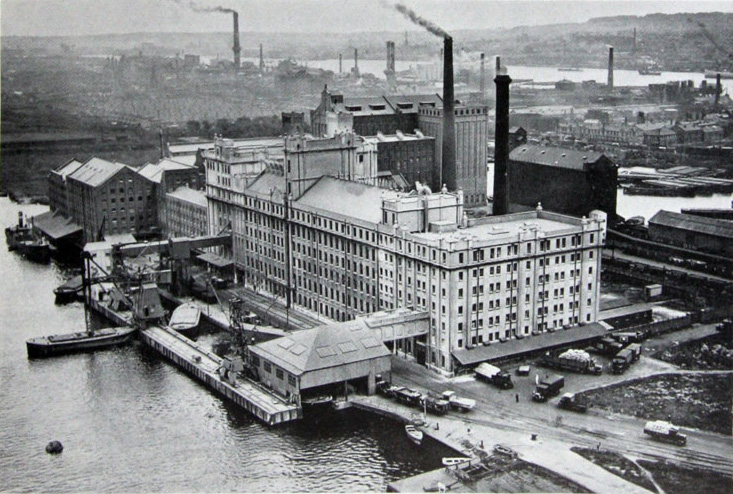
Spiller's Millennium Mills in 1934. Behind is the Graving Dock

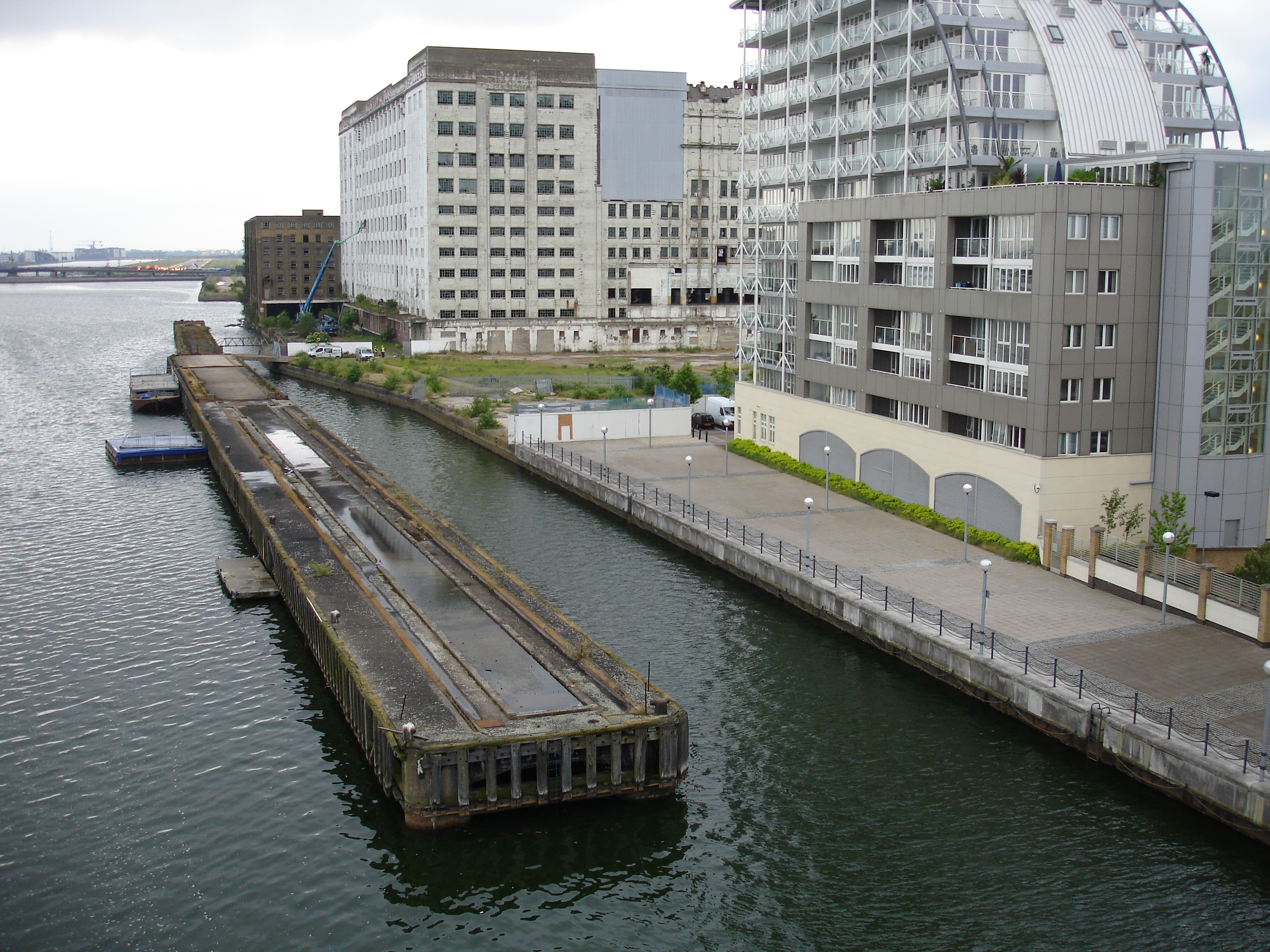
Looking south: some new development but Spillers Mills in need of renovation

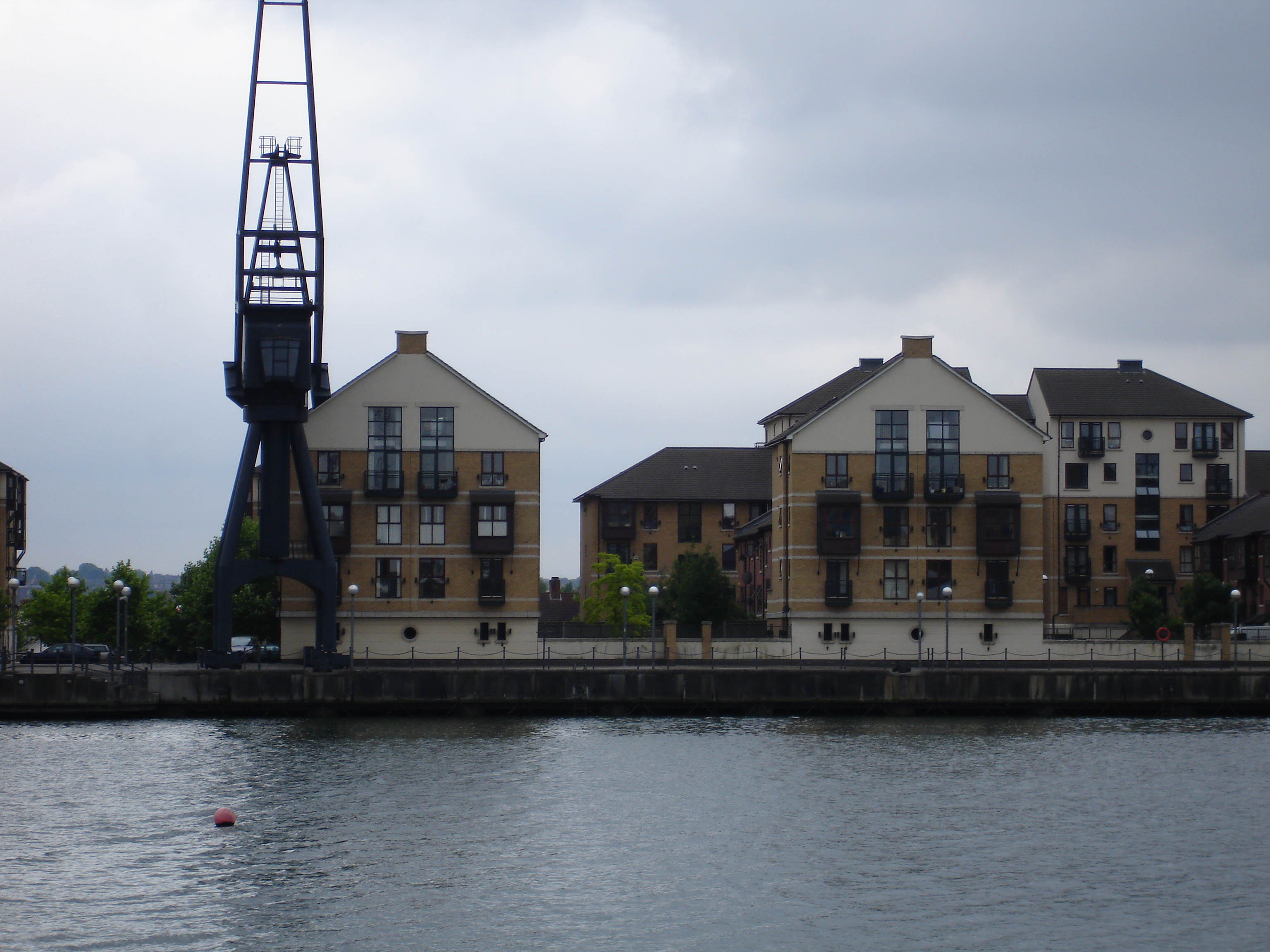
Looking south: some new development and cranes as memory of the past

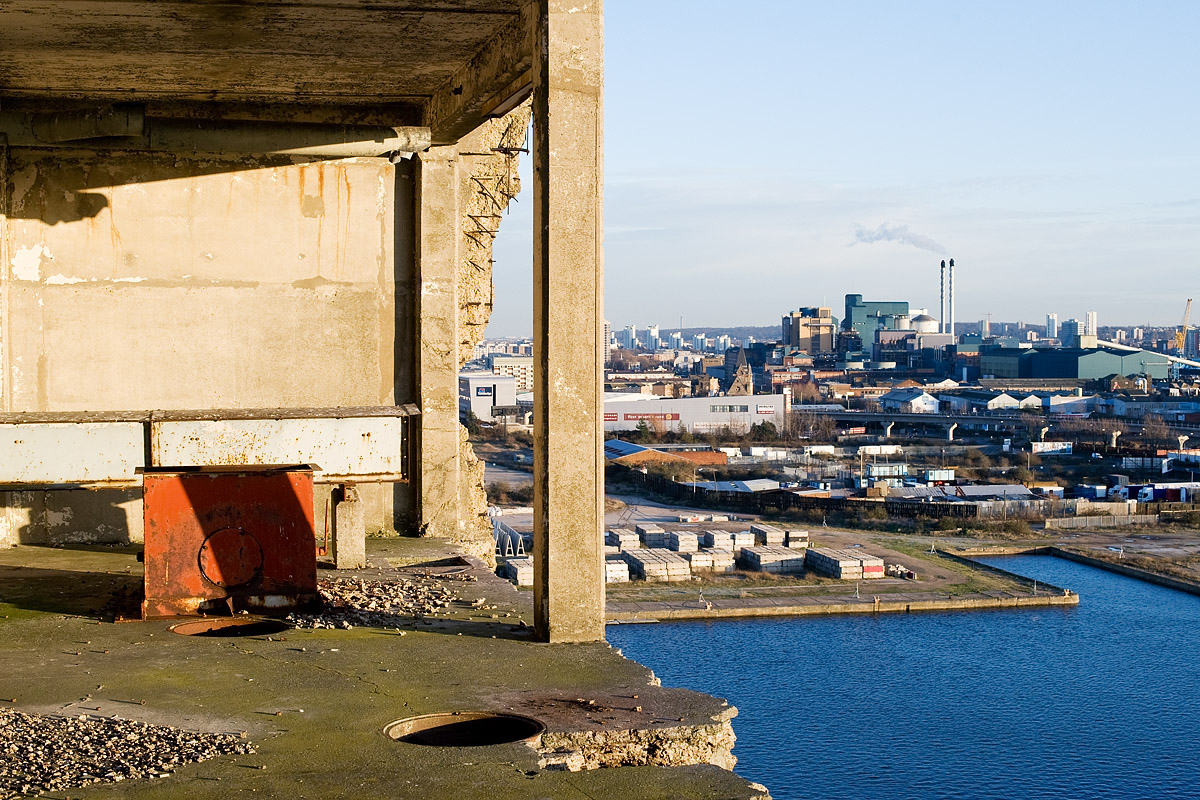
Looking east-south-east from the top of Spillers Millennium Mills

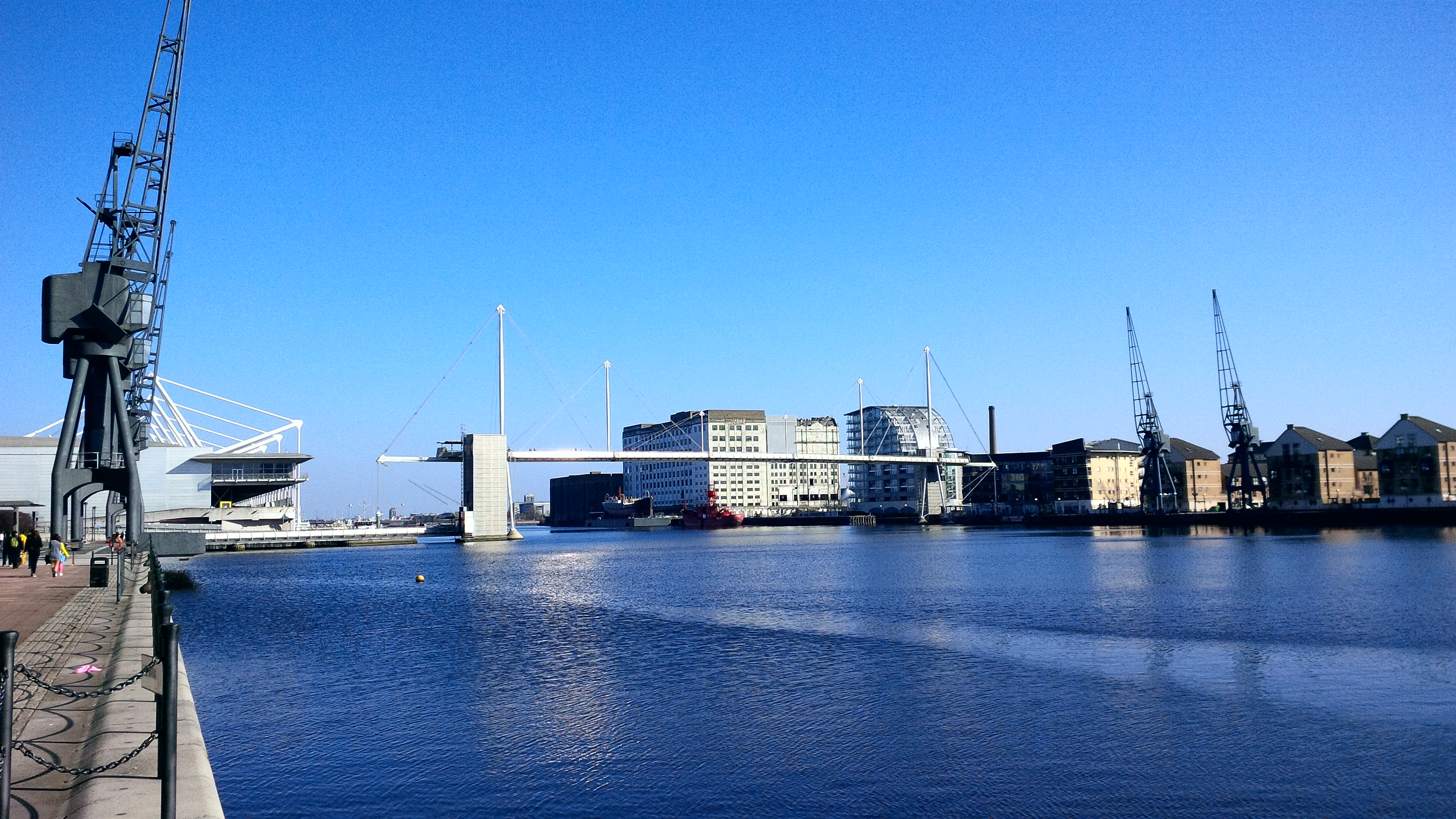
Looking east towards the ExCeL Exhibition Centre

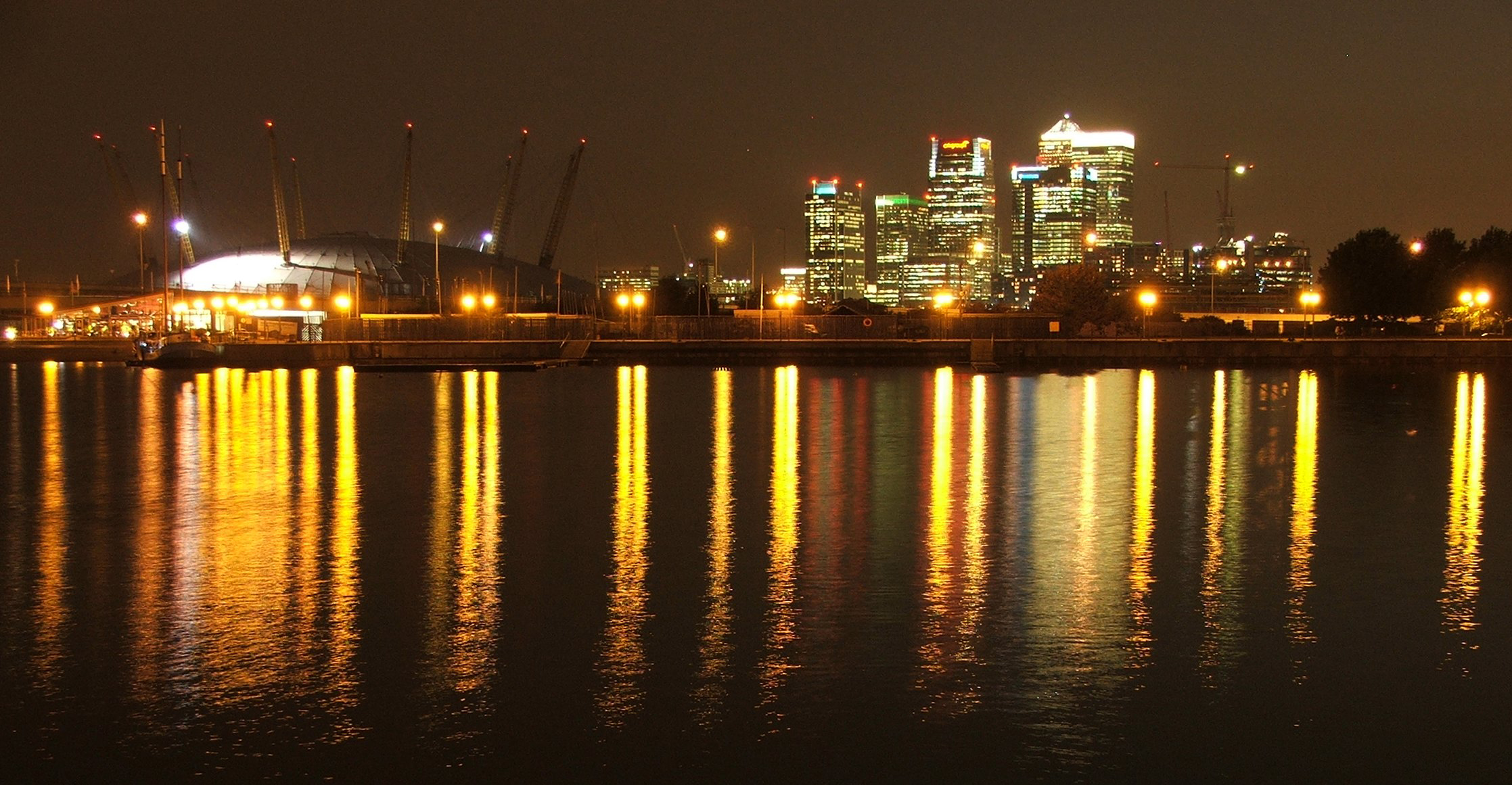
The O2 and Canary Wharf from the Royal Victoria Dock

== See also ==
- King George V Dock, London
- Royal Victoria Square
