= Victoria (London) Docks Act 1853 =

Act of the Parliament of the United Kingdom

Victoria (London) Docks Act 1853 (Note: Section 2.)
- Act of Parliament
- Parliament of the United Kingdom
- Long title: An Act to authorize the Construction of additional Docks and other Works in connexion with the Victoria (London) Docks, and to consolidate and amend the Provisions of the Act relating to such Docks.
- Citation: 16 & 17 Vict. c. cxxxi
- Territorial extent: United Kingdom

Dates
- Royal assent: 4 August 1853
- Commencement: 4 August 1853 (Note: The Acts of Parliament (Commencement) Act 1793.)
Other legislation
Repeals/revokes	See § Repealed enactments
Amended by	Victoria (London) Dock Act 1859; London and Saint Katharine Docks Act 1864; London and Saint Katharine Docks Company Act 1875

Status: Amended

Text of statute as originally enacted

The Victoria (London) Docks Act 1853 (16 & 17 Vict. c. cxxxi) is a local act of the Parliament of the United Kingdom that consolidated and amended the provisions of an earlier act incorporating the Victoria (London) Dock Company, and authorised the company to construct additional docks and works in connection with the Victoria (London) Docks on the north bank of the River Thames in West Ham.

== Provisions ==
=== Repealed enactments ===
Section 1 of the act repealed one enactment, listed in that section.

Citation	Short title	Description	Extent of repeal
13 & 14 Vict. c. li	Victoria (London) Dock Act 1850	An Act to authorize the Construction of a Dock on the North Side of the River Thames, to be called "The Victoria (London) Dock."	The whole act.

== Subsequent developments ==
In 1864 the Victoria (London) Dock Company was amalgamated with the London Dock Company and the St Katharine Dock Company to form the London and St Katharine Docks Company, which went on to build the adjoining Royal Albert Dock as an extension of the Victoria Dock. The London and St Katharine Docks Company in turn merged with the East and West India Dock Company on 1 January 1901 to form the London and India Docks Company. The undertaking of the London and India Docks Company, together with those of the Surrey Commercial Dock Company and the Millwall Dock Company, was transferred to the newly established Port of London Authority under the Port of London Act 1908 (8 Edw. 7. c. 68), with effect from 31 March 1909.
