= South Quay =

South Quay or South Quays can refer to

== In London, England ==
- South Quay DLR station, a light railway station on the Isle of Dogs
- South Quay Estate, a mid-rise residential development adjoining St. Katherine's Docks in Wapping
- South Quay Plaza, a residential-led development on the Isle of Dogs

== Elsewhere ==
- South Quay, the original name of Victoria Quay, Fremantle, Western Australia
- South Quay-USJ 1 BRT station, a bus rapid transit station in Klang Valley, Malaysia
- South Quays, an area of Dublin quays, in Dublin, Ireland

== See also ==
- 1996 Docklands bombing, also known as the South Quay bombing, a terrorist bombing on the Isle of Dogs in London, England
- South Dock (disambiguation)
