= Royal Victoria Square =

Square in East London

Coordinates: 51.507620°N 0.024010°E

Royal Victoria Square is a square adjoining the ExCel Exhibition Centre in Royal Victoria Dock in the Docklands area of East London. It was designed by Patel Taylor Architects and engineered by Aspen Burrow Crocker.

The square was completed in 2001, at a cost of £3.5 million. It received the Landscape Institute Design Award in 2004. A distinctive feature of the square are two elongated canopies cantilevered from black precast-concrete fins, with names punched through the canopy of the trading cities and ships that used to visit the nearby dock.

The square also features the sculpture 'Landed' by Les Johnson on its eastern end. It was unveiled in 2009 at a cost of over £250,000.

== Gallery ==
Royal Victoria Square
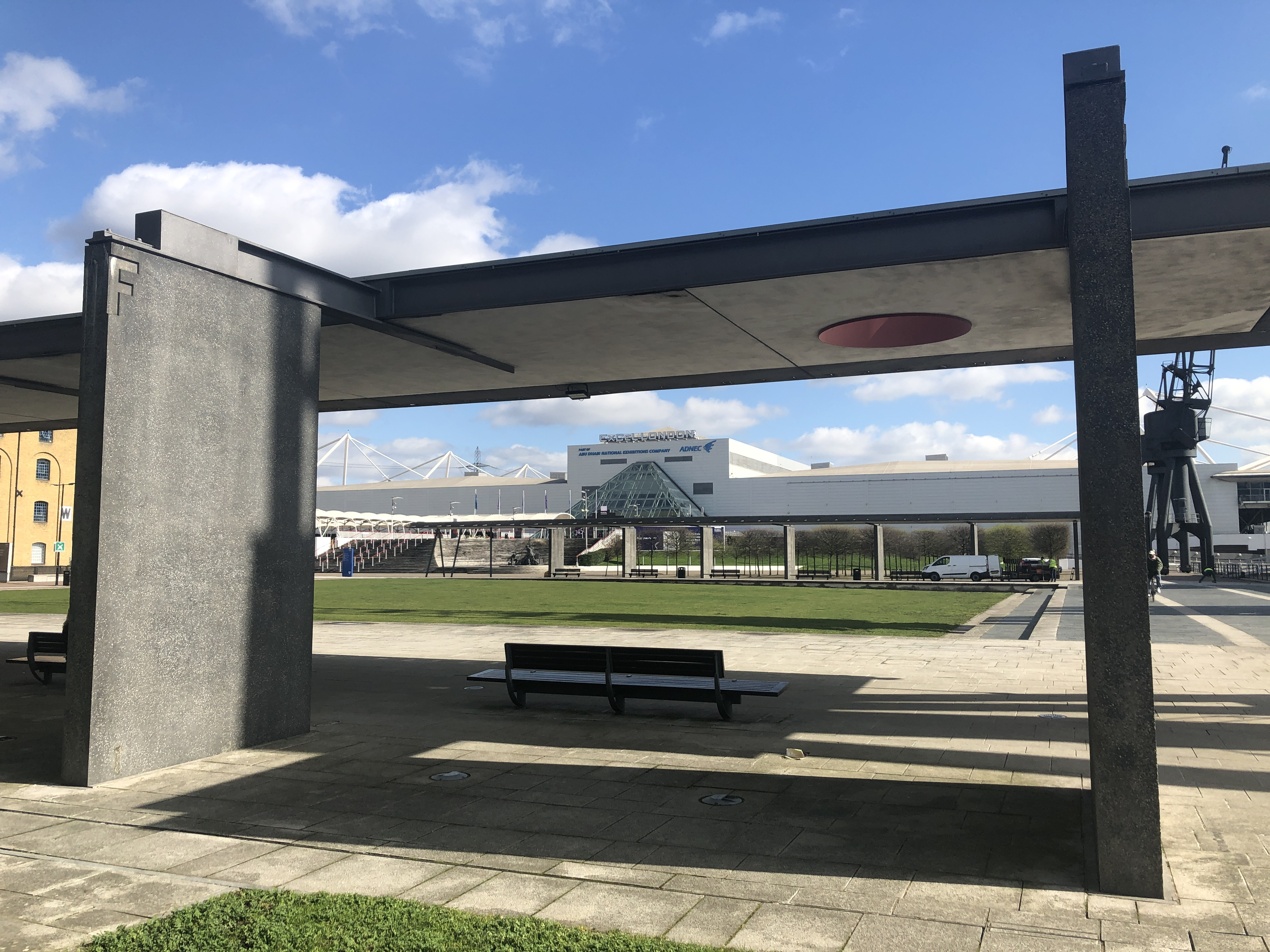
Canopy F at Royal Victoria Square (2020)

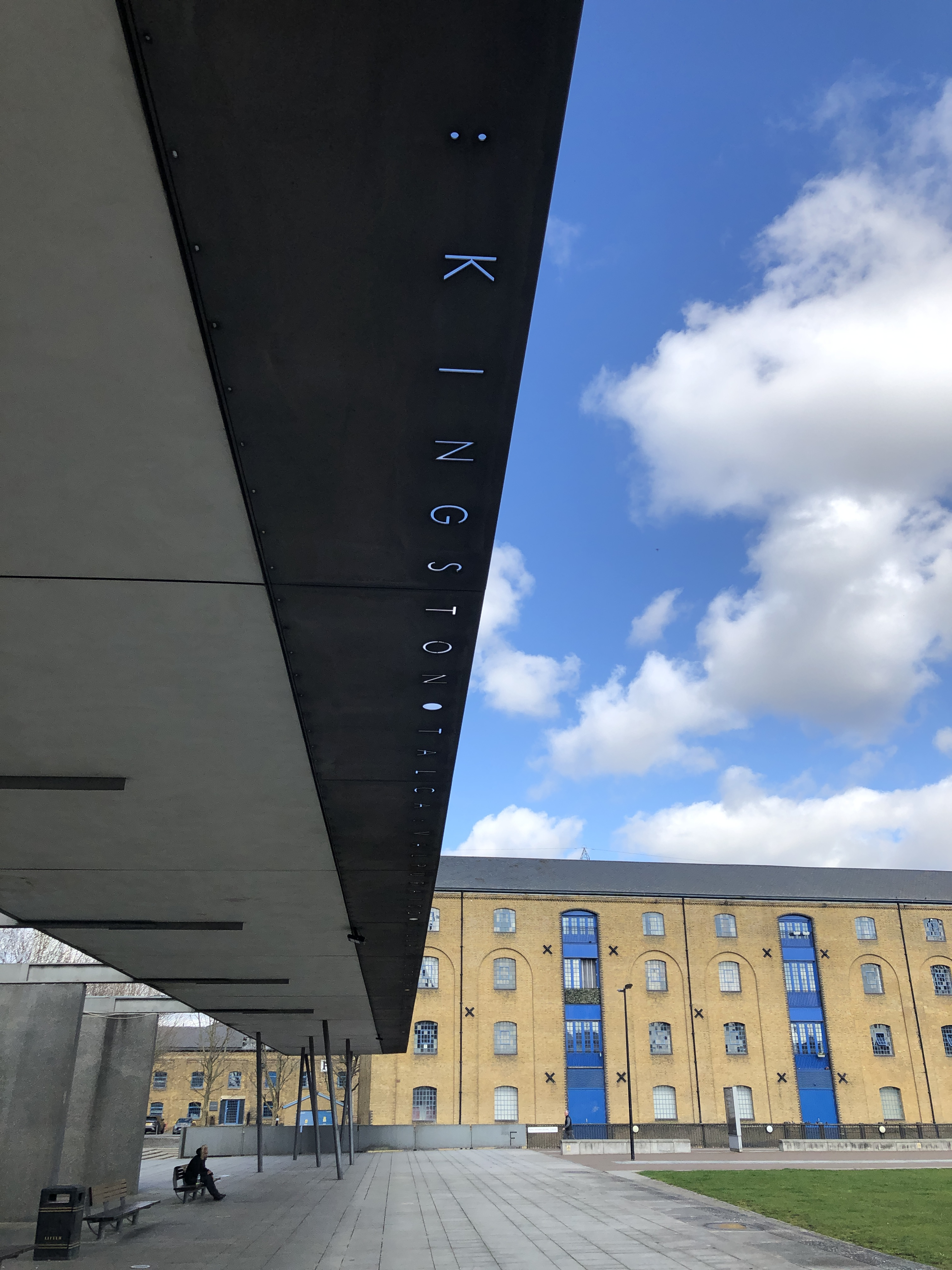
Kingston cutout on Canopy F (2020)

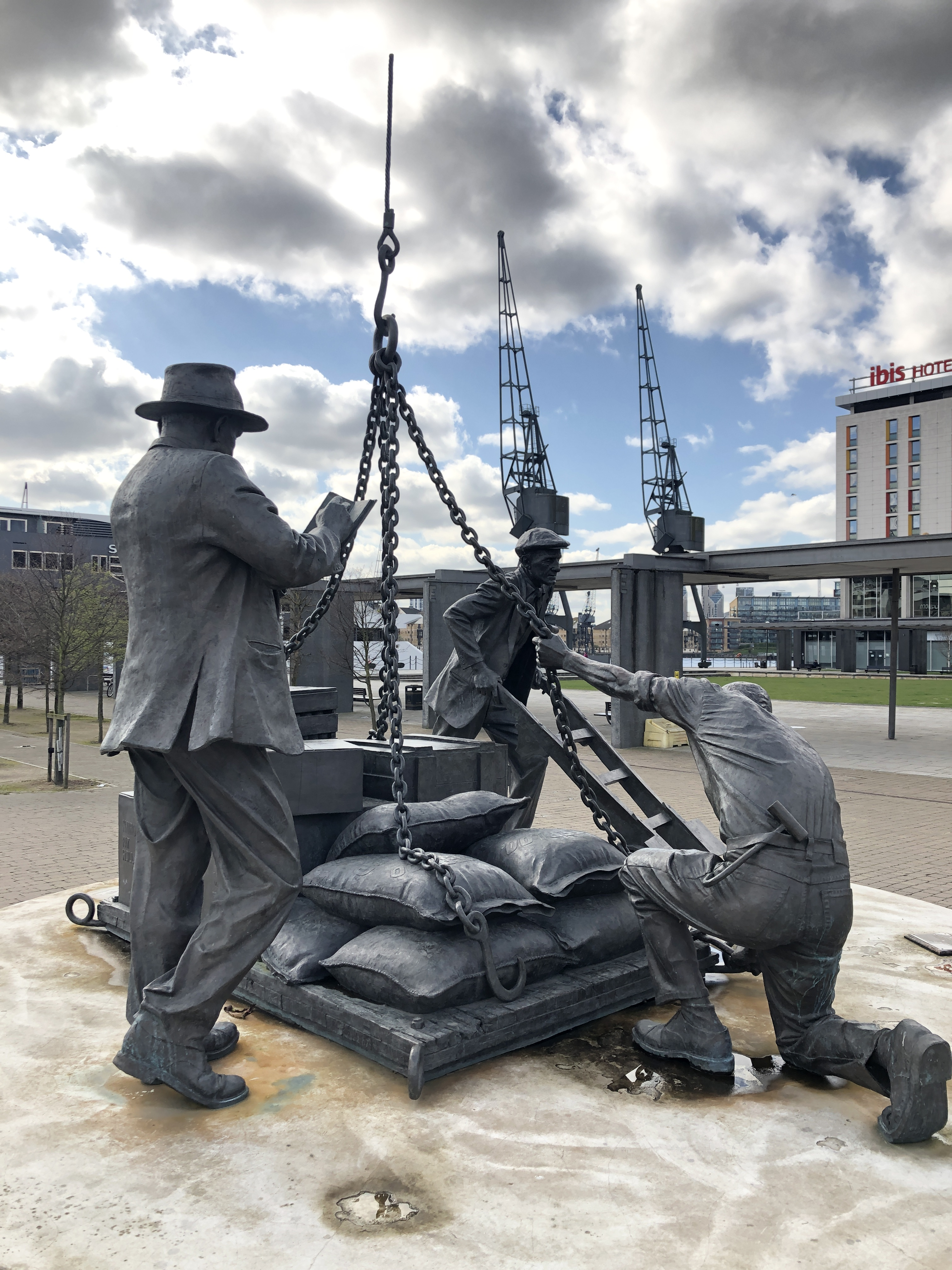
Landed by Les Johnson

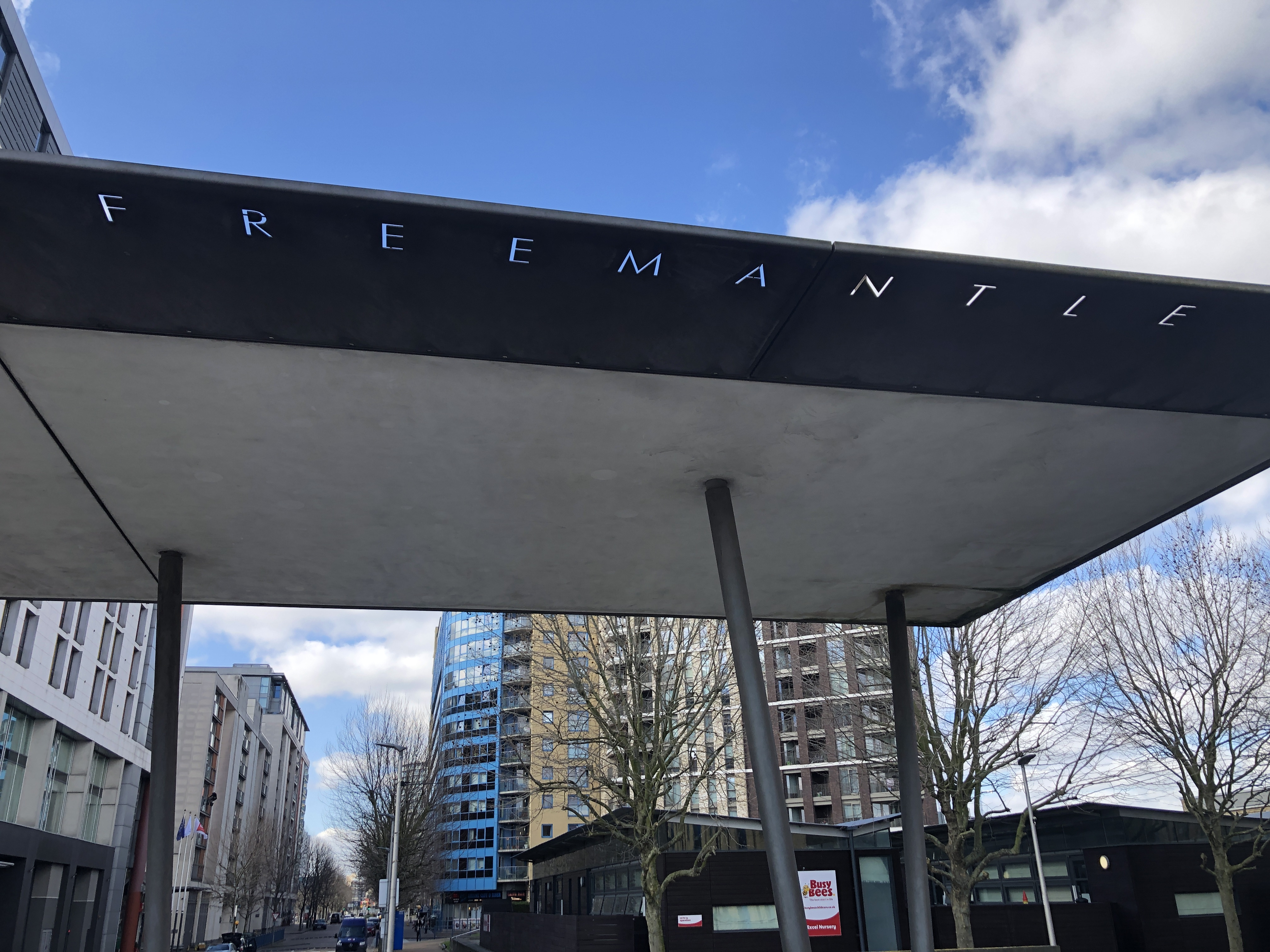
Freemantle cutout on Canopy F (2020)

== See also ==
- Royal Victoria Dock
