= London and Saint Katharine Docks Act 1864 =

Act of the Parliament of the United Kingdom

London and Saint Katharine Docks Act 1864 (Note: Section 1.)
- Act of Parliament
- Parliament of the United Kingdom
- Long title: An Act for the Amalgamation of the London Dock Company and the Saint Katharine Dock Company into One Company by the Name "The London and Saint Katharine Docks Company," and for the Transfer to that Company and the Amalgamation with their Undertaking and Docks of the Undertaking and Docks of the Victoria (London) Dock Company; and for other Purposes.
- Citation: 27 & 28 Vict. c. clxxviii
- Territorial extent: United Kingdom

Dates
- Royal assent: 14 July 1864
- Commencement: 1 July 1864 (Note: Section 2.)
- Repealed: 23 December 1920
Other legislation
Repeals/revokes	See § Repealed enactments
Repealed by	Port of London (Consolidation) Act 1920

Status: Repealed

Text of statute as originally enacted

The London and Saint Katharine Docks Act 1864 (27 & 28 Vict. c. clxxviii) was a local act of the Parliament of the United Kingdom that amalgamated the London Dock Company and the Saint Katharine Dock Company into a single company, the London and Saint Katharine Docks Company, and transferred to that company the undertaking and docks of the Victoria (London) Dock Company.

== Provisions ==
=== Repealed enactments ===
Section 10 of the act repealed 9 enactments relating to the London Dock Company and the Saint Katharine Dock Company, listed in that section, with effect from the commencement of the act.

Citation	Short title	Description	Extent of repeal
9 Geo. 4. c. cxvi	London Docks Act 1828	An Act to consolidate and amend the several Acts for making the London Docks.	The whole act.
16 & 17 Vict. c. cvi	London Docks Act 1853	An Act to authorize the London Dock Company to make a new Entrance to their Docks from the River Thames and other Works, and to augment their Capital Stock, and for other Purposes connected with the said Docks.	The whole act.
19 & 20 Vict. c. i	London Docks Act 1856	An Act to enable the London Dock Company to raise a further Sum of Money.	The whole act.
21 & 22 Vict. c. xxxv	London Docks Act 1858	N/A	The whole act.
6 Geo. 4. c. cv	St. Katharine's Dock Act 1825	An Act for making and constructing certain Wet Docks, Warehouses, and other Works in the Parish of Saint Botolph without Aldgate, and in the Parish or Precinct of Saint Katharine near the Tower of London, in the County of Middlesex.	The whole act.
10 Geo. 4. c. i	St. Katharine Dock Act 1829	An Act to amend an Act passed in the Sixth Year of the Reign of His present Majesty, intituled "An Act for making and constructing certain Wet Docks, Warehouses, and other Works in the Parish of Saint Botolph without Aldgate, and in the Parish or Precinct of Saint Katharine near the Tower of London, in the County of Middlesex," and for extending the Powers and Provisions of the said Act.	The whole act.
11 Geo. 4 & 1 Will. 4. c. xiii	St. Katharine Dock Act 1830	An Act to amend and alter Two several Acts passed in the Sixth and Tenth Years of the Reign of His present Majesty, for making and constructing certain Wet Docks, Warehouses, and other Works in the Parish of Saint Botolph without Aldgate, and in the Parish or Precinct of Saint Katharine near the Tower of London, in the County of Middlesex, and for enlarging and extending the Powers and Provisions of the said Acts.	The whole act.
2 & 3 Will. 4. c. xlix	St. Katharine Docks Act 1832	An Act to amend and enlarge the Powers of several Acts for making and maintaining the Saint Katharine Docks in the County of Middlesex.	The whole act.
6 & 7 Will. 4. c. xxxi	St. Katharine Docks Act 1836	An Act to enlarge the Powers of the several Acts passed for making and maintaining the Saint Katharine Docks in the County of Middlesex.	The whole act.

Section 61 of the act repealed a further 3 enactments relating to the Victoria (London) Dock Company, listed in that section, with effect from the transfer and amalgamation of that company's undertaking taking effect.

Citation	Short title	Description	Extent of repeal
16 & 17 Vict. c. cxxxi	Victoria (London) Docks Act 1853	An Act to authorize the Construction of additional Docks and other Works in connexion with the Victoria (London) Docks, and to consolidate and amend the Provisions of the Act relating to such Docks.	The whole act.
20 & 21 Vict. c. lxxxiii	Victoria (London) Docks Act 1857	An Act for authorizing the Victoria (London) Dock Company to make a new Cut Eastward of their Dock, and to raise additional Capital, and for other Purposes.	The whole act.
22 Vict. c. xxix	Victoria (London) Docks Act 1859	N/A	The whole act.

== Subsequent developments ==
The whole act was repealed by section 3 of, and part II of the third schedule to, the Port of London (Consolidation) Act 1920 (10 & 11 Geo. 5. c. clxxiii), which came into force on 23 December 1920.
