= South Quay Estate =

Residential development in London

Coordinates: 51.5064°N 0.0692°W

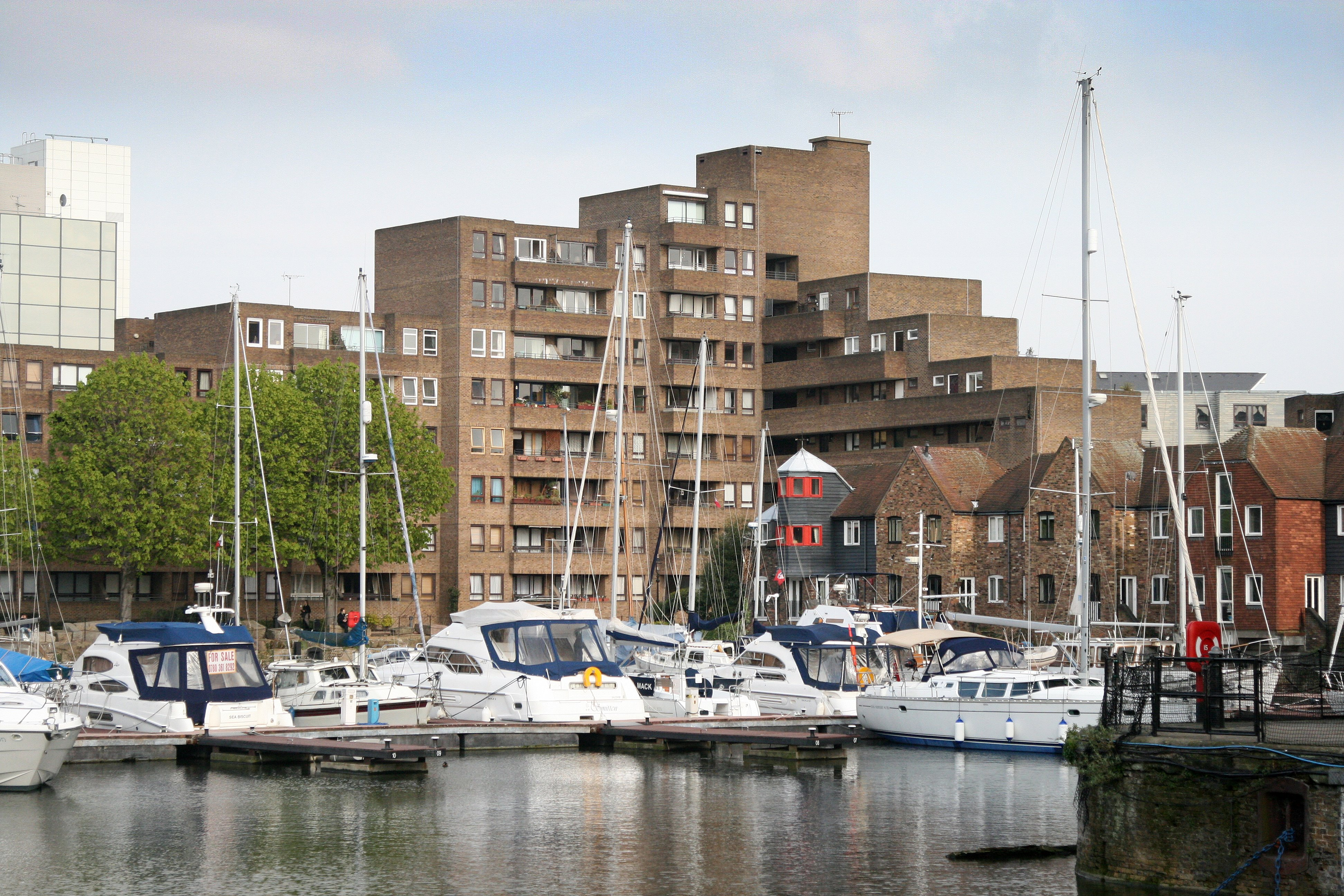
South Quay Estate - Looking east across the St Katharine Docks Marina

South Quay Estate is a mid-rise residential development of around 300 properties adjoining St Katharine Docks in Wapping located in the London Borough of Tower Hamlets. The Estate was built by the Greater London Council as a form of social housing, with the first residents moving in between 1979 and 1981. South Quay Estate includes the Burr Close, Nightingale House, St Anthony's Close and St Katharine's Way developments.

== History ==
Like many of the other strategically important London Docks, St Katharine Docks were targeted by the German Luftwaffe during World War II and suffered severe damage as a result. During the "Black Saturday" raid of 7 September 1940 - officially the first day of the Blitz - the original warehouses that surrounded the Eastern Basin of the Dock were razed to the ground by German bombs. Following the war, when the Greater London Council (GLC) embarked upon their regeneration of the area, this bomb-damaged area was selected as the site for a social housing development - South Quay Estate.

The GLC (at the time Conservative run) established the development on what was called a 'higher rent' basis. This made it almost unique and meant those applying to be the first residents had to meet certain criteria found in nearly no other type of local authority housing. These included no children, no animals, employment either within the borough of Tower Hamlets or the City of London and proof of income. A chief aim appeared to be to provide a place where young City workers on lower pay could afford to live close to where they worked - presumably to resolve a specific shortage identified by City employers and politicians. The first group of residents therefore contained a particularly high proportion of what might generally be known as 'young professionals', although it also included many middle-aged and older individuals or couples.

The GLC initially blocked the launch of the Right to Buy Scheme under the Thatcher Government in South Quay Estate, although this changed around the demise of the GLC and ownership passing to Tower Hamlets London Borough Council. With Right to Buy, like many social housing initiatives close to the City of London, the composition of tenants in South Quay Estate therefore changed significantly during the 1980s and 1990s. As a result, a significant proportion of the Estate's 300 apartment units were transferred into private hands during this period. This transformation from public to private housing was completed on 15 June 2007 when, through a process of enfranchisement, a group of about 200 South Quay Estate property owners purchased the freehold for the Estate from the council for £930,750.

Although apartments in South Quay Estate have not seen the same level of property price inflation as the luxury apartments surrounding the rest of the Marina, they have benefited from their picturesque surroundings and central location. A significant number of properties are now rented out, both mid/long-term on a residential basis and short-term for tourists and holidaymakers. There is currently a healthy demand for rental properties in the Estate driven by city workers attracted by the proximity to the city, and selection of top restaurants, cafes and bars in the area.

== Architectural style and layout ==
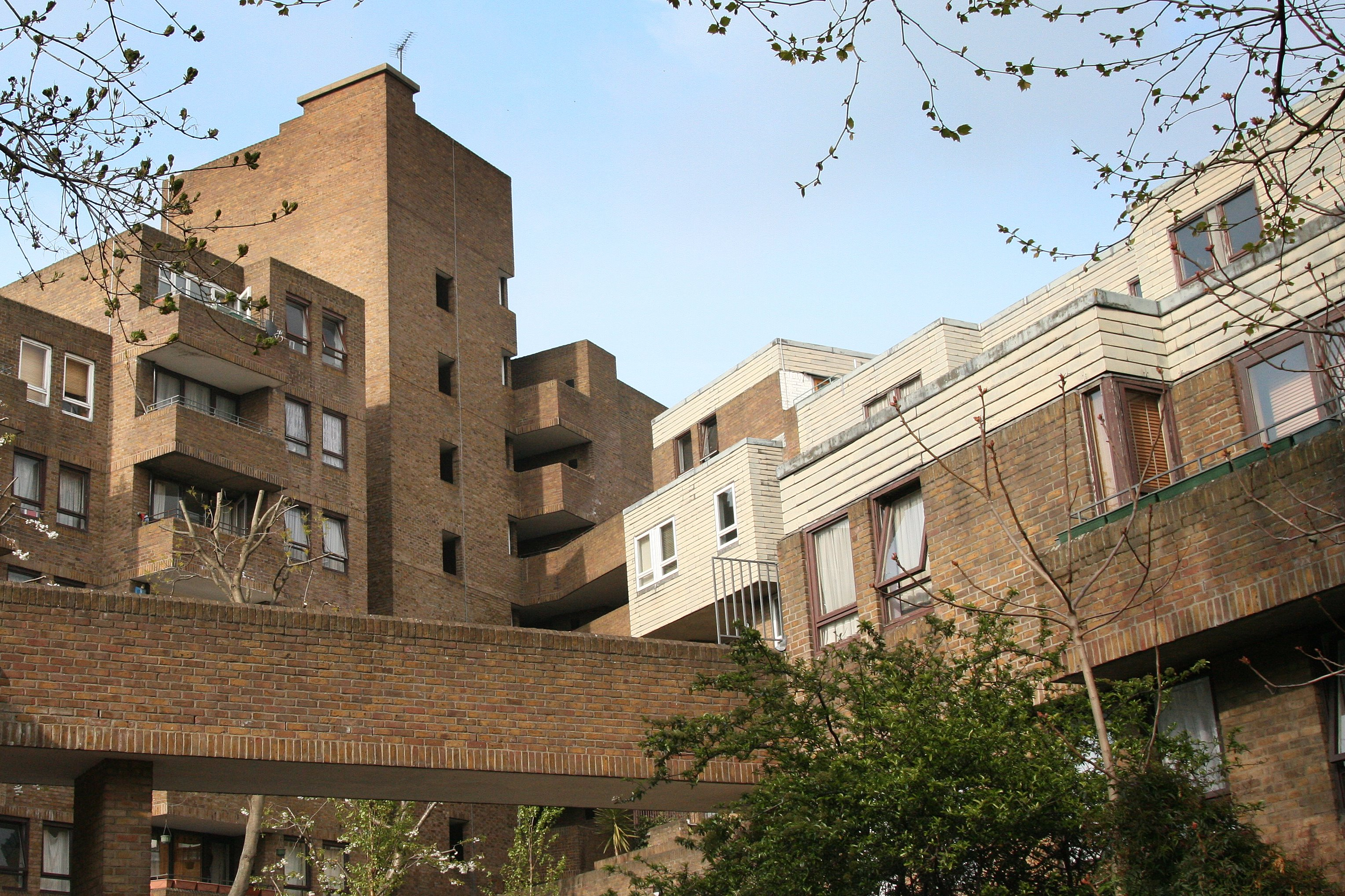
Burr Close - eastern aspect

South Quay Estate is designed in a modernist style, ranging from four to eight storeys, chiefly in dark red brick with a wood-clad effect at higher levels. Properties comprise single floor flats and duplex maisonettes of one, two and three-bedrooms. The character of the buildings are largely in keeping with those surrounding the Docks. Whilst reflecting their origin at the end of the modernist architectural period, the use of brick is in strong contrast to the concrete of high-rise, Brutalist architecture that typified social housing in post-war Britain, coupled with a wood-cladding effect popular in the late 1960s and 1970s. This also contrasts with the circles, triangles and pale colours of the postmodernist style that came to the fore from the 1980s onwards and so now seem dated compared to most later Docklands developments - such as the adjacent City Quay development of the 1990s.

Most buildings are mainly set back from the street, surrounded or separated by mature trees and other planting around the Cloysters Green and Maudlins Green spaces, as well as communal courtyards linked by a network of elevated walkways. The Docks themselves have a largely peaceful and secluded character, blocking most of the traffic noise from the busy East Smithfield artery to the north. Other roads are minor and subject to significant traffic calming, with Burr Close being split into two service-only cul-de-sacs and Mews Street controlled by security barriers at both ends. The combination of trees and water create a calming atmosphere and a connection to nature, while the mix of shops and other uses are successful in creating quiet activity. Many historic dockyard features, such as bridges and cranes, have been incorporated into structures surrounding the estate and echo the Docks' industrial heritage.

== Tower of London Conservation Area ==
A Conservation Area is defined under the Civic Amenities Act 1967 as an "area of special architectural or historic interest, the character or appearance of which it is desirable to preserve or enhance". South Quay Estate is included in the Tower of London Conservation Area, that includes numerous Grade I, Grade II and Grade II* listed buildings.

== Location ==
South Quay Estate dominates the south eastern-corner of St Katharine Docks bounded by Thomas More Street, Burr Close, St Katharine's Way and the privately maintained Mews Street. The nearest stations are Tower Hill (District and Circle lines), Tower Gateway on the DLR and Wapping (East London line), as well as Fenchurch Street station mainline terminal, each about 10–15 minutes' walk away. South Quay Estate is also served by London bus routes 15, 42, 78, 100 and RV1. The walk towards London Bridge or Tower Hill has views of landmarks such as the new City Hall, the Tower of London, Tower Bridge, and historic Tooley Street.

== Gallery ==
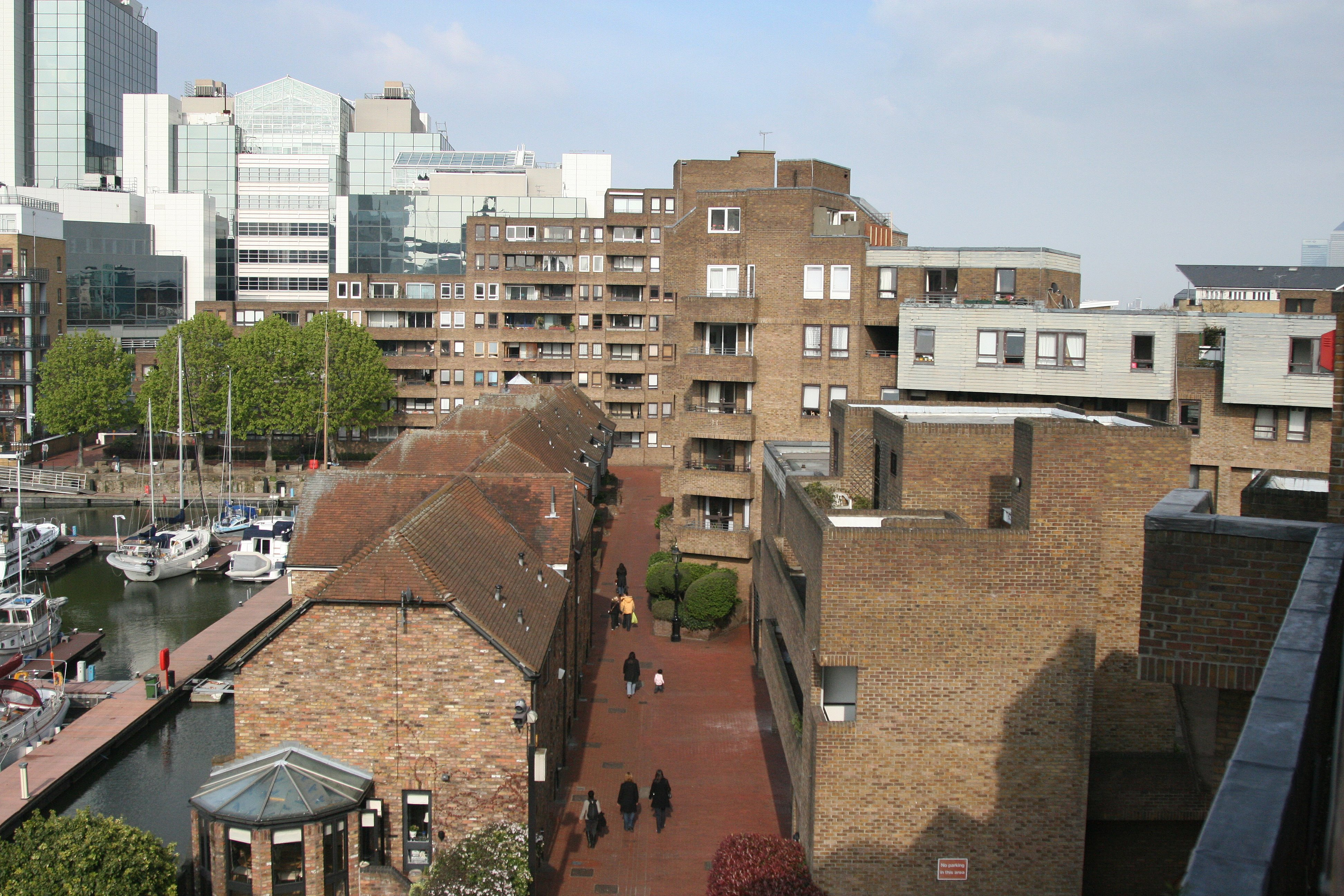
A view of South Quay Estate looking east along Mews Street

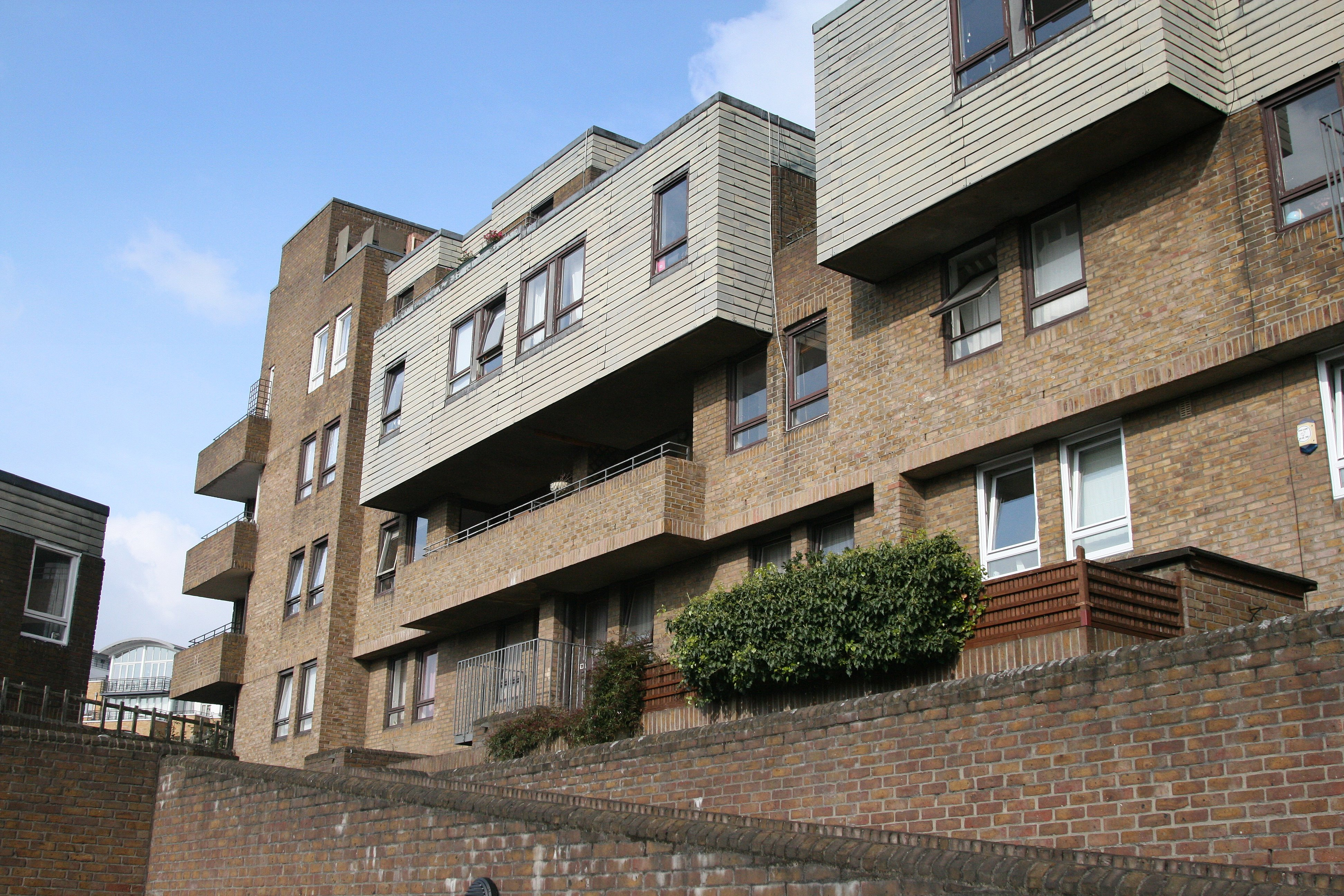
Apartments in the Burr Close development of South Quay Estate

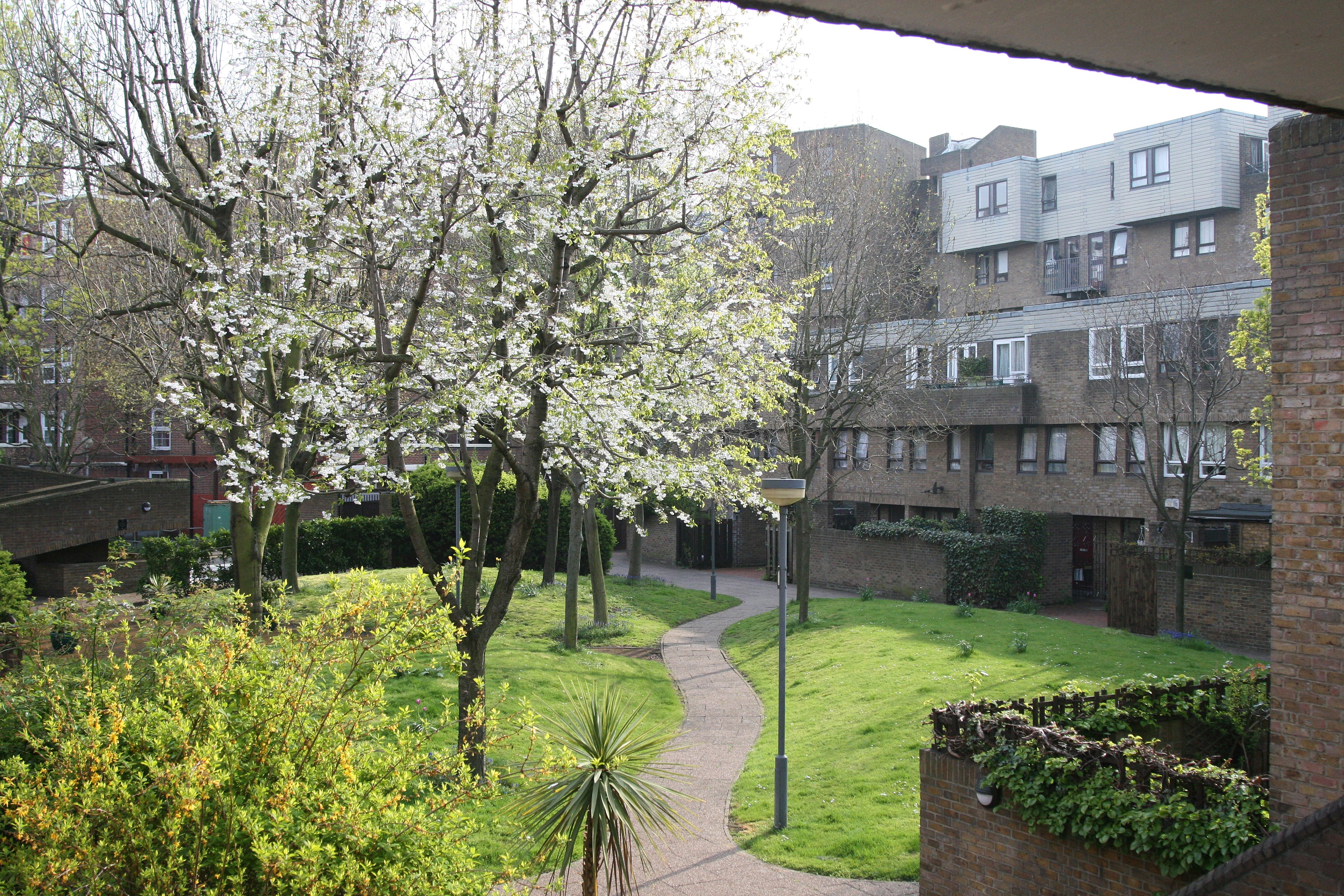
An example of one of the internal courtyards within South Quay Estate

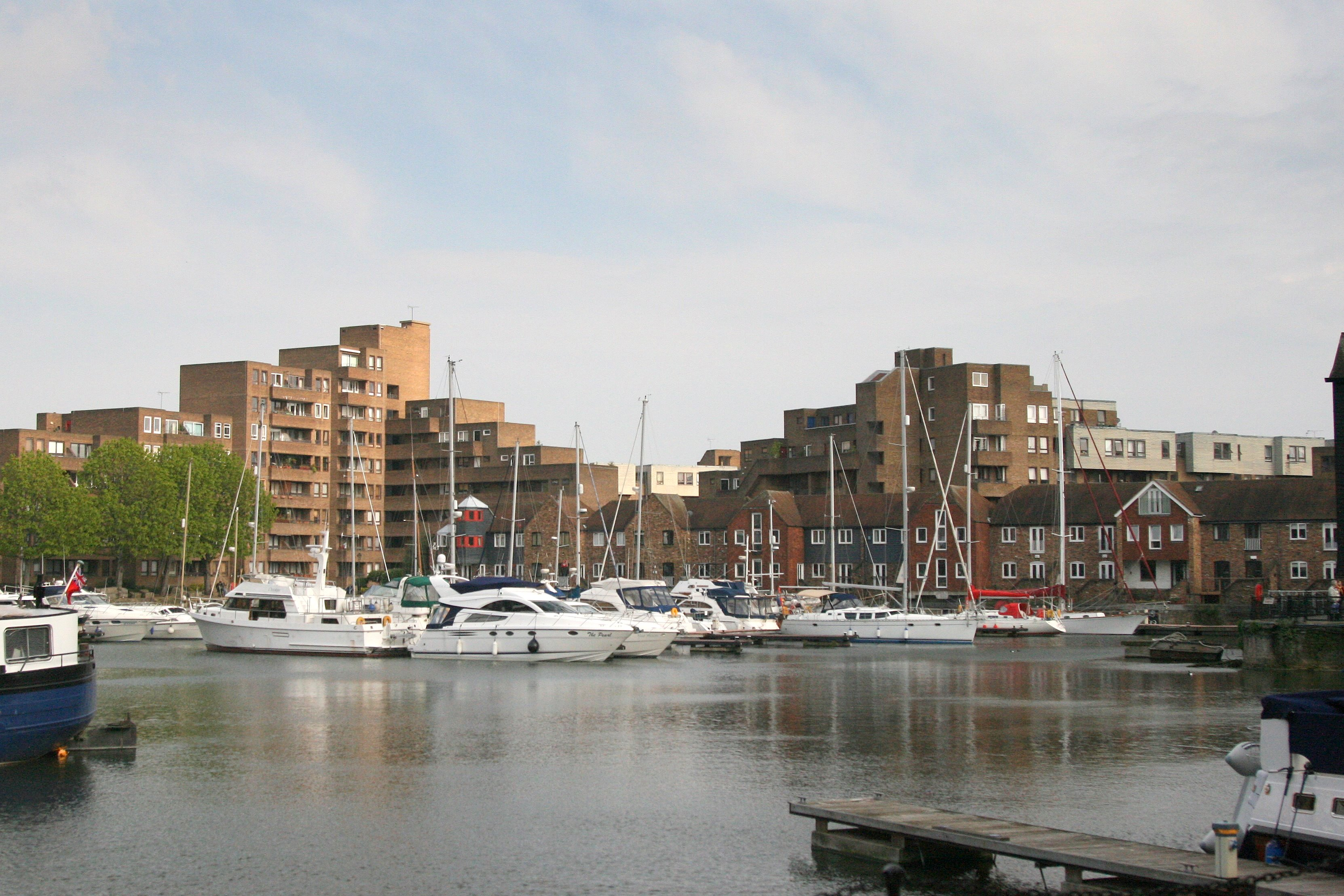
South Quay Estate across the St Katharine Docks Marina
