= South Dock =

South Dock may refer to:

- South Dock (West India Docks), formerly known as South West India Dock, Isle of Dogs, London, England
- South Dock, Rotherhithe, London, England
- South Dock, of the Swansea docks, Wales

== See also ==
- South Quay, a Docklands Light Railway (DLR) station, Isle of Dogs, London
