= St Katharine Docks =

District in central London, England

Coordinates: 51.507006°N 0.071476°W

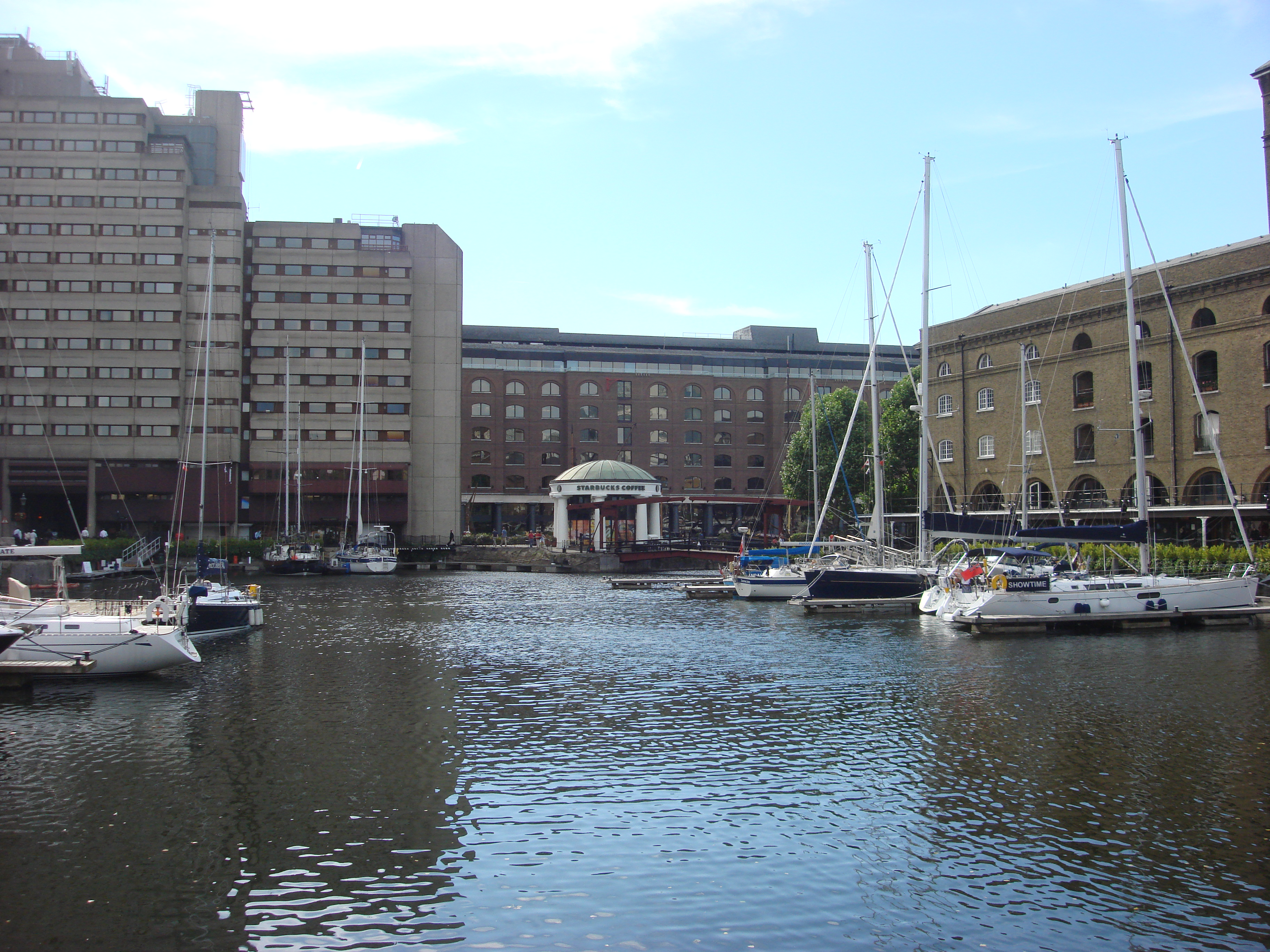
- St Katharine Docks, London

- Location within Greater London
- London borough: Tower Hamlets
- Ceremonial county: Greater London
- Region: London
- Country: England
- Sovereign state: United Kingdom
- Post town: LONDON
- Postcode district: EC3
- Dialling code: 020
- Police: Metropolitan
- Fire: London
- Ambulance: London
- London Assembly: City and East

St Katharine Docks is a former dock in the St Katharine's and Wapping electoral ward of the London Borough of Tower Hamlets. It lies in the East End on the north bank of the River Thames, immediately downstream of the Tower of London and Tower Bridge. From 1828 to 1968, it was one of the commercial docks that made up the Port of London. It is in the redevelopment zone known as the London Docklands and is now a housing and leisure complex.

== History ==
St. Katharine's Dock Act 1825
- Act of Parliament
- Parliament of the United Kingdom
- Long title: An Act for making and constructing certain Wet Docks, Warehouses, and other Works in the Parish of Saint Botolph without Aldgate and in the Parish or Precinct of Saint Katharine near the Tower of London in the County of Middlesex.
- Citation: 6 Geo. 4. c. cv
- Territorial extent: United Kingdom

Dates
- Royal assent: 10 June 1825
- Commencement: 10 June 1825 (Note: The Acts of Parliament (Commencement) Act 1793.)
- Repealed: 23 December 1920
Other legislation
Amended by	St. Katharine Dock Act 1829; St. Katharine Dock Act 1830; St. Katharine Docks Act 1832
Repealed by	Port of London (Consolidation) Act 1920

Status: Repealed

Text of statute as originally enacted

St. Katharine Dock Act 1829
- Act of Parliament
- Parliament of the United Kingdom
- Long title: An Act to amend an Act passed in the Sixth Year of the Reign of His present Majesty, intituled "An Act for making and constructing certain Wet Docks, Warehouses, and other Works, in the Parish of Saint Botolph without Aldgate, and in the Parish or Precinct of Saint Katharine near the Tower of London, in the County of Middlesex," and for extending the Powers and Provisions of the said Act.
- Citation: 10 Geo. 4. c. i
- Territorial extent: United Kingdom

Dates
- Royal assent: 23 March 1829
- Commencement: 23 March 1829
- Repealed: 1 July 1864
Other legislation
Amends	St. Katharine's Dock Act 1825
Amended by	St. Katharine Dock Act 1830; St. Katharine Docks Act 1836
Repealed by	London and Saint Katharine Docks Act 1864

Status: Repealed

Text of statute as originally enacted

St. Katharine Dock Act 1830
- Act of Parliament
- Parliament of the United Kingdom
- Long title: An Act to amend and alter two several Acts passed in the sixth and tenth years of the reign of His present Majesty, for making and constructing certain Wet Docks, Warehouses and other Works in the Parish of Saint Botolph-without-Aldgate, and in the Parish or Precinct of Saint Katharine, near the Tower of London, in the County of Middlesex, and for enlarging and extending the Powers and Provisions of the said Acts.
- Citation: 11 Geo. 4 & 1 Will. 4. c. xiii
- Territorial extent: United Kingdom

Dates
- Royal assent: 8 April 1830
- Commencement: 8 April 1830
- Repealed: 23 December 1920
Other legislation
Amends	St. Katharine's Dock Act 1825; St. Katharine Dock Act 1829
Repealed by	Port of London (Consolidation) Act 1920

Status: Repealed

Text of statute as originally enacted

St. Katharine Docks Act 1832
- Act of Parliament
- Parliament of the United Kingdom
- Long title: An Act to alter, amend, and enlarge the Powers of several Acts for making and maintaining the Saint Katharine Docks in the County of Middlesex.
- Citation: 2 & 3 Will. 4. c. xlix
- Territorial extent: United Kingdom

Dates
- Royal assent: 23 May 1832
- Commencement: 23 May 1832
- Repealed: 1 July 1864
Other legislation
Amends	St. Katharine's Dock Act 1825
Repealed by	London and St. Katharine Docks Act 1864

Status: Repealed

Text of statute as originally enacted

St. Katharine Docks Act 1836
- Act of Parliament
- Parliament of the United Kingdom
- Long title: An Act to enlarge the Powers of the several Acts passed for making and maintaining the Saint Katharine Docks in the County of Middlesex.
- Citation: 6 & 7 Will. 4. c. xxxi
- Territorial extent: United Kingdom

Dates
- Royal assent: 19 May 1836
- Commencement: 19 May 1836
- Repealed: 23 December 1920
Other legislation
Amends	St. Katharine Dock Act 1829
Repealed by	Port of London (Consolidation) Act 1920

Status: Repealed

Text of statute as originally enacted

St Katharine Docks took their name from the former hospital of St Katharine's by the Tower, built in the 12th century, which stood on the site. An intensely built-up area, the entire 23-acre (9.5 hectares) Precinct of St Katharine by the Tower and part of East Smithfield, was earmarked for redevelopment by an act of Parliament, the St. Katharine's Dock Act 1825 (6 Geo. 4. c. cv), which incorporated the Saint Katharine Dock Company, with construction commencing in May 1827. Some 1,250 houses were demolished, together with the medieval hospital of St. Katharine. Around 11,300 inhabitants, mostly port workers crammed into unsanitary slums, lost their homes; only the property owners received compensation. The scheme was designed by engineer Thomas Telford and was his only major project in London. George Turnbull and James Waylen were working for Telford. To create as much quayside as possible, the docks were designed in the form of two linked basins (East and West), both accessed via an entrance lock from the Thames. Steam engines designed by James Watt and Matthew Boulton kept the water level in the basins about four feet above that of the tidal river. By 1830, the docks had cost over £2 million to build.

The surrounding warehouses, placed close to the quayside so that goods could be unloaded directly into them, were designed by the architect Philip Hardwick.

The docks were officially opened on 25 October 1828. Although well used, they were not a great commercial success and were unable to accommodate large ships. They were amalgamated by the London and Saint Katharine Docks Act 1864 (27 & 28 Vict. c. clxxviii) with the neighbouring London Docks to form the London and Saint Katharine Docks Company. In 1909, the Port of London Authority took over the management of almost all of the Thames docks, including St Katharine Dock. By the 1930s the only regular use was by ships of the General Steam Navigation Company.

St Katharine Docks were badly damaged by German bombing during the Second World War. All the warehouses around the eastern basin were destroyed, and the site they had occupied remained derelict until the 1960s. The dock entrance lock was rebuilt in 1957 but the docks ceased commercial use in 1968. The remaining warehouses on the western side were demolished to make way for redevelopment.

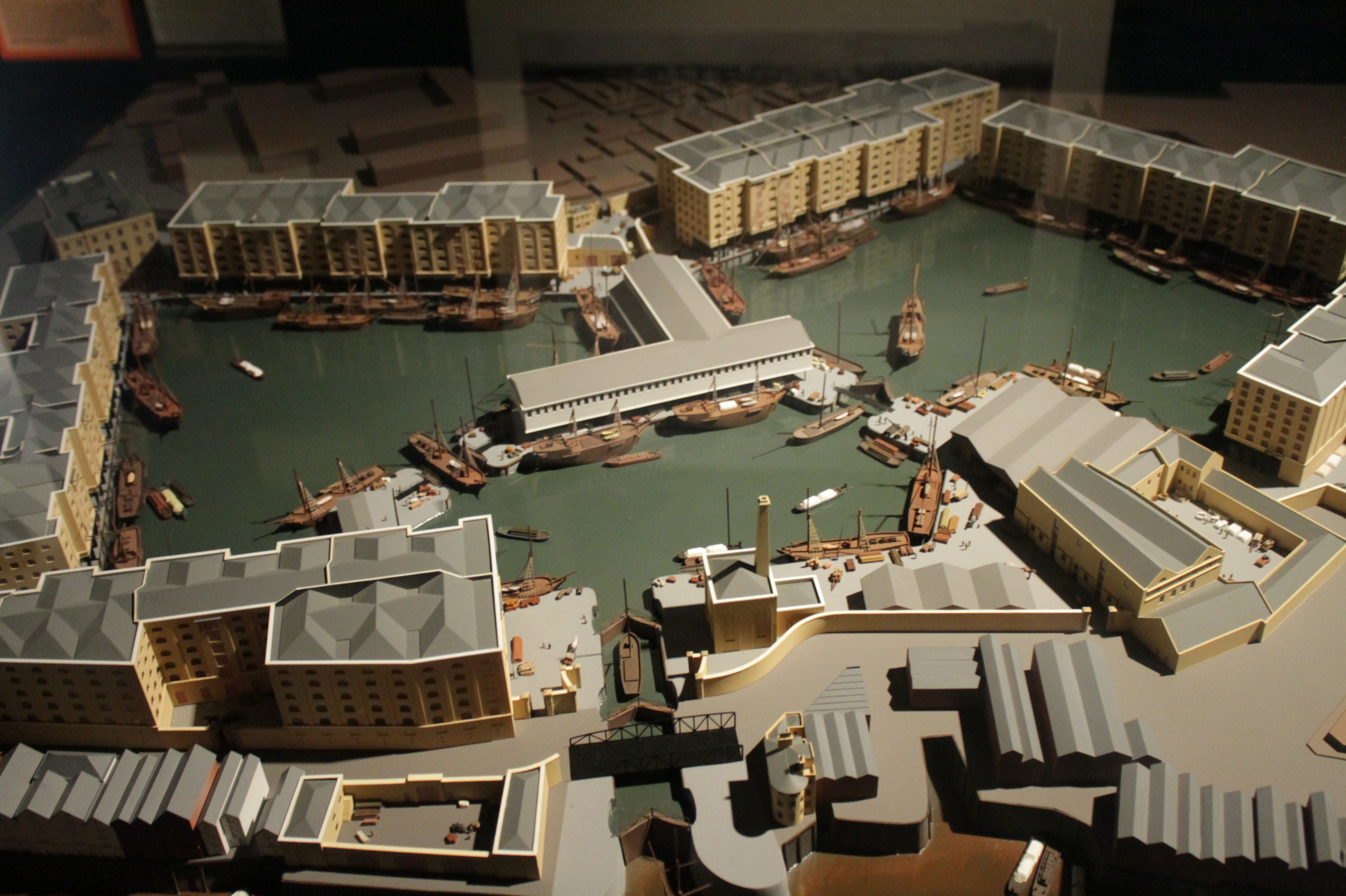
Early model of St Katharine Docks

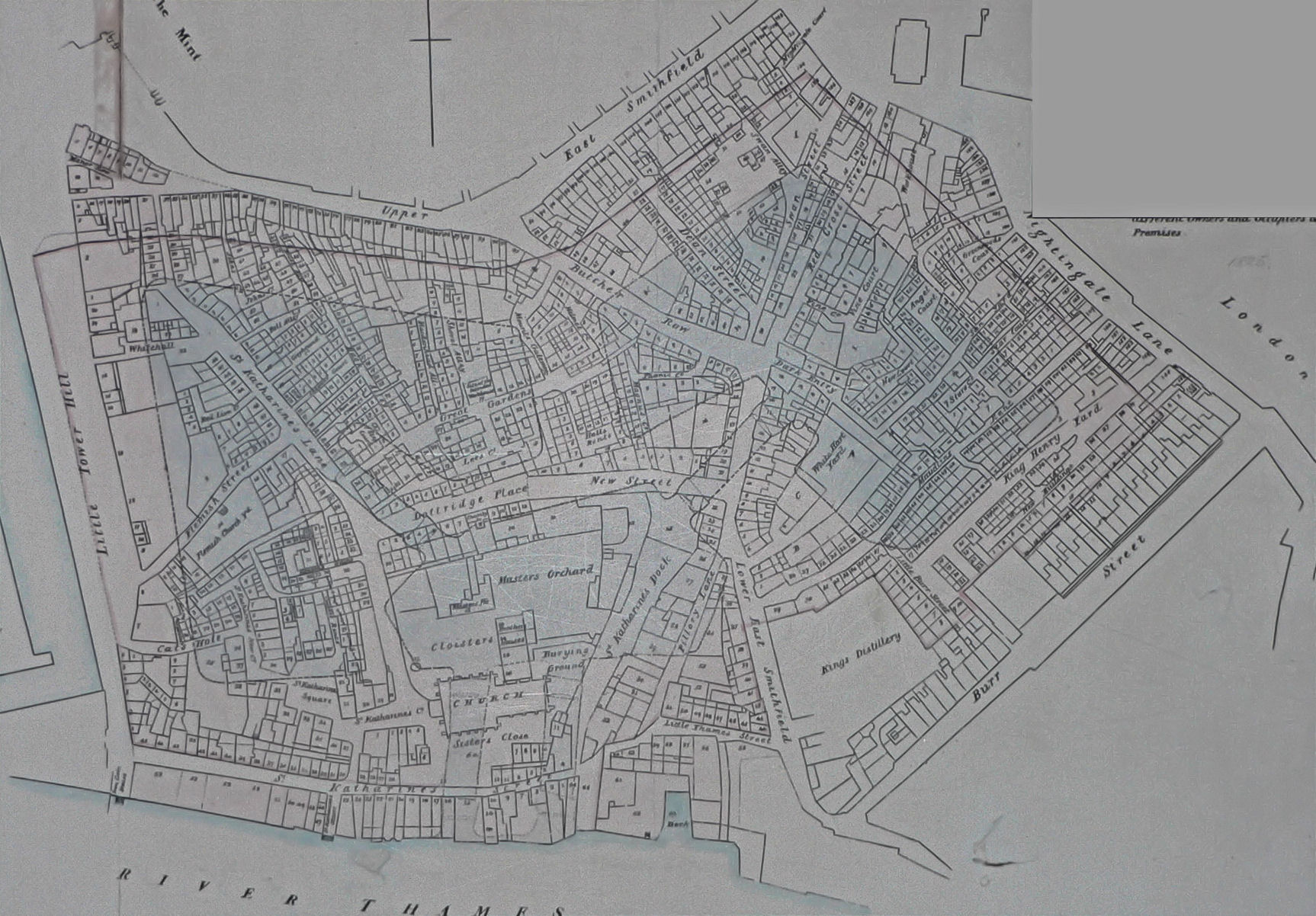
Plan drawn up for the St Katharine Dock Company showing the street and buildings which would need to be demolished to make way for the new dock

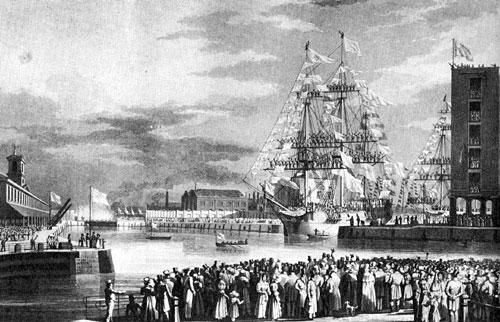
Opening of St Katharine Docks, 25 October 1828

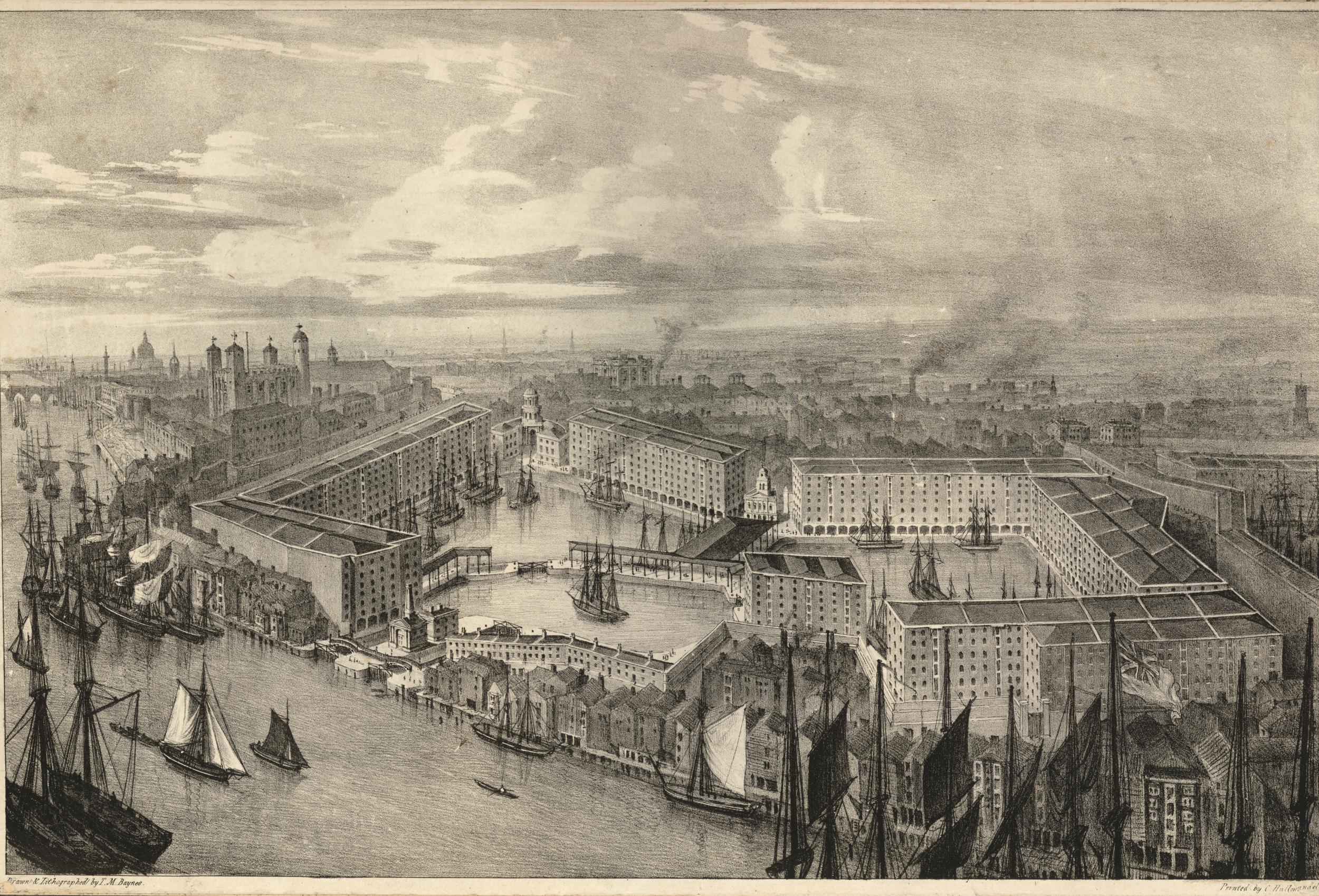
Bird's-eye view, 1829

== Closure and redevelopment ==
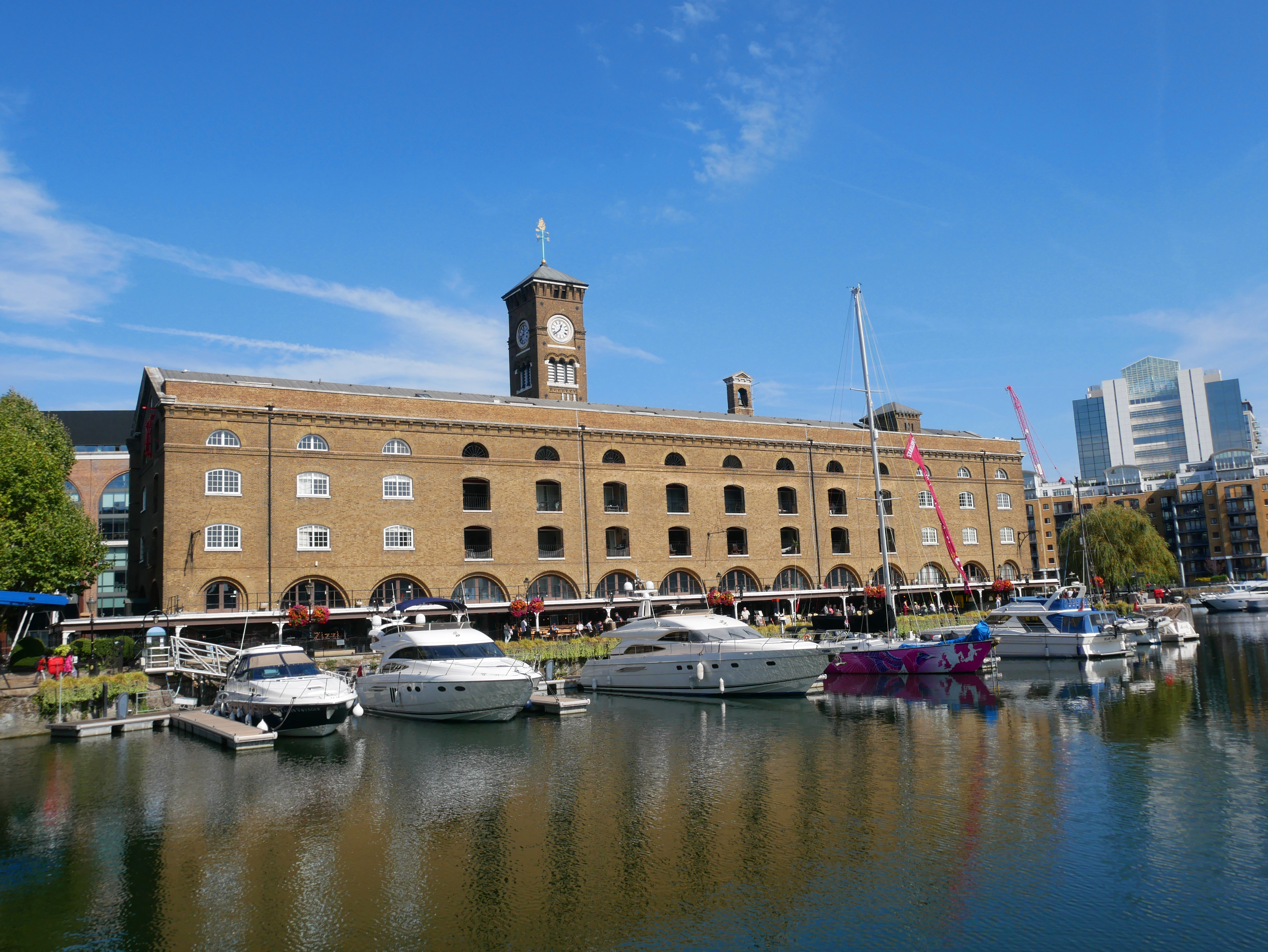
Ivory House, a 19th-century structure in St Katharine Docks

Because of their very restricted capacity and inability to cope with large modern ships, the St Katharine Docks were among the first to be closed in 1968, and were sold to the Greater London Council. The site was leased to the developers Taylor Woodrow and most of the original warehouses around the western basin were demolished and replaced by modern commercial buildings in the early 1970s, beginning with the bulky Tower Hotel (designed by Renton Howard Wood Partnership; opened in September 1973) on a site parallel to the river just to the east of Tower Bridge. This was followed by the World Trade Centre Building and Commodity Quay (both designed by architects Watkins Gray International). Development around the eastern basin was completed in the 1990s; the docks themselves becoming a marina. The development has often been cited as a model example of successful urban redevelopment.

In 1980, a plan was approved to open a St Katharine Docks Underground station on the proposed extension of the Jubilee line. It would have been between Fenchurch Street and Wapping. An eastwards extension was eventually built as part of the Jubilee line, but took a different route south of the Thames. The closest stations to the Docks today are Tower Hill (tube) and Tower Gateway DLR station, both roughly equidistant from the north-west corner of the Docks.

Between 2005 and 2008, the former Danish lightship "Lightship X" (Ten) was moored on the west dock, and used as a restaurant, before returning to Denmark.

The marina, including restaurants and offices, was owned by Max Property Group, operated by investor Nick Leslau, since 2011, and was sold to Blackstone Group in 2014. Over the next three years, Blackstone completed a major restoration. In May 2017, the company retained agents to find potential buyers for the complex; the listing price was £435m. In October 2017, however, Blackstone withdrew the property from the market because bids were below the asking price.

== The docks today ==
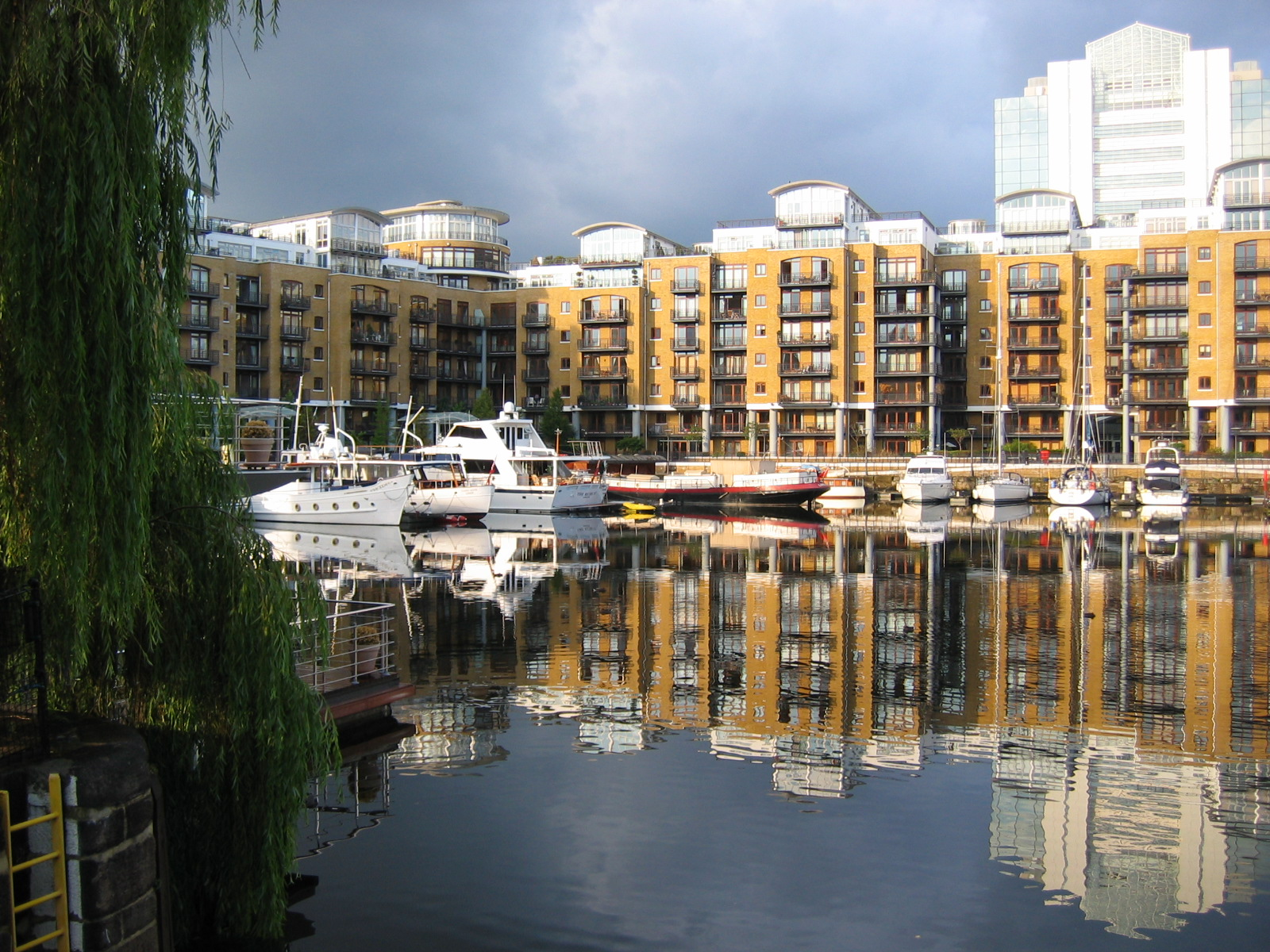
Boats moored in St Katharine Docks

The former docks now features offices, public and private housing, a large hotel, shops and restaurants, a pub (The Dickens Inn, a former brewery dating back to the 18th century), a yachting marina and other recreational facilities. The east dock is now dominated by the City Quay residential development, comprising more than 200 privately owned flats overlooking the marina. The south side of the east dock is surrounded by the South Quay Estate which was originally social housing.

The anchor from the wreck of the Dutch East Indiaman Amsterdam is on display at the entrance to the east dock.

== Notable boats ==
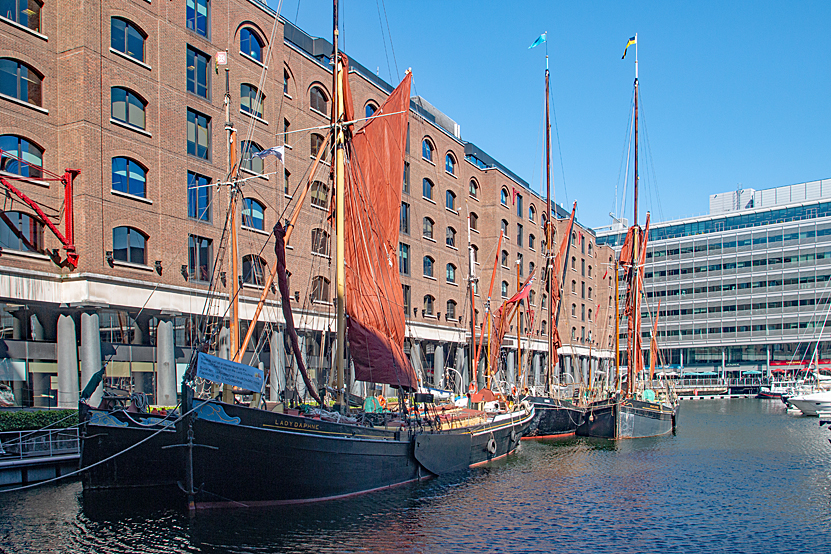
Thames sailing barges at St Katharine Docks

Notable boats regularly moored in the docks include:

- Gloriana, royal barge
- MV Havengore, former Port of London Authority hydrographic survey vessel

Several Thames sailing barges are also based in the docks.

- Adieu
- Marjorie

== Notable residents ==
- David Mellor, broadcaster and former politician, and Penelope, Viscountess Cobham
- David Suchet, actor
- Sir Michael Hodgkinson, business man

== In media ==
The docks were used as one of the main filming locations for the Hammer Film Productions version of Dennis Wheatley's novel To The Devil - A Daughter in 1976, with the character played by Richard Widmark living in one of the residential flats. Scenes featured the Ivory House and the retractable bridge.

In April 2021, it was filmed for Men, a folk horror film directed by Alex Garland and starring Jessie Buckley, released in 2022. It was used for Buckley's character's apartment with her abusive husband, and also where he died.

The inner gatefold photograph for The Rolling Stones album Through the Past Darkly (Big Hits Vol. 2) was taken at St Katharine Docks by Ethan Russell in May 1969.

The docks were also used as a filming location for the 1983 UK-based action film Who Dares Wins (titled "The Final Option" in the US market).

== Tower Bridge Quay ==
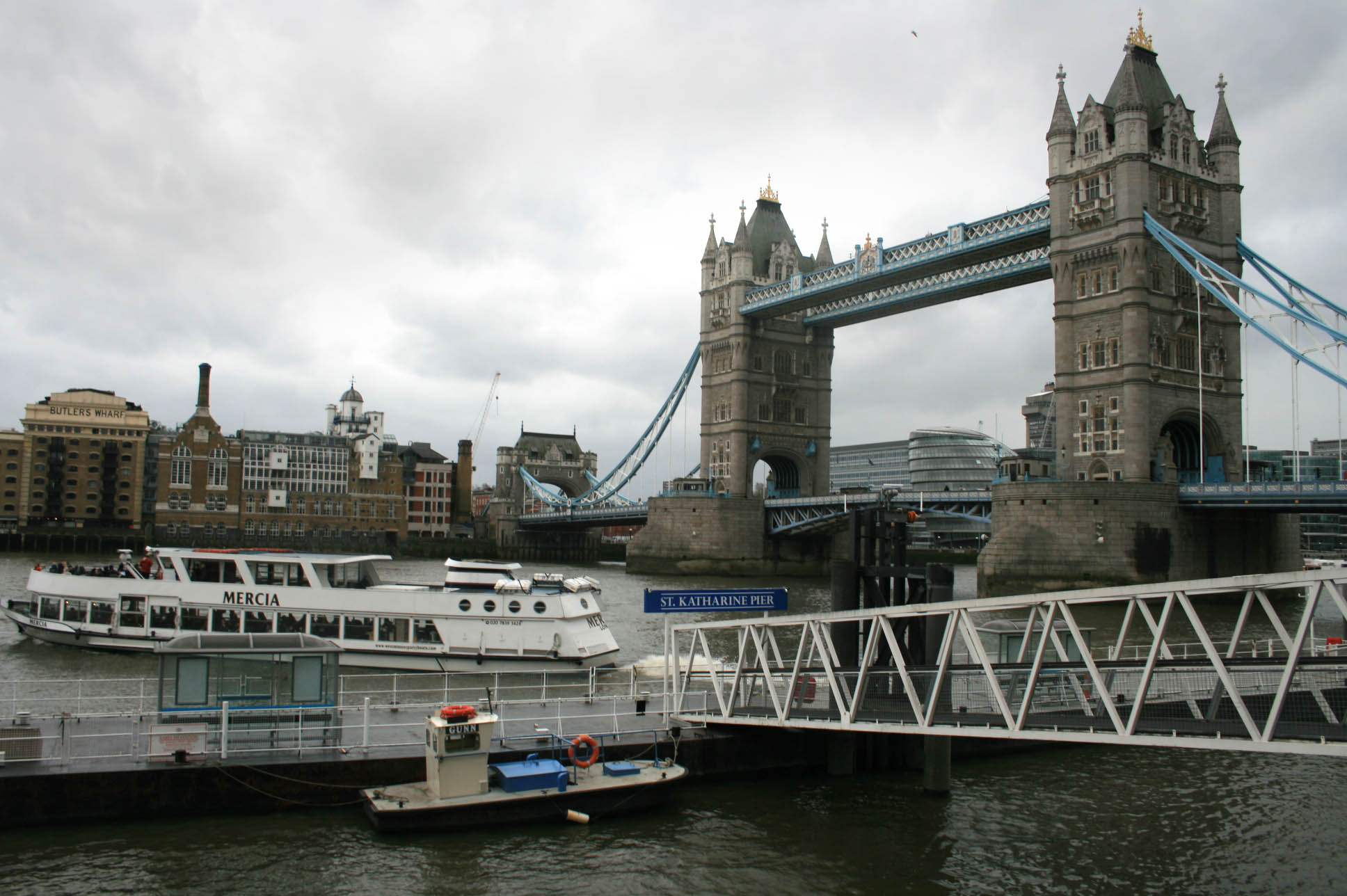
A cruise boat departs from Tower Bridge Quay

Tower Bridge Quay is close to the St Katharine Dock, providing river transport services managed by London River Services. The main service from Tower Bridge Quay is a circular river cruise operated by Crown River Cruises which goes non-stop to Westminster Millennium Pier before returning via the South Bank arts centre, as well as a Westminster-Greenwich express service run by Thames River Services.

The nearby Tower Millennium Pier, located on the other side of Tower Bridge, now provides the main commuter river boat services to Canary Wharf and Greenwich in the east and the West End in the west, and a fast visitor service to the London Eye.
