= London Docks =

Architectural structures

Coordinates: 51°30′21.6″N 0°3′37.2″W

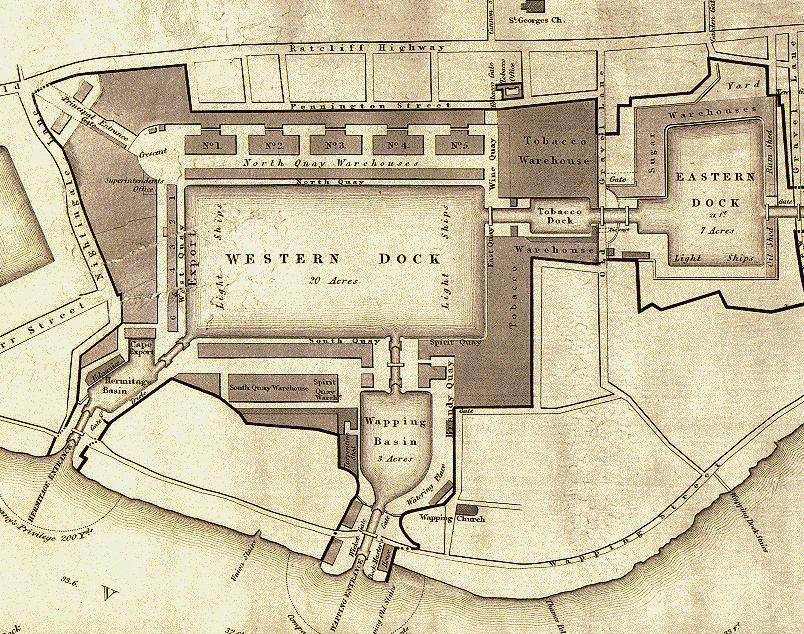
A map of the London Docks in 1831

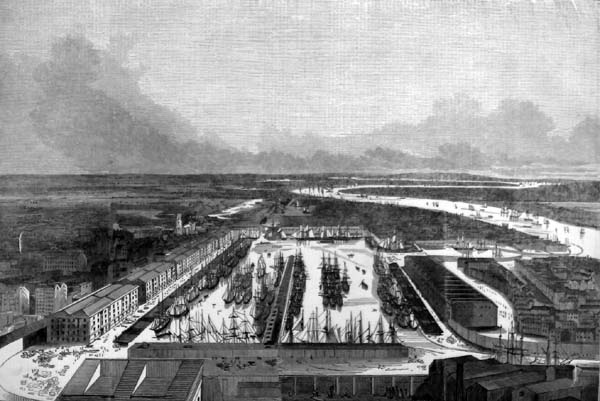
A birdseye view dated 1845

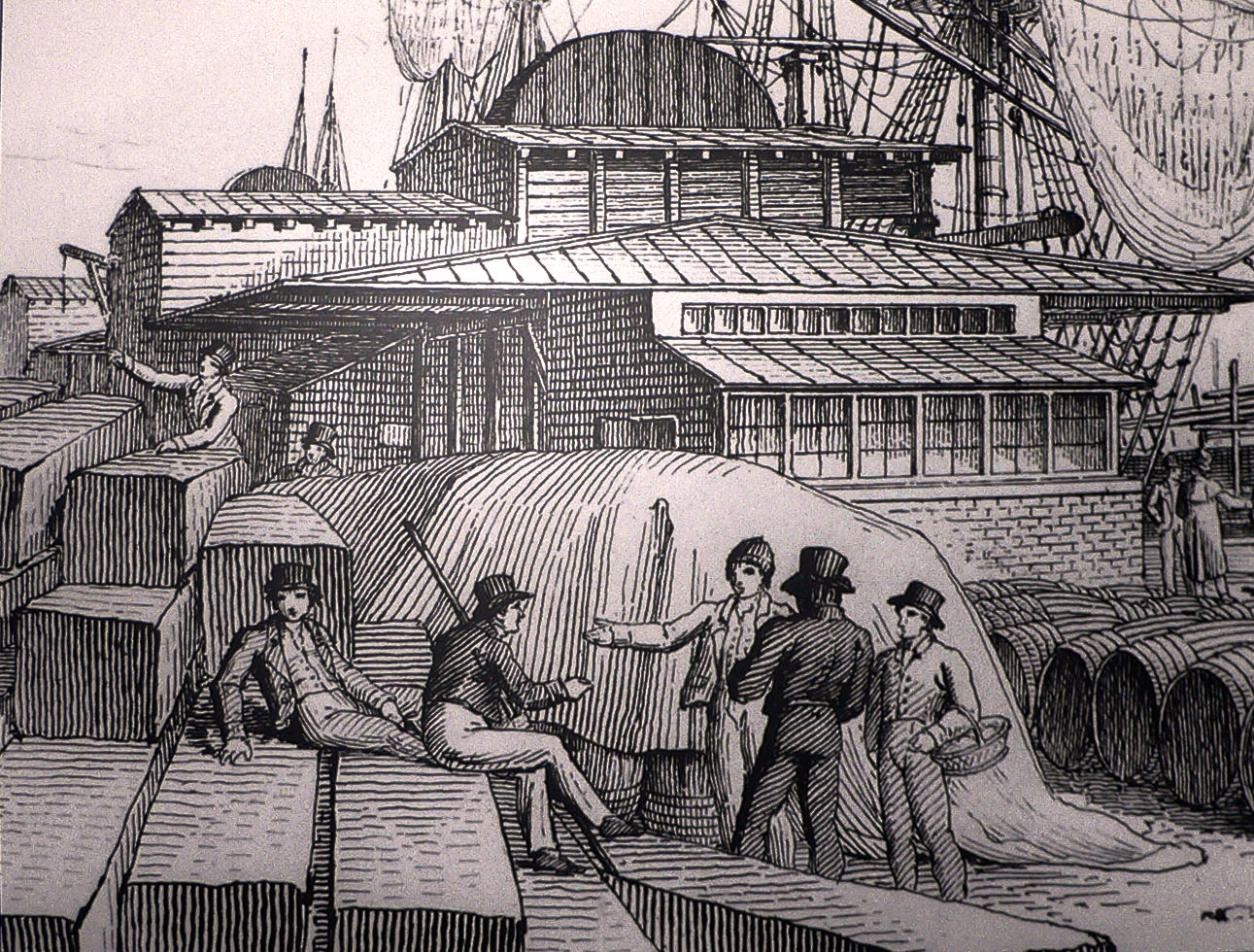
At the London Dock in the 1820s, the Customs employed around 250 men and the Excise around 200.

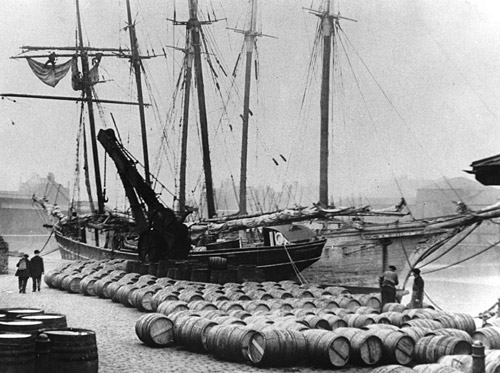
Port wine from Porto being unloaded on a London Docks quayside, c. 1909

The London Docks were one of several sets of docks in the historic Port of London.

They were constructed in Wapping, downstream from the City of London between 1799 and 1815, at a cost exceeding £5½ million.

Traditionally ships had docked at wharves on the River Thames, but by the late 1700s more capacity was needed. They were the closest docks to the City of London until St Katharine Docks were built two decades later.

== London Dock Company ==
Port of London Improvement Act 1800
- Act of Parliament
- Parliament of Great Britain
- Long title: An Act for making Wet Docks, Basons, Cuts, and other Works, for the greater Accommodation and Security of Shipping, Commerce, and Revenue, within the Port of London.
- Citation: 39 & 40 Geo. 3. c. xlvii
- Territorial extent: Great Britain

Dates
- Royal assent: 20 June 1800
- Commencement: 20 June 1800 (Note: The Acts of Parliament (Commencement) Act 1793.)
- Repealed: 5 November 1993
Other legislation
| Amended by | Port of London Improvement Act 1805; Port of London Improvement and London Dock Company Act 1806 |
| Repealed by | Statute Law (Repeals) Act 1993 |

Status: Repealed

Text of statute as originally enacted

London Docks (Warehousing of Goods) Act 1804
- Act of Parliament
- Parliament of the United Kingdom
- Long title: An act for warehousing Goods within the Limits of certain Docks made under an Act, passed in the thirty-ninth and fortieth Year of his present Majesty, intituled, "An act for making Wet Docks, Basons, Cuts, and other Works for the greater Accommodation and Security of Shipping, Commerce, and Revenue within the Port of London;" and to make Regulations relating to the said Docks.
- Citation: 44 Geo. 3. c. 100
- Territorial extent: United Kingdom

Dates
- Royal assent: 28 July 1804
- Commencement: 28 July 1804
- Repealed: 15 July 1828
Other legislation
| Amends | Port of London Improvement Act 1800 |
| Repealed by | London Docks Act 1828 |

Status: Repealed

Text of statute as originally enacted

Port of London Improvement and London Dock Company Act 1806
- Act of Parliament
- Parliament of the United Kingdom
- Long title: An Act to alter and amend several Acts, passed in the Fortieth, Forty fourth, and Forty fifth Years of His present Majesty, for making Wet Docks, Basons, Cuts and other Works, for the greater Accommodation and Security of Shipping, Commerce and Revenue, within the Port of London; and for other the Purposes in the said Acts mentioned; and for enlarging the Powers thereby granted to the London Dock Company.
- Citation: 46 Geo. 3. c. lix
- Territorial extent: United Kingdom

Dates
- Royal assent: 9 June 1806
- Commencement: 9 June 1806
- Repealed: 15 July 1828
Other legislation
| Amends | Port of London Improvement Act 1800; London Docks (Warehousing of Goods) Act 1804; Port of London Improvement Act 1805 |
| Repealed by | London Docks Act 1828 |

Status: Repealed

Text of statute as originally enacted

London Dock Company Act 1807
- Act of Parliament
- Parliament of the United Kingdom
- Long title: An Act to enable the London Dock Company to purchase certain Water Works in the Parishes of Stratford, Westham, Bow, Bromley, Mile End, and Stepney, and other Parishes adjacent; and to amend the several Acts for making Wet Docks and other Works for the Accommodation of Shipping, Commerce, and Revenue, within the Port of London.
- Citation: 47 Geo. 3 Sess. 2. c. v
- Territorial extent: United Kingdom

Dates
- Royal assent: 25 July 1807
- Commencement: 25 July 1807
- Repealed: 15 July 1828
Other legislation
| Repealed by | London Docks Act 1828 |

Status: Repealed

London Dock Company Act 1809
- Act of Parliament
- Parliament of the United Kingdom
- Long title: An Act to alter and amend several Acts passed in the Fortieth, Forty-fourth, Forty-fifth, Forty-sixth, and Forty-seventh Years of His present Majesty, for making Wet Docks, Basons, Cuts, and other Works, for the greater Accommodation and Security of Shipping, Commerce, and Revenue, within the Port of London, and for other the Purposes therein mentioned relating thereto, and to enlarge the Powers and Authorities by the said Acts granted to the London Dock Company.
- Citation: 49 Geo. 3. c. clvi
- Territorial extent: United Kingdom

Dates
- Royal assent: 10 June 1809
- Commencement: 10 June 1809
- Repealed: 15 July 1828
Other legislation
| Repealed by | London Docks Act 1828 |

Status: Repealed

London Dock Company's Rates (Wines and Spirits) Act 1811
- Act of Parliament
- Parliament of the United Kingdom
- Long title: An Act for regulating the Rates and Charges to be received by the London Dock Company, upon Wines and Spirits landed and warehoused in the London Docks.
- Citation: 51 Geo. 3. c. xlix
- Territorial extent: United Kingdom

Dates
- Royal assent: 6 May 1811
- Commencement: 6 May 1811
- Repealed: 15 July 1828
Other legislation
| Repealed by | London Docks Act 1828 |

Status: Unknown

Text of statute as originally enacted

London Docks Act 1812
- Act of Parliament
- Parliament of the United Kingdom
- Long title: An Act for allowing further Time for the Completion of the Docks, Entrances and other Works and Buildings, belonging to the London Dock Company.
- Citation: 52 Geo. 3. c. cxiv
- Territorial extent: United Kingdom

Dates
- Royal assent: 20 May 1812
- Commencement: 20 May 1812
- Repealed: 15 July 1828
Other legislation
| Amended by | London Docks Act 1814 |
| Repealed by | London Docks Act 1828 |

Status: Repealed

Text of statute as originally enacted

London Docks Act 1814
- Act of Parliament
- Parliament of the United Kingdom
- Long title: An Act for enlarging and amending the Powers and Provisions of the several Acts for making the London Docks.
- Citation: 54 Geo. 3. c. xl
- Territorial extent: United Kingdom

Dates
- Royal assent: 18 May 1814
- Commencement: 18 May 1814
- Repealed: 15 July 1828
Other legislation
| Amends | London Docks Act 1812 |
| Repealed by | London Docks Act 1828 |

Status: Repealed

Text of statute as originally enacted

London Dock Company Act 1823
- Act of Parliament
- Parliament of the United Kingdom
- Long title: An Act to allow further Time for the Completion of the Docks and other Works belonging to the London Dock Company.
- Citation: 4 Geo. 4. c. cxxiv
- Territorial extent: United Kingdom

Dates
- Royal assent: 10 July 1823
- Commencement: 10 July 1823
- Repealed: 15 July 1828
Other legislation
| Repealed by | London Docks Act 1828 |

Status: Repealed

Text of statute as originally enacted

London Docks Act 1853 (Note: Section 1.)
- Act of Parliament
- Parliament of the United Kingdom
- Long title: An Act to authorize the London Dock Company to make a new Entrance to their Docks from the River Thames and other Works, and to augment their Capital Stock; and for other Purposes connected with the said Docks.
- Citation: 16 & 17 Vict. c. cvi
- Territorial extent: United Kingdom

Dates
- Royal assent: 4 August 1853
- Commencement: 4 August 1853
- Repealed: 1 July 1864
Other legislation
| Amends | London Docks Act 1828 |
| Repealed by | London and Saint Katharine Docks Act 1864 |

Status: Repealed

Text of statute as originally enacted

London Docks Act 1856
- Act of Parliament
- Parliament of the United Kingdom
- Long title: An Act to enable the London Dock Company to raise a further Sum of Money.
- Citation: 19 & 20 Vict. c. i
- Territorial extent: United Kingdom

Dates
- Royal assent: 29 April 1856
- Commencement: 29 April 1856
- Repealed: 1 July 1864
Other legislation
| Repealed by | London and Saint Katharine Docks Act 1864 |

Status: Repealed

Text of statute as originally enacted

London Docks Act 1858
- Act of Parliament
- Parliament of the United Kingdom
- Long title: An Act to enable the London Dock Company to raise a further Sum of Money, and to augment their Capital Stock; and for other Purposes connected with their Docks.
- Citation: 21 & 22 Vict. c. xxxv
- Territorial extent: United Kingdom

Dates
- Royal assent: 14 June 1858
- Commencement: 14 June 1858
- Repealed: 1 July 1864
Other legislation
| Repealed by | London and Saint Katharine Docks Act 1864 |

Status: Repealed

The London Dock Company was formed by the Port of London Improvement Act 1800 (39 & 40 Geo. 3. c. xlvii), and work on the docks began in 1801. They were amalgamated with St Katharine Docks to form the London and Saint Katharine Docks Company by the London and Saint Katharine Docks Act 1864 (27 & 28 Vict. c. clxxviii).

== Physical description ==
The London Docks occupied a total area of about 30 acres (120,000 m^{2}), consisting of Western and Eastern docks linked by the short Tobacco Dock. The Western Dock was connected to the Thames by Hermitage Basin to the south west and Wapping Basin to the south.

The Eastern Dock connected to the Thames via the Shadwell Basin to the east. The principal designers were the architects and engineers Daniel Asher Alexander and John Rennie.

The docks specialised in high-value luxury commodities such as ivory, spices, coffee and cocoa as well as wine and wool, for which elegant warehouses and wine cellars were constructed. The docks were served by rail at East Smithfield Station, opened in 1864 by London and Blackwall Railway and remained in use until September 1966. The Port of London Authority took over the London Docks together with the rest of the enclosed docks in 1909.

== After containerisation of commercial shipping ==
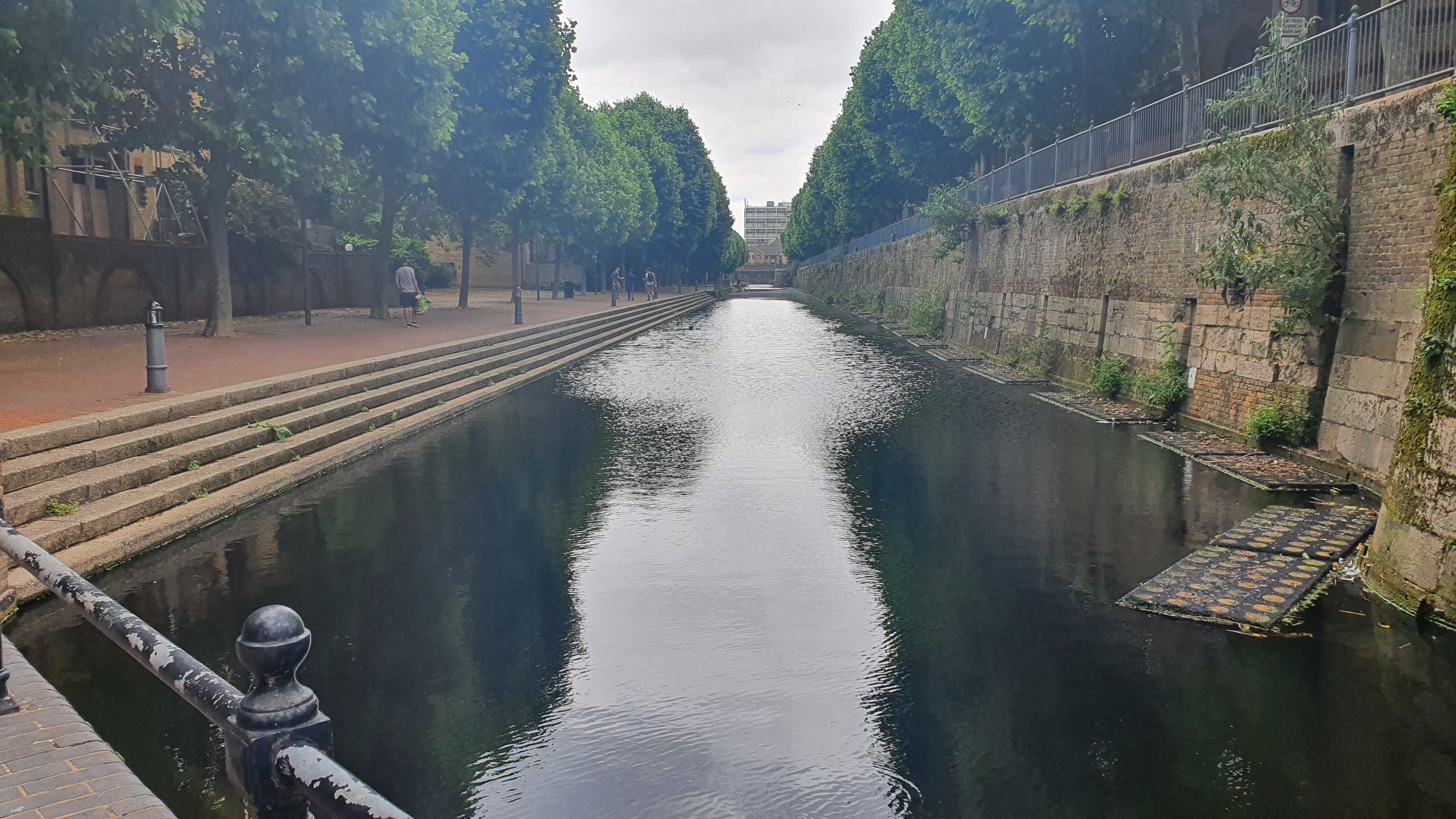
Spirit Quay in Wapping – a canal remnant of the London Docks

The docks were closed to shipping in 1969 and sold to the borough of Tower Hamlets. The western portion of the London Docks was filled in with the (unrealised) intention of turning them into public housing estates. The land was still largely derelict when it was acquired in 1981 by the London Docklands Development Corporation (LDDC). It was subsequently redeveloped with over 1,000 individual properties centred on the old Tobacco Dock and Shadwell Basin.

The controversial "Fortress Wapping" printing works of Rupert Murdoch's News International corporation was constructed on the northern half of the infilled Western Dock. Hermitage Basin and Shadwell Basin survive. Wapping Basin is now a sports pitch and some of the Eastern Dock site is open space. A small canal runs across the southern part of the Western Dock site from Hermitage Basin to Tobacco Dock.

== See also ==
- Safeguarded wharf
