= East India Dock Act 1828 =

Act of the Parliament of the United Kingdom

- Act of Parliament
- Parliament of the United Kingdom
- Long title: An Act to consolidate and amend several Acts for the further Improvement of the Port of London, by making Docks and other Works at Blackwall for the Accommodation of East India Shipping.
- Citation: 9 Geo. 4. c. xcv
- Territorial extent: United Kingdom

Dates
- Royal assent: 19 June 1828
- Commencement: 19 June 1828 (Note: The Acts of Parliament (Commencement) Act 1793.)
Other legislation
Amends	See § Repealed enactments
Repeals/revokes	See § Repealed enactments
Amended by	East India Dock Act 1835; West and East India Dock Act 1838
Repealed by	Port of London (Consolidation) Act 1920

Status: Repealed

Text of statute as originally enacted

The East India Dock Act 1828 (9 Geo. 4. c. xcv) was a local act of the Parliament of the United Kingdom that consolidated and amended the acts relating to the East India Dock Company's docks and other works at Blackwall, in the Port of London.

== Provisions ==
=== Repealed enactments ===
Section 1 of the act repealed 3 enactments, listed in that section. The repeal did not affect the validity of any purchase, conveyance, act, matter, proceeding, or thing already made, done, executed, commenced, or instituted under the repealed acts, which remained as good, valid, and effectual as if those acts had not been repealed.

Citation	Short title	Description	Extent of repeal
43 Geo. 3. c. cxxvi	East India Docks Act 1803	An Act for the further Improvement of the Port of London, by making Docks and other Works at Blackwall for the Accommodation of the East India Shipping in the said Port.	The whole act.
46 Geo. 3. c. cxiii	East India Docks Act 1806	An Act for altering and enlarging the Powers of an Act made in the Forty-third Year of His present Majesty, for the further Improvement of the Port of London, by making Docks and other Works at Blackwall for the Accommodation of the East India Shipping in the said Port.	The whole act.
54 Geo. 3. c. ccxxviii	East India Docks (Blackwall) Act 1814	An Act for amending and enlarging the Powers of Two Acts made in the Forty-third and Forty-sixth Years of His present Majesty, for the further Improvement of the Port of London, by making Docks and other Works at Blackwall for the Accommodation of the East India Shipping in the said Port.	The whole act.

== Subsequent developments ==
The company's undertaking passed to the Port of London Authority on 31 March 1909 under the Port of London Act 1908 (8 Edw. 7. c. 68), which superseded the East and West India Dock Company, the London and St Katharine Docks Company, the Surrey Commercial Dock Company, the Millwall Dock Company, and the Thames Conservancy, among other bodies.

The whole act was repealed by section 3 of, and part I of the third schedule to, the Port of London (Consolidation) Act 1920 (10 & 11 Geo. 5. c. clxxiii), which came into force on 23 December 1920.
