= Richmond Lock and Footbridge =

Lock and pedestrian bridges in London, England

Richmond Lock
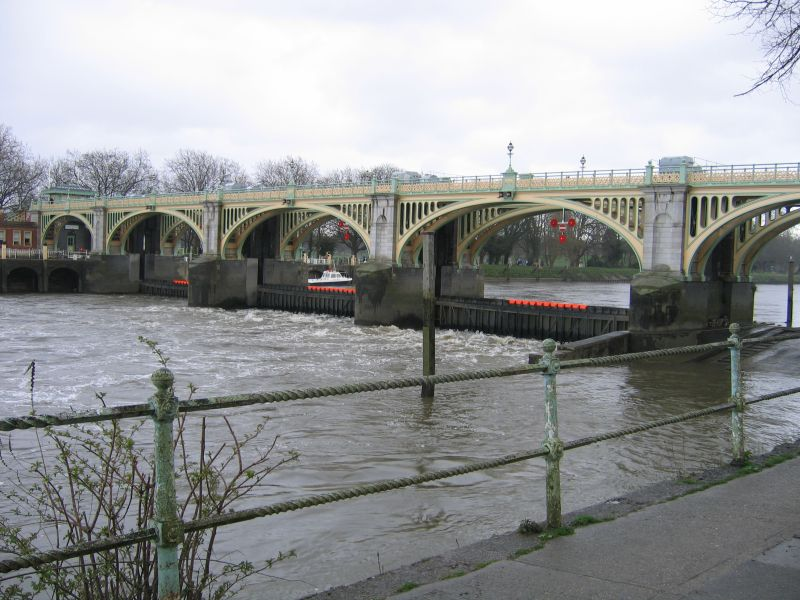
- Richmond Lock and Footbridge, viewed from near Isleworth, London
- Interactive map of Richmond Lock
- 51°27′44″N 0°19′02″W

Listed Building – Grade II*
- Official name: Richmond Footbridge, Lock and Sluices
- Designated: 25 May 1983
- Reference no.: 1250044
- Waterway: River Thames
- County: Greater London
- Maintained by: Port of London Authority
- First built: 1894
- Length: 250 feet (76.2 m)
- Width: 26 feet 8 inches (8.1 m)
- Fall: Half tide lock (10 feet (3 m))
- Above sea level: 2 feet (0.61 m) (maximal low tide below lock) to greater than 20 feet (6.1 m) (usual maximal high tide above lock)

Richmond Lock and Footbridge is a lock, rising and falling low-tide barrage integrating controlled sluices and pair of pedestrian bridges on the River Thames in southwest London, England, and is a Grade II* listed structure. It is the furthest downstream of the forty-five Thames locks and the only one owned and operated by the Port of London Authority. It was opened in 1894 and is north-west of the centre of Richmond in a semi-urban part of southwest London. Downstream are Syon Park and Kew Gardens on opposite banks. It connects the promenade at Richmond with the neighbouring district of St. Margarets on the west bank during the day and is closed at night to pedestrians – after 19:30 GMT or after 21:30 when BST is in use. At high tide the sluice gates are raised and partly hidden behind metal arches forming twin footbridges.

It was built to maintain the lowest-lying head of water of the forty-five navigable reaches of the Thames above the rest of the Tideway. Below the structure for a few miles, at low tide, the navigable channel is narrow and restricts access for vessels with the greatest draft. The next major point of mooring below the lock is, accordingly, at Brentford Dock.

== Description ==
The chief engineer who designed the core of the structure, F. G. M. Stoney, took out seven patents relating to sluices between 1873 and 1894. Hunt and Steward, surveyors, designed the lockhouses. Ransomes & Rapier of Ipswich designed the ironwork including the arches. The structure was built between 1891 and 1894.

The structures

The superstructure was built horizontally in three sections, the middle section forms the bulk and has, itself, three spans.

The lock is the first section, topped by the first of five ornate metal arches which spread over the other sections. The middle section has mechanically rising-to-parapet-height sluice gates forming sheets of metals above and close to the water line which is created by these structures when lowered. The final section is a set of two facing ramps in part with canoe/boat rollers.

Purpose

The lock and barrages were installed in 1894 by the Thames Conservancy to maintain a broad navigable depth of water upstream of Richmond. The rising barrage ensures upstream at least 1.72 metres (5 ft 8 in) of water is in the standard navigation channel (away from banks) to the next lock, Teddington, and an annual draw-off (an all-tides lifting of the sluice gates) takes place to enable dredging to keep the advertised 1.72 metres (5 ft 8 in) minimum channel depth.

=== Ownership and operation ===
The Port of London Act 1908 (8 Edw. 7. c. 68) transferred responsibility for all points of the river downstream of a point 350 yards (320 m) below Teddington Lock to the Port of London Authority thereby including this structure.

=== Reasons for construction ===
Richmond Footbridge Sluices, Lock and Slipway Act 1890 (Note: Section 1.)
- Act of Parliament
- Parliament of the United Kingdom
- Long title: An Act to authorise the construction of a Footbridge with removable Sluices and a Lock and Slipway on the River Thames in the parishes of Richmond and Isleworth and for other purposes.
- Citation: 53 & 54 Vict. c. ccxxiv
- Territorial extent: United Kingdom

Dates
- Royal assent: 14 August 1890
- Commencement: 14 August 1890 (Note: The Acts of Parliament (Commencement) Act 1793.)
- Repealed: 26 July 1968

Other legislation
- Repealed by: Port of London Act 1968

Status: Repealed

Text of statute as originally enacted

When the London Bridge of 1209 to 1831 was demolished the removal of its bulky and elaborate piers resulted in the tides upstream returning to the rapid flows as they were downstream and before its forming of a near-barrier. That bridge was particularly dam-like when it housed 200 buildings in the Tudor period and in depictions at the time of the Great Fire of London which spared the bridge. This change, together with dredging of the lower river (lowest reaches) and construction of Teddington Lock and weir, meant that for hours of each day the Thames at Richmond, Twickenham, Ham, Petersham and northern Teddington, was a shallow watercourse running past great mud and shingle banks. The exception was after weeks of above-average rainfall when the river is known as in spate however such outflow hinders navigation upstream. By the late 19th century water extraction above Teddington had increased to four of five of the city's main waterworks and after light or normal rainfall more barges found it impossible to navigate the reach during and for hours around the two low tides each day. In 1890, after many years of petitioning, an act of Parliament was enacted to build the half-lock and weir, the Richmond Footbridge Sluices, Lock and Slipway Act 1890 (53 & 54 Vict. c. ccxxiv). This is among a small minority of Thames locks not to have been built around an island or islands (aits).

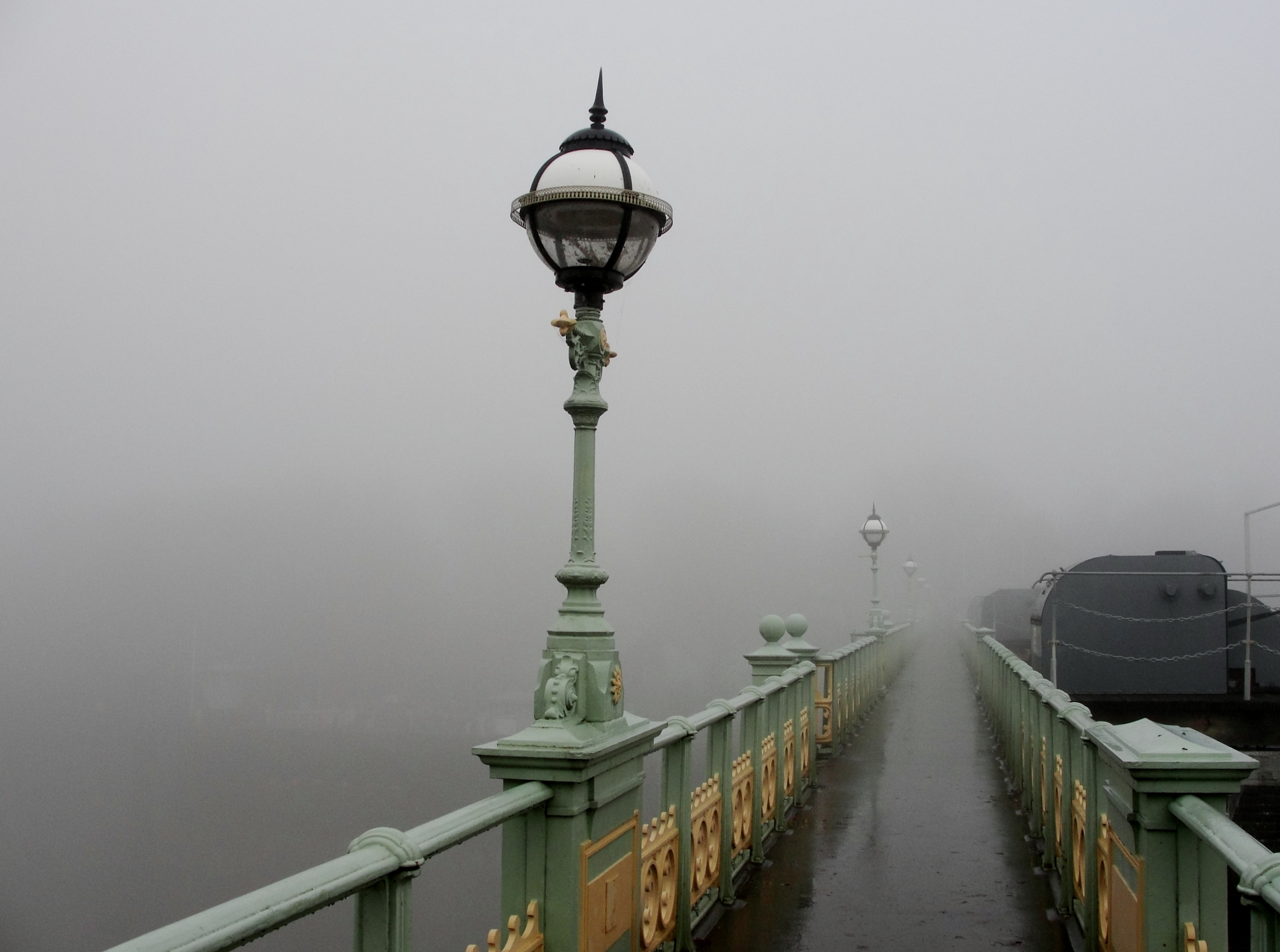
Richmond Footbridge

=== Details of design ===
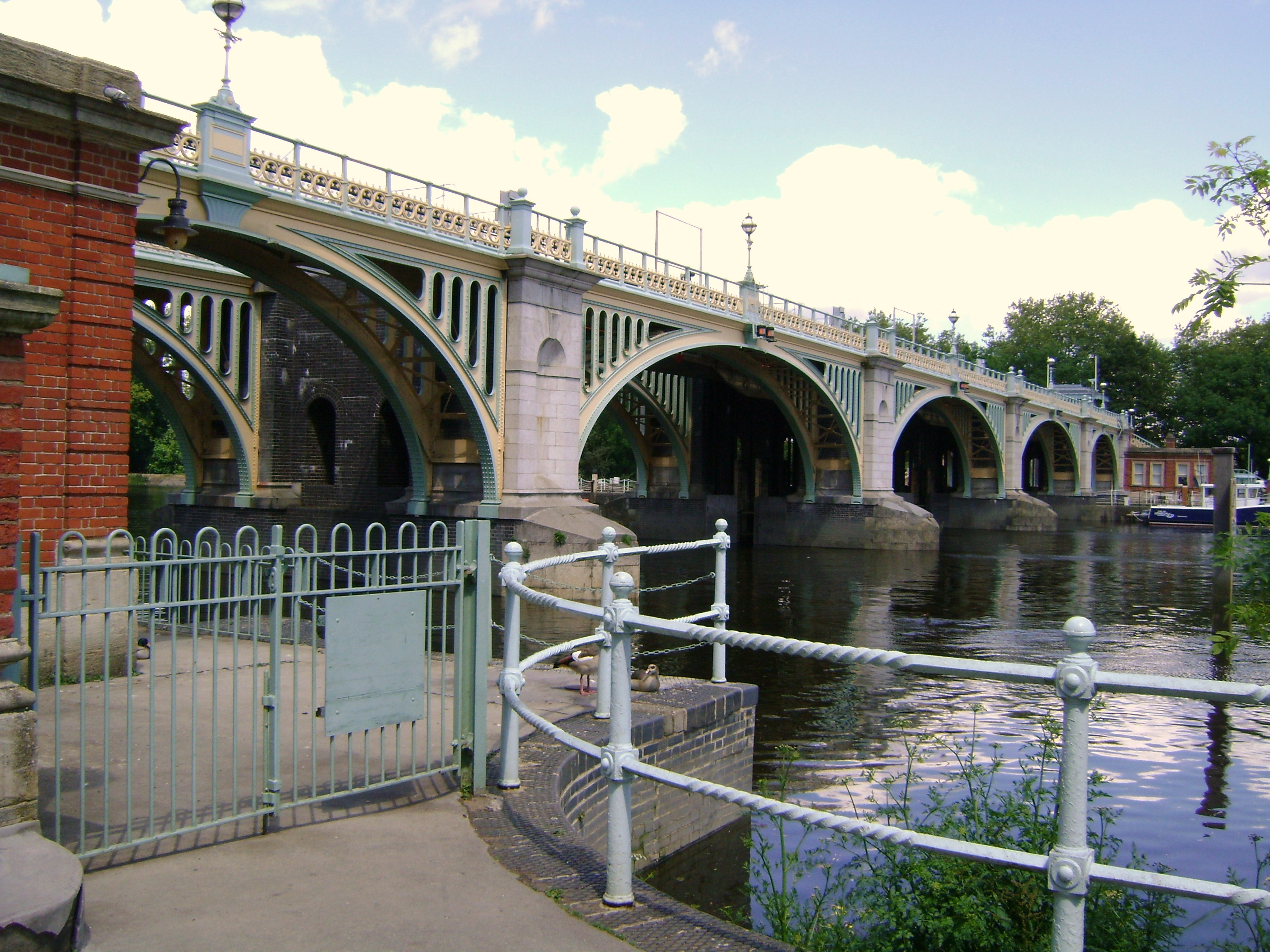
Detail of arches showing thousands of bricks at core of tall, great piers and forming most of the structure

A barge lock was constructed against the north-east ("Surrey") side. This is followed by four immense brick piers protected by large ashlar stone cutwaters (starlings). These in turn support relatively thin stone dressings reaching to the metal parapet level, carved in a classical style with reredos and cornices, supporting painted metal arches. A matching-colour balustrade is above the arches finished with black lanterns, metal pillars and simple finials. The piers house the barriers and the arches support a pair of horizontal decks (walkways). Against the opposite bank is a gently elevated slipway accessed from upstream and downstream parts of the river. As a superstructure was required to hold the suspended barriers, authorities agreed to build this in the form of two footbridges. The bridge was formally opened on 19 May 1894 by the then Duke of York (who later became King George V), having cost £61,000 (equivalent to £8,400,000 in 2023).

Richmond Lock is a half-tide lock and (half-tide) barrage which incorporates a public footbridge. The footbridge crosses the conventional lock, the barrages and the slipway, which comprises three vertical steel sluice gates suspended from the footbridge structure. Each sluice gate weighs 32 tons, is 66 feet (20 m) in width and 12 feet (3.7 m) in depth. The lock permits passage of vessels up to 250 feet (76 m) long by 26 feet 8 inches wide.

For about two hours each side of the published time of high tide the three sluice gates are raised into the footbridge supports above, and river traffic can pass through the barrage unimpeded. For the rest of the tidal cycle sluice gates are lowered – ships and boats must use the lock alongside the barrage at a cost of £10 per boat. Rowing boats and kayaks can use the roller solid slipways which reach an apex above the height of the barrages. The maximum fall of the lock is 10 feet (3.0 m).

== Historic operation ==
The sluice gates were manually operated by lock keepers, who lived in housing mostly contained under the pedestrian steps and landing on both banks.

From the date of the bridge's opening until some time during World War II, pedestrians were charged a toll of one (old) penny, i.e. 1/240 of a pound. However, sightseers who went onto the bridge and left from the same side had to pay tuppence (two old pence, 1/120 of a pound). The toll booths and the remains of the turnstile housings remain. Since two unconnected footbridges exist, one either side of the sluice-gate-holding brickwork and mechanisms, four toll booths and turnstiles had to be provided to collect the tolls.

== See also ==
- Locks on the River Thames
- Crossings of the River Thames
- List of bridges in London

== Sources ==
- https://web.archive.org/web/20070928004536/http://www.thames-tideway.co.uk/richlock.shtm
- http://www.victorianlondon.org/ql/queenslondon105.htm

Next bridge upstream	River Thames	Next bridge downstream
Twickenham Bridge	Richmond Lock and Footbridge; Grid reference TQ170751	Kew Bridge
Next lock upstream	River Thames	Next lock downstream
Teddington Lock	Richmond Lock and Footbridge; Grid reference TQ170751	none
