= Port of Tilbury Police =

Overview of the Police Force serving the Port of Tilbury, Essex

Agency overview
- Formed: 1909

Jurisdictional structure
- Operations jurisdiction: England, UK
- Legal jurisdiction: Land & Property belonging to Tilbury Port and up to 1-mile (1.6 km) from same
- Governing body: Forth Ports
- General nature: Civilian police

Operational structure
- Constables: 15
- Agency executive: Matthew Bass, Chief Police Officer (Chief Inspector)

Facilities
- Stations: 1

Website
- Official Website

The Port of Tilbury Police is a non-Home Office ports police force responsible for the Port of Tilbury, and Tilbury 2 owned by the Port of Tilbury London Ltd, a subsidiary of Forth Ports plc. The force consists of a Chief of Police, Police Inspector, three Police Sergeants and ten Police Constables.

== History ==
The force was originally formed in 1909 as the Port of London Police following Parliament's passing of the Port of London Authority Act 1908 on 21 December the previous year. The PLA took over control of all London's commercial docks from three separate private companies – the London and India Docks Company (running London Docks, St Katharines Dock, East India Docks, West India Docks, Tilbury Docks, Royal Albert Dock and Royal Victoria Dock), the Surrey Commercial Dock Company and the Millwall Dock Company. Each of those companies had had its own private police force to police its docks and these were merged to form the new PLA Police, with jurisdiction in the docks themselves and within a mile of them. Additionally Thames Division of the Metropolitan Police had originally been founded in 1798 as the Thames River Police to police shipping in the Pool of London.

=== Fallen officers ===
Eight of the force's officers drowned in the docks between 1913 and 1951, with other fatal casualties from being run over by a train, crushed under part of a ship's cargo and falling into a dry dock. The docks were badly hit during the Blitz and PC Robert Charles Winney and Sergeant Charles Edward Showell received posthumous King's Commendations for Brave Conduct in Civil Defence after being killed by an unexploded bomb on the night of 18-19 September 1940.

== Modern day ==
In 1992 the PLA Police was downsized, delimited to just the Port of Tilbury and given its present name – the other docks are now policed by the Metropolitan Police, particularly its Marine Support Unit.

In 2000 the force was reduced from 20 officers, to 11. The CID was disbanded.

In 2018, there were fifteen police officers in the force.

== Rank structure ==
The Port of Tilbury Police has a rank structure.

The rank structure is below (junior ranks from the left). The numbers worn are known as "collar numbers" and are used to identify police officers. Generally they are only worn by uniformed officers, below the rank of Inspector.

Port of Tilbury Police rank structure
| Rank | Constable | Sergeant | Inspector | Chief Police Officer |
|---|---|---|---|---|
| Insignia | PC Epaulette | PS Epaulette | | n/a |

== Powers of constables ==
Port constables are appointed by the port company (Forth Ports), and are attested by a justice of the peace. The oath is given by Schedule 6 to the Port of London Act 1968. The port company can suspend or terminate the appointment of a port constable.

A port constable has all the powers and privileges of his office within the "port police area" (which is land that is owned by the port company and used for the port) and anywhere within one mile of that land.

In addition, if a port constable pursues a suspect from the port police area, he has the same powers of arrest as he would in the port police area. Impersonating a port constable is an offence.

=== Entry ===
A port constable may enter any vessel within the port police area (and can take people with him to assist if he thinks it necessary):

- if, with reasonable cause, he suspects that an indictable offence has been, or is about to be, committed on board the vessel, or
- in order to arrest a person whom he may lawfully arrest, or
- if, with reasonable cause, he believes that by so doing he will be able to facilitate the detection of an indictable offence committed, or the prevention of an indictable offence which he, with reasonable cause, suspects is about to be committed, within the port police area.

A port constable may seize anything found on board which he, with reasonable cause, suspects to have been stolen or otherwise unlawfully obtained.

=== Entry and search ===
A port constable may, within the port premises, enter and search a vessel or vehicle if he, with reasonable cause, suspects that he might find anything which has been stolen or otherwise unlawfully obtained:

- on or from the port premises, or
- on or from a vessel either in a dock of the Port Authority or at a pier provided by the Port Authority.

A port constable may seize anything found on board the vessel or in the vehicle which he with reasonable cause suspects to have been so stolen or obtained unlawfully.

=== Stop and search ===
Any constable (not just a port constable) may, within the port police area, stop and search a person whom he, with reasonable cause, suspects of having or conveying in any manner anything which has been stolen or otherwise unlawfully obtained:

- on or from the port premises, or
- on or from a vessel either in a dock of the Port Authority or at a pier provided by the Port Authority.

=== Other provisions ===
It is an offence to resist, obstruct or impede a constable in the execution of his duty, or to not carry out the lawful orders of a constable.

A constable may detain a person who, after being warned by an officer of the Port Authority not to do so, gets on to, or remains, on a movable bridge belonging to the Port Authority, when it is about to be moved, or is being moved, or before it is properly closed and fastened, if that person's name and address is unknown to and cannot be ascertained by the constable.

Serious or major incidents or crimes become the responsibility of the local territorial police force police force, Essex Police.

== Other legislation ==
=== The Prosecution of Offences Act 1985 (Specified Police Forces) Order 1985 ===
The Port of Tilbury Police are recognised as a 'specified police force' who can instigate criminal proceedings under the auspices of the Crown Prosecution Service.

=== The Police Regulations 2003 ===
The Port of Tilbury Police are the only port constabulary where the length of service of constables is recognised for the purposes of reckonable service should they join a territorial police force or the British Transport Police.

=== Marine Navigation Act 2013 ===
Port of Tilbury police officers are classed as 'port constables' by virtue of section 7 of the Act, which allows a chief officer of a territorial police force to grant permission for port constables to act within the relevant territorial police area in relation to port police business. As of July 2014, the Port of Tilbury Police had not applied to the Chief Constable of Essex to extend their jurisdiction to that of the police force area of Essex Police in relation to port police business.

== See also ==
- Law enforcement in the United Kingdom
- List of law enforcement agencies in the United Kingdom
