= East India Docks =

Historic docks in Blackwall, London

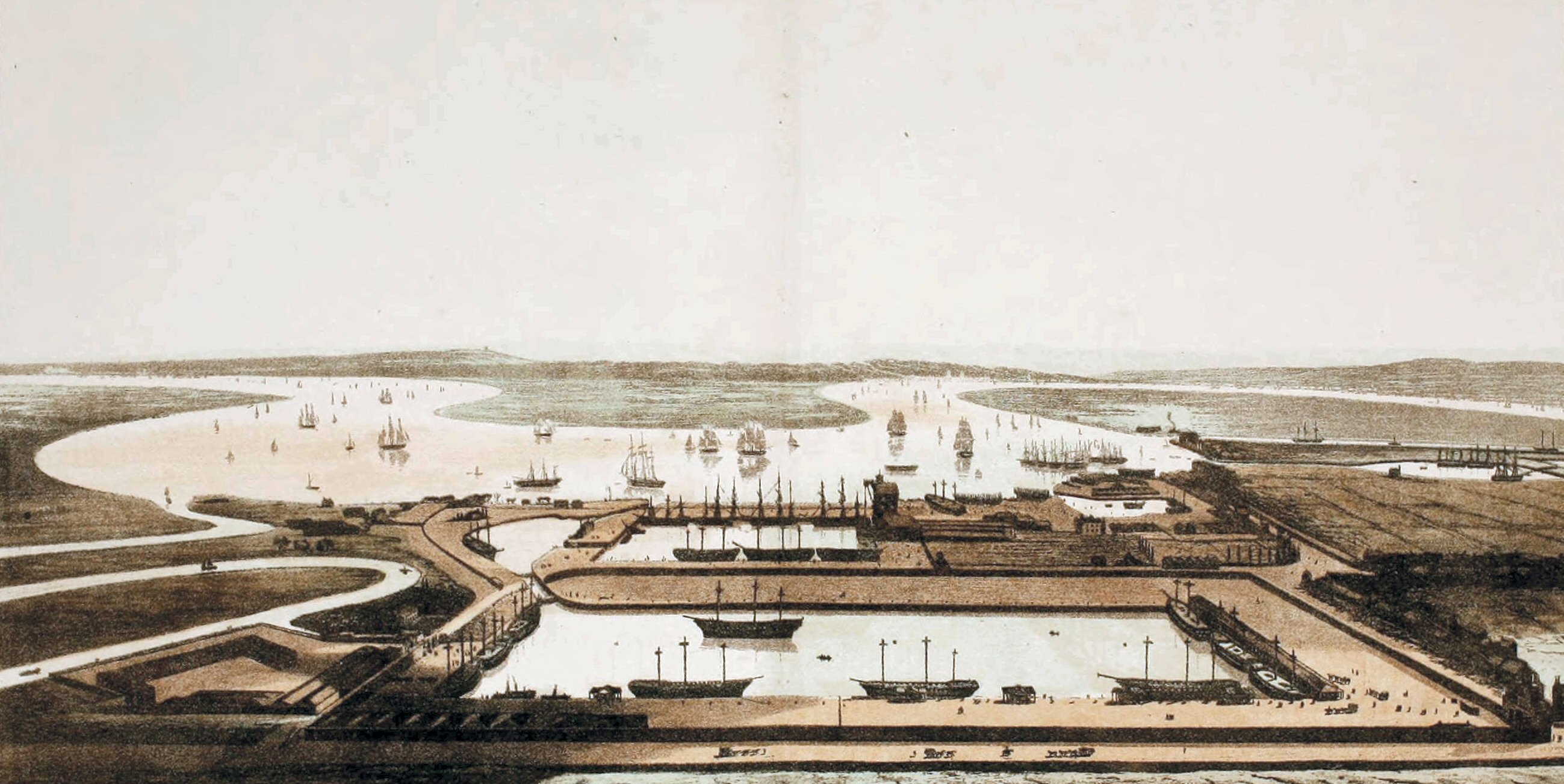
- Illustration of East India Docks looking south towards the River Thames, 1806. The original Brunswick Dock and mast house (latterly known as the Export Dock) can be seen alongside the river. The Import Dock is in the foreground.

- Location within London Borough of Tower Hamlets
- 51.5081°N 0.001°E
- Location: London

History
- Built: 1803; 223 years ago
- Built for: East India Company
- Demolished: 1967; 59 years ago

Site notes
- Architect: Ralph Walker

The East India Docks were a group of docks in Blackwall in east London, north-east of the Isle of Dogs. Today only the entrance basin and listed perimeter wall remain visible.

== History ==
=== Early history ===
East India Docks Act 1803
- Act of Parliament
- Parliament of the United Kingdom
- Long title: An Act for the further Improvement of the Port of London, by making Docks and other Works at Blackwall, for the Accommodation of the East India Shipping in the said Port.
- Citation: 43 Geo. 3. c. cxxvi
- Territorial extent: United Kingdom

Dates
- Royal assent: 27 July 1803
- Commencement: 27 July 1803 (Note: The Acts of Parliament (Commencement) Act 1793.)
- Repealed: 19 June 1828
Other legislation
| Amended by | East India Docks Act 1806; East India Docks (Blackwall) Act 1814 |
| Repealed by | East India Dock Act 1828 |

Status: Repealed

Text of statute as originally enacted

East India Docks Act 1806
- Act of Parliament
- Parliament of the United Kingdom
- Long title: An Act for altering and enlarging the Powers of an Act, made in the Forty third Year of His present Majesty, for the further Improvement of the Port of London, by making Docks and other Works at Blackwall, for the Accommodation of the East India Shipping in the said Port.
- Citation: 46 Geo. 3. c. cxiii
- Territorial extent: United Kingdom

Dates
- Royal assent: 12 July 1806
- Commencement: 12 July 1806
- Repealed: 19 June 1828
Other legislation
| Amends | East India Docks Act 1803 |
| Amended by | East India Docks (Blackwall) Act 1814 |
| Repealed by | East India Docks Act 1828 |

Status: Repealed

Text of statute as originally enacted

East India Docks (Blackwall) Act 1814
- Act of Parliament
- Parliament of the United Kingdom
- Long title: An Act for amending and enlarging the Powers of Two Acts made in the Forty third and Forty sixth Years of His present Majesty for the further Improvement of the Port of London, by making Docks and other Works at Blackwall, for the Accommodation of the East India Shipping in the said Port.
- Citation: 54 Geo. 3. c. ccxxviii
- Territorial extent: United Kingdom

Dates
- Royal assent: 28 July 1814
- Commencement: 28 July 1814
- Repealed: 19 June 1828
Other legislation
| Amends | East India Docks Act 1803; East India Docks Act 1806 |
| Repealed by | East India Docks Act 1828 |

Status: Repealed

Following the successful creation of the West India Docks which opened in 1802, an act of Parliament, the East India Docks Act 1803 (43 Geo. 3. c. cxxvi) set up the East India Dock Company, promoted by the Honourable East India Company. Joseph Cotton was chairman of the dock company from 1803. The foundation stone was laid on 11 March 1805 and the sluices of its floating gate opened on 26 July 1806, being ready to receive ships five days later.

The docks, designed by engineer Ralph Walker, were located to the north-east of the West India Docks. They were based on the existing Brunswick Dock, which had been used for fitting out and repairing ships as part of Blackwall Yard. The Brunswick Dock, which had originally been connected directly to the Thames to the south, became the Export Dock. To the north the company built a larger 18-acre (7.3 ha) Import Dock. Both were connected to the Thames via an eastern entrance basin.

The company rapidly became profitable through its trade in commodities such as tea, spices, indigo, silk and Persian carpets. The tea trade alone was worth £30 million a year. The docks spawned further local industry, with spice merchants and pepper grinders setting up around the dock to process goods.

East India Dock Act 1835
- Act of Parliament
- Parliament of the United Kingdom
- Long title: An Act for enlarging the Powers of an Act passed in the Ninth Year of the Reign of King George the Fourth, to consolidate and amend several Acts for the further Improvement of the Port of London, by making Docks and other Works at Blackwall for the Accommodation of East India Shipping.
- Citation: 5 & 6 Will. 4. c. xliv
- Territorial extent: United Kingdom

Dates
- Royal assent: 3 July 1835
- Commencement: 3 July 1835
- Repealed: 23 December 1920
Other legislation
| Amends | East India Dock Act 1828 |
| Repealed by | Port of London (Consolidation) Act 1920 |

Status: Repealed

The East India Dock Act 1828 (9 Geo. 4. c. xcv) consolidated acts relating the docks.

The two companies were merged by the West and East India Dock Act 1838 (1 & 2 Vict. c. ix) to form the East and West India Dock Company. In 1886, in the last act of a ruinous game of leapfrog with the London and Saint Katharine Docks Company, they built the Tilbury Docks. The East and West India Dock Company operated in cooperation with the London and Saint Katharine Docks Company from 1888, and the two companies merged by the London and India Docks Amalgamation Act 1900 (63 & 64 Vict. c. cxi) as the London and India Docks Company on 1 January 1901. On 31 March 1909, by the Port of London Act 1908 (8 Edw. 7. c. 68) the docks were taken over by the Port of London Authority, along with the other enclosed docks.

While much smaller than the West India Docks or the later Royal Docks, the East India Docks could still handle East Indiamen of 1,000 tons and up to 250 ships at one time. However the advent of steam power and larger ships reduced the importance of this dock. The docks played a key role in the Second World War as a location for constructing the floating Mulberry harbours used by the Allies to support the D-Day landings in France.

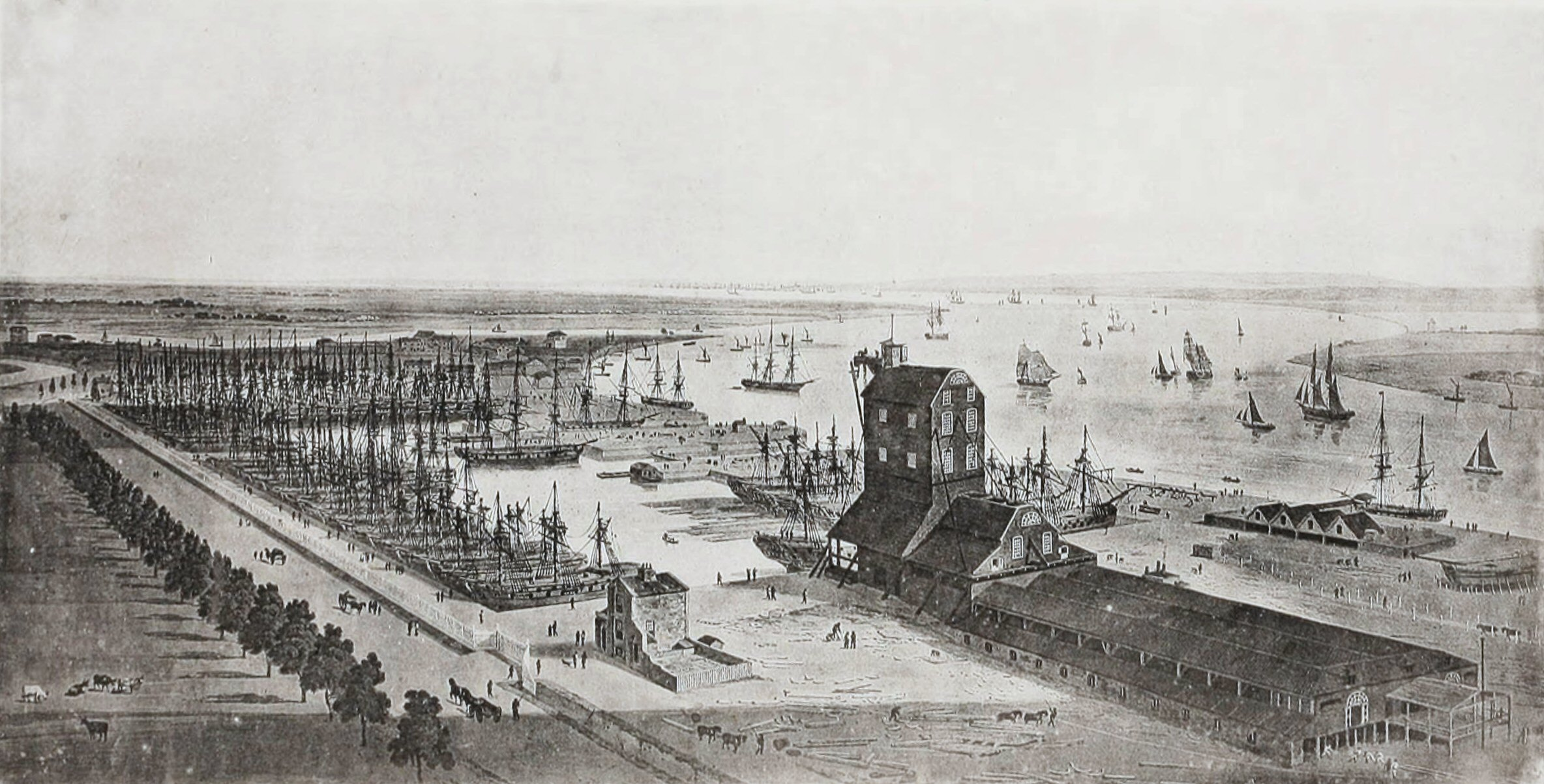
Brunswick Dock, which became the Export Dock

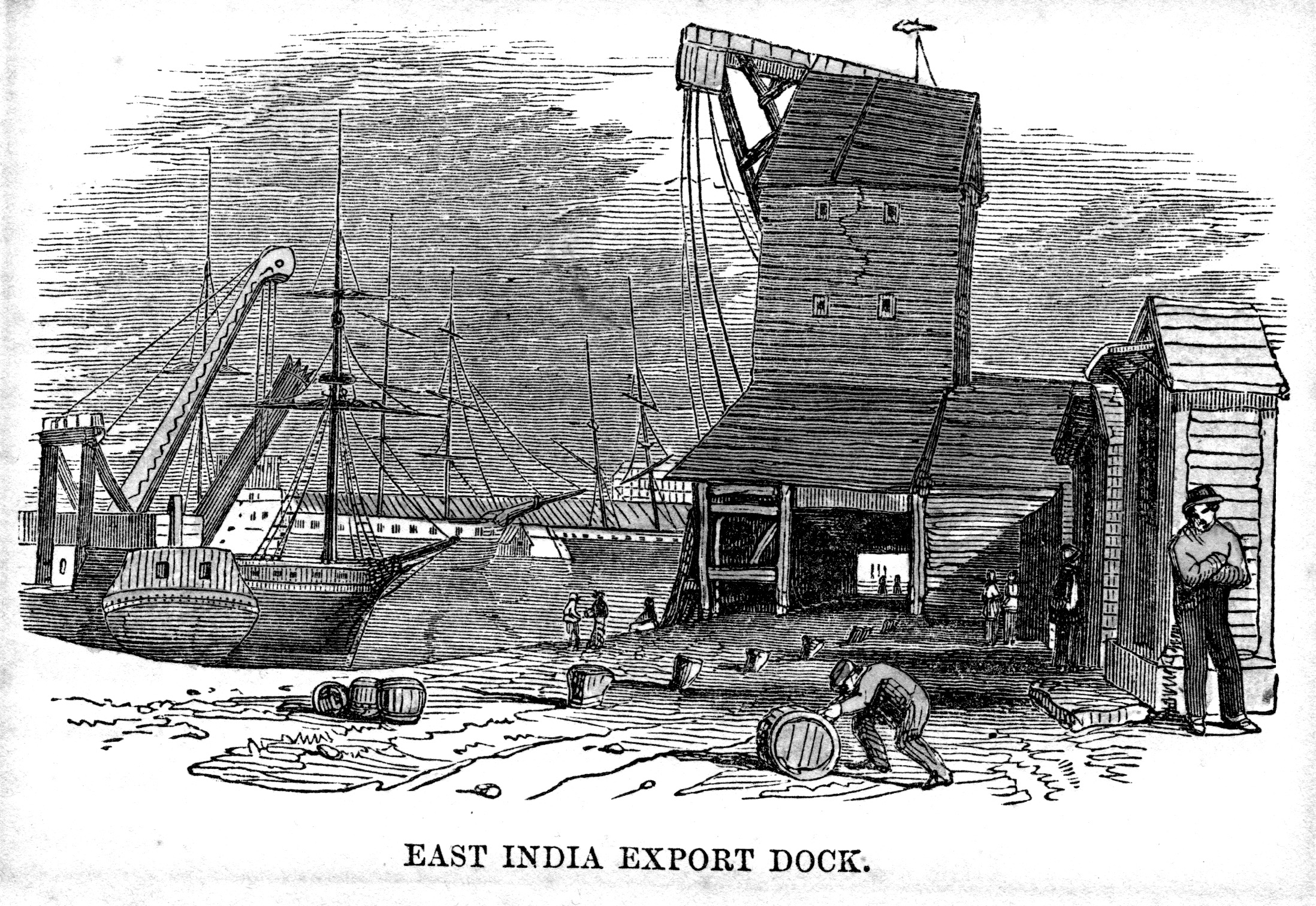
East India Export Dock, 1843

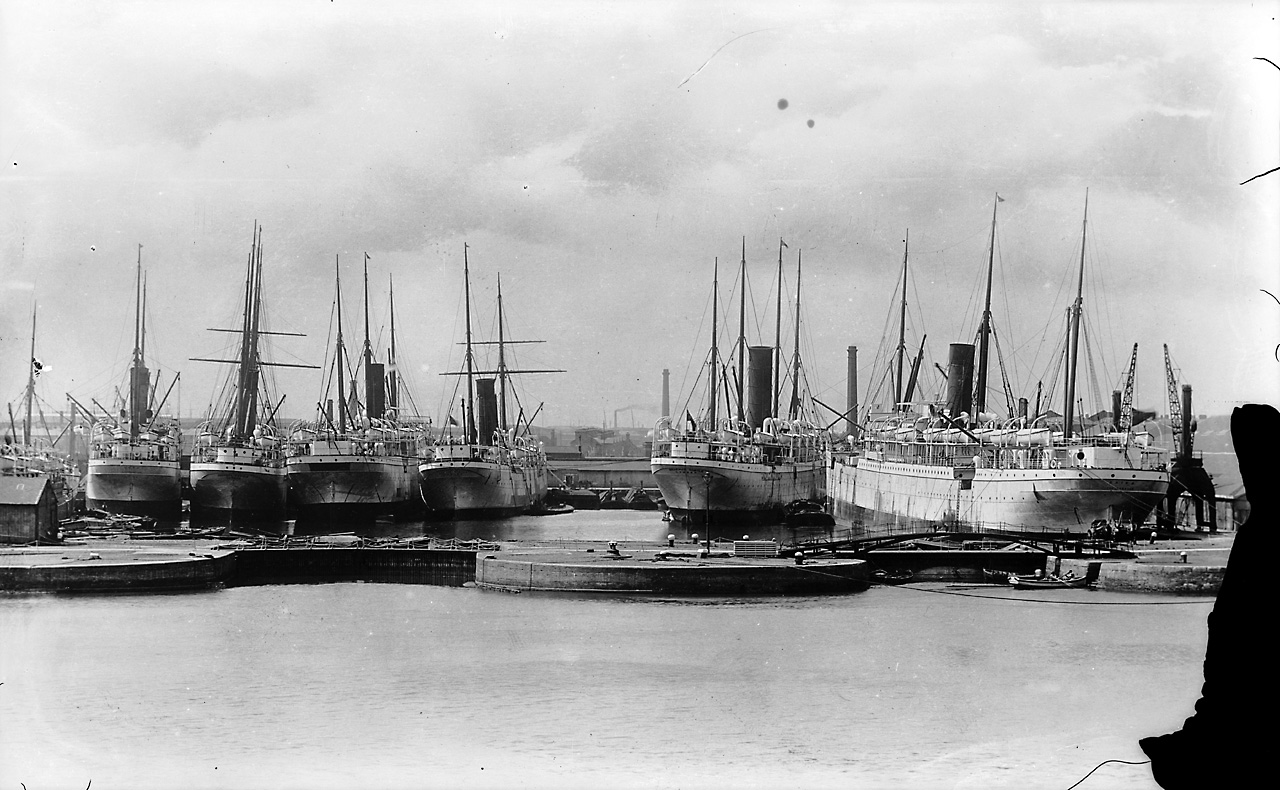
Union-Castle liners in East India Docks in 1902

After the war, during which all the docks were badly damaged, the East India Docks were confined to occasional Channel Islands traffic and to the maintenance of equipment including dredgers.

Brunswick Wharf Power Station, a monumental brick structure with fluted concrete chimneys, was built on the site of the Export Dock in stages between 1946 and 1956; it has since been decommissioned and demolished.

From the 1960s onwards, the East India Docks experienced a steady decline – as did all of London's other docks – as the shipping industry adopted containerisation, which effectively moved traffic downstream to Tilbury. In 1967 the East India Docks were the first of the London docks to close.

=== Layout ===
The original docks consisted of an Import Dock of 18 acres (73,000 m^{2}) of water, to the north of the site, and an Export Dock of 15 acres (61,000 m^{2}), to the south of the site. There was also an Entrance Dock of 2.75 acres (11,100 m^{2}) of water on the east of the site.

=== Redevelopment ===
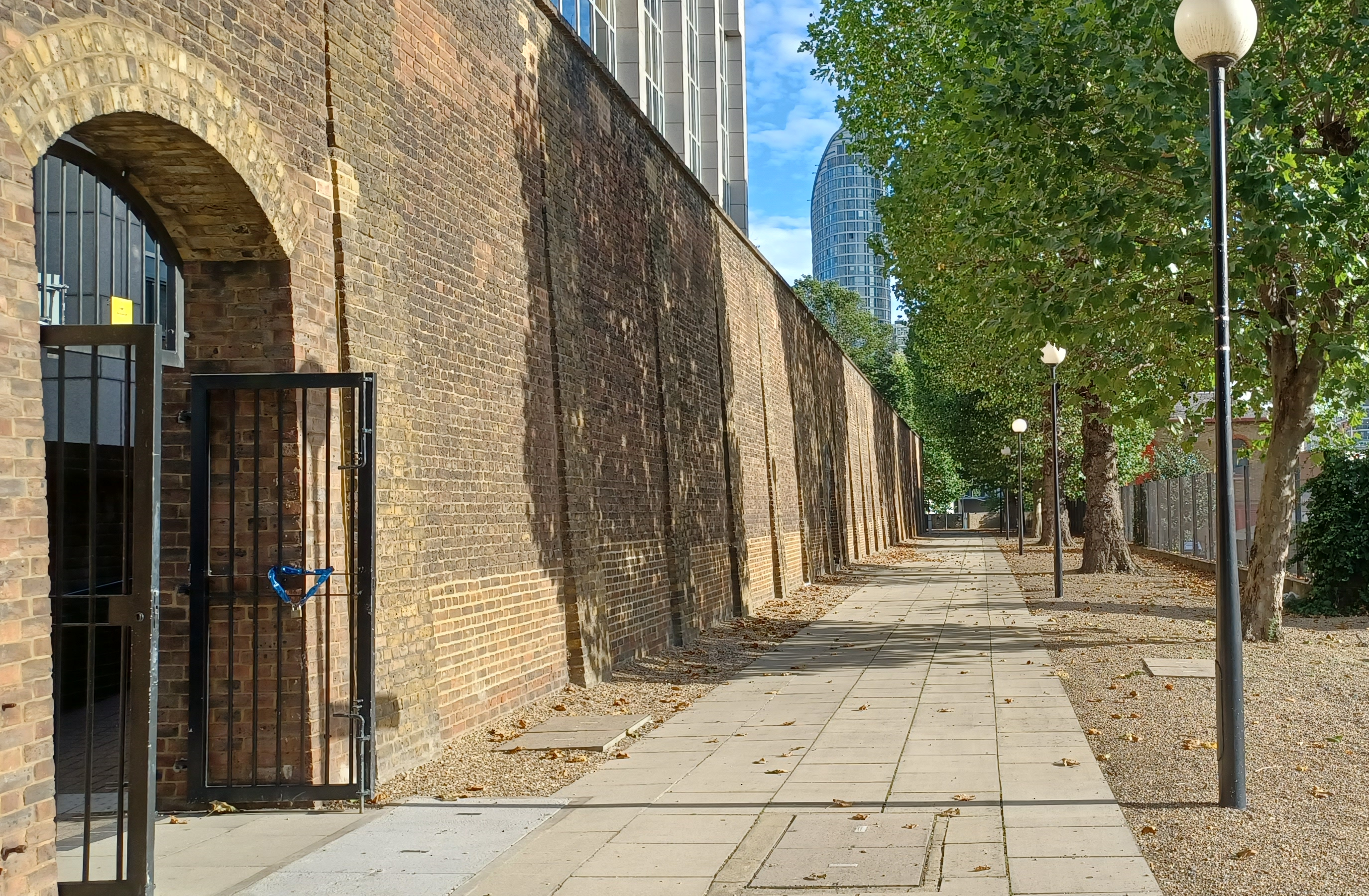
The boundary wall, on the west side of the Republic office campus

In the late 20th century the docks were mostly filled in and only the entrance basin remains, as a wildlife refuge and an attractive local amenity. Since 1994 the area has been served by its own Docklands Light Railway East India station.

Developments on the site of the Import Dock include the Mulberry Place in 1992 and the Republic campus with offices, retail and public space which was largely completed in 2019. Two buildings on the campus have been renamed as Import and Export to provide a nod to the site's past. The names of the streets on the site of the Import Dock reflect the names of some of the goods traded here: Clove Crescent, Nutmeg Lane, Coriander Avenue, Oregano Drive, Rosemary Drive and Saffron Avenue.

The site of the Export Dock was converted into a residential development named Virginia Quay, with an amenity with mature trees known as Virginia Quay Park. In 1999, the Virginia Quay Settlers Monument was unveiled, replacing a 1928 plaque on the site. East India Dock Basin exists now as a nature reserve, providing a tidal mudflat habitat for birds such as Kingfishers and Terns.
