= East and West India Dock Company =

London dock operator

The East and West India Dock Company was formed by the merger of the West India Dock Company and the East India Dock Company in 1838.

== History ==
=== West India Dock Company ===
The West India Dock Company was created by the Port of London Improvement and City Canal Act 1799 (39 Geo. 3. c. lxix). The docks opened on the Isle of Dogs in 1802.

=== East India Dock Company ===
The East India Dock Company was created by the East India Docks Act 1803 (43 Geo. 3. c. cxxvi). It had been promoted by the East India Company. The docks, located to the north-east of the West India Docks, opened in 1806.

=== Amalgamation ===
West and East India Dock Act 1838
- Act of Parliament
- Parliament of the United Kingdom
- Long title: An Act to amend the several Acts relating to the West India Dock Company and the East India Dock Company; and to consolidate the said Companies.
- Citation: 1 & 2 Vict. c. ix
- Territorial extent: United Kingdom

Dates
- Royal assent: 9 May 1838
- Commencement: 9 May 1838 (Note: The Acts of Parliament (Commencement) Act 1793.)
- Repealed: 23 December 1920
Other legislation
Repealed by	Port of London (Consolidation) Act 1920

Status: Repealed

Text of statute as originally enacted

East and West India Docks Act 1865
- Act of Parliament
- Parliament of the United Kingdom
- Long title: An Act to amend the Acts relating to the East and West India Dock Company.
- Citation: 28 & 29 Vict. c. xxx
- Territorial extent: United Kingdom

Dates
- Royal assent: 26 May 1865
- Commencement: 26 May 1865
- Repealed: 23 December 1920
Other legislation
Repealed by	Port of London (Consolidation) Act 1920

Status: Repealed

East and West India Dock Company Act 1874 (Note: Section 1.)
- Act of Parliament
- Parliament of the United Kingdom
- Long title: An Act to amend the Acts relating to the East and West India Dock Company.
- Citation: 37 & 38 Vict. c. lix
- Territorial extent: United Kingdom

Dates
- Royal assent: 30 June 1874
- Commencement: 30 June 1874
- Repealed: 23 December 1920
Other legislation
Amends	West India Docks Act 1831
Amended by	East and West India Dock Company's Act 1879
Repealed by	Port of London (Consolidation) Act 1920

Status: Repealed

Text of statute as originally enacted

East and West India Dock Company's Act 1879
- Act of Parliament
- Parliament of the United Kingdom
- Long title: An Act to authorise the East and West India Dock Company to acquire additional Lands; raise further Capital; and for other purposes.
- Citation: 42 & 43 Vict. c. clxix
- Territorial extent: United Kingdom

Dates
- Royal assent: 21 July 1879
- Commencement: 21 July 1879
- Repealed: 23 December 1920
Other legislation
Amends	East and West India Dock Company Act 1874
Repealed by	Port of London (Consolidation) Act 1920

Status: Repealed

Text of statute as originally enacted

East and West India Dock Company's Act 1883
- Act of Parliament
- Parliament of the United Kingdom
- Long title: An Act to confirm an Agreement between the London, Tilbury, and Southend Railway Company and the East and West India Dock Company, with reference to a supply of water and for other purposes.
- Citation: 46 & 47 Vict. c. xxxix
- Territorial extent: United Kingdom

Dates
- Royal assent: 18 June 1883
- Commencement: 18 June 1883
- Repealed: 23 December 1920
Other legislation
Repealed by	Port of London (Consolidation) Act 1920

Status: Repealed

East and West India Dock Company's Act 1886
- Act of Parliament
- Parliament of the United Kingdom
- Long title: An Act to authorise the East and West India Dock Company to consolidate their Debenture Stock and to raise further Money, and for other purposes.
- Citation: 49 & 50 Vict. c. xxvi
- Territorial extent: United Kingdom

Dates
- Royal assent: 4 June 1886
- Commencement: 4 June 1886
- Repealed: 23 December 1920
Other legislation
Repealed by	Port of London (Consolidation) Act 1920

Status: Repealed

Text of statute as originally enacted

The West India Dock Company took over the East India Docks by the West and East India Dock Act 1838 (1 & 2 Vict. c. ix), and was renamed the East and West India Dock Company.

In the last act of a game of leapfrog with the London and Saint Katharine Docks Company, the East and West India Dock Company obtained the East and West India Dock Company's Extension Act 1882 (45 & 46 Vict. c. xc), built the Tilbury Docks.

=== London and India Docks Company ===
The East and West India Dock Company operated in cooperation with the London and Saint Katharine Docks Company after the London and Saint Katharine and East and West India Docks Act 1888 (51 & 52 Vict. c. cxliii) was passed and the docks passed into the management of the London and India Docks Joint Committee, with representatives of both companies.

The two companies formally merged by the London and India Docks Amalgamation Act 1900 (63 & 64 Vict. c. cxi) as the London and India Docks Company on 1 January 1901.

=== Port of London Authority ===
On 31 March 1909, by the Port of London Act 1908 (8 Edw. 7. c. 68), the London and India Docks Company was taken over by the Port of London Authority.

== See also ==
- London and Saint Katharine Docks Company
