= Barrier Gardens Pier =

Pier on the River Thames in London

Coordinates: 51°29′44″N 0°2′30″E

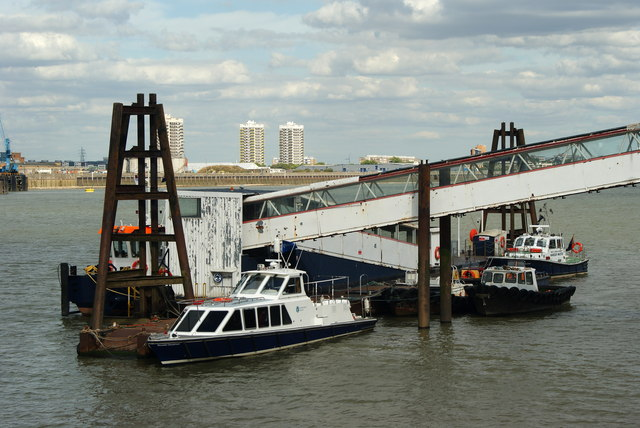
Barrier Gardens Pier

Barrier Gardens Pier is a pier on the River Thames near the Thames Barrier. It is owned and managed by the Port of London Authority (PLA) which took over the pier and adjoining Unity House from the Environment Agency and Sargent Brothers in 2009.

The PLA use the pier as a base for their Driftwood craft and upper river harbour patrol vessels. The pier is also used by external companies to moor at and embark/disembark passengers to the Thames Barrier Visitor Centre.
