= Port of London (Consolidation) Act 1920 =

Act of the Parliament of the United Kingdom

Port of London (Consolidation) Act 1920 (Note: Section 1.)
- Act of Parliament
- Parliament of the United Kingdom
- Long title: An Act to consolidate, amend, and extend the statutory powers of the Port of London Authority, and for other purposes.
- Citation: 10 & 11 Geo. 5. c. clxxiii
- Territorial extent: United Kingdom

Dates
- Royal assent: 23 December 1920
- Commencement: 23 December 1920 (Note: The Acts of Parliament (Commencement) Act 1793.)
Other legislation
Repeals/revokes	See § Repealed enactments
Amended by	Port of London Act 1908; Port of London (Finance) Act 1923; Port of London (Dock Charges) Act 1923; Thames Conservancy Act 1932; Police Act 1964; SI 1967/168; SI 1967/1197; Port of London Act 1968
Relates to	Port of London Act 1908; Public Health (London) Act 1936

Status: Partially repealed

Text of statute as originally enacted

The Port of London (Consolidation) Act 1920 (10 & 11 Geo. 5. c. clxxiii) was a local act of the Parliament of the United Kingdom that consolidated, amended and extended the statutory powers of the Port of London Authority and of the dock companies and other bodies it had superseded.

== Background ==
The Port of London Authority (referred to in the act as "the Port Authority") had been incorporated by the Port of London Act 1908, which vested in it the property, powers, rights, authorities, privileges, duties and obligations formerly held by the East and West India Dock Company, the London and St Katharine Docks Company, the Surrey Commercial Dock Company, the Millwall Dock Company and the Thames Conservancy, among others. (Note: Preamble.) By 1920 the constitution, powers, rights, authorities, privileges, duties and obligations of the Port Authority were defined by, or by reference to, some 49 separate acts passed between 1828 and 1917, and it was considered expedient that these should be unified, consolidated and amended in a single act. (Note: Preamble.) The bill was introduced in the House of Lords and received its second reading in the House of Commons on 28 October 1920, where it was described as "in substance...a Consolidation Bill" and "a very useful, a very businesslike Bill".

== Provisions ==
Part I of the act dealt with preliminary matters, including its short title and an extensive interpretation section. (Note: Sections 1, 2.) Section 4 provided that, notwithstanding the repeal of the acts listed in the third schedule, the sections and provisions of those acts set out in the fourth schedule to the act were to remain in force and were unaffected by the act, save that references in those saved provisions to the superseded dock companies, the conservators or their officers were to be read as references to the Port Authority and its officers. (Note: Section 4.) Section 5 separately preserved the effect of the Thames Conservancy Act 1894, the Thames Conservancy Act 1905, the Port of London Act 1908 and the Thames Conservancy (Appointments and Tolls) Provisional Order Act 1910 so far as they related to the Thames above the tidal limit and to the powers and duties of the conservators of the upper river. (Note: Section 5.)

=== Repealed enactments ===
Section 3 of the act repealed 49 enactments, listed in parts I to IX of the third schedule to the act, subject in the case of the Port of London Act 1908, the Surrey Commercial Dock Act 1864 and the Watermen's and Lightermen's Amendment Act 1859 to the exceptions set out in that schedule.

==== Part I: Acts relating to the East and West India Dock Company ====
Part I — Acts relating to the East and West India Dock Company
Citation	Short title	Extent of repeal
9 Geo. 4. c. xcv	East India Dock Act 1828	The whole act.
1 & 2 Will. 4. c. lii	West India Dock Act 1831	The whole act.
5 & 6 Will. 4. c. xliv	East India Dock Act 1835	The whole act.
1 Vict. c. ix	East and West India Docks Act 1838	The whole act.
28 Vict. c. xxx	East and West India Docks Act 1865	The whole act.
37 & 38 Vict. c. lix	East and West India Dock Company Act 1874	The whole act.
42 & 43 Vict. c. clxix	East and West India Dock Company's Act 1879	The whole act.
45 & 46 Vict. c. xc	East and West India Dock Company's Extension Act 1882	The whole act.
46 Vict. c. xxxix	East and West India Dock Company's Act 1883	The whole act.
48 Vict. c. xxv	East and West India Dock Company's Act 1885	The whole act.
49 Vict. c. xxvi	East and West India Dock Company's Act 1886	The whole act.
55 Vict. c. v	East and West India Dock Company's Act 1892	The whole act.

==== Part II: Acts relating to the London and St Katharine Docks Company ====
Part II — Acts relating to the London and St Katharine Docks Company
Citation	Short title	Extent of repeal
27 & 28 Vict. c. clxxviii	London and St. Katharine Docks Act 1864	The whole act.
38 & 39 Vict. c. cliii	London and St. Katharine Docks Company Act 1875	The whole act.
41 Vict. c. xxii	London and St. Katharine Docks Act 1878	The whole act.
45 Vict. c. ii	London and St. Katharine Docks Act 1882	The whole act.
47 Vict. c. xv	London and St. Katharine Docks Company Act 1884	The whole act.

==== Part III: Acts relating to the London and India Docks Joint Committee ====
Part III — Acts relating to the London and India Docks Joint Committee
Citation	Short title	Extent of repeal
51 & 52 Vict. c. cxliii	London and St. Katharine and East and West India Docks Act 1888	The whole act.
55 & 56 Vict. c. cxxxi	London and India Docks Act 1892	The whole act.

==== Part IV: Acts relating to the London and India Docks Company ====
Part IV — Acts relating to the London and India Docks Company
Citation	Short title	Extent of repeal
63 & 64 Vict. c. cxi	London and India Docks Amalgamation Act 1900	The whole act.
1 Edw. 7. c. ccxxvii	London and India Docks Company (New Works) Act 1901	The whole act.
2 Edw. 7. c. ccxliii	London and India Docks Company (Various Powers) Act 1902	The whole act.
4 Edw. 7. c. ccxviii	London and India Docks Company Act 1904	The whole act.

==== Part V: Acts relating to the Surrey Commercial Dock Company ====
Part V — Acts relating to the Surrey Commercial Dock Company
Citation	Short title	Extent of repeal
27 Vict. c. xxxi	Surrey Commercial Dock Act 1864	The whole act except Schedule B.
57 & 58 Vict. c. lxvii	Surrey Commercial Dock Act 1894	The whole act.
62 Vict. c. xviii	Surrey Commercial Dock Act 1899	The whole act.
4 Edw. 7. c. ccii	Surrey Commercial Dock Act 1904	The whole act.

==== Part VI: Acts relating to the Millwall Dock Company ====
Part VI — Acts relating to the Millwall Dock Company
Citation	Short title	Extent of repeal
27 & 28 Vict. c. cclv	Millwall Canal Wharfs and Graving Docks Act 1864	The whole act.
29 & 30 Vict. c. cccxxiii	Millwall Canal Act 1866	The whole act.
33 Vict. c. xx	Millwall Dock Act 1870	The whole act.
42 & 43 Vict. c. lxvii	Millwall Dock Act 1879	The whole act.
45 Vict. c. xxxvi	Millwall Dock Act 1882	The whole act.
50 Vict. Sess. 2. c. xxvii	Millwall Dock Act 1887	The whole act.
59 Vict. c. ix	Millwall Dock Act 1896	The whole act.
62 & 63 Vict. c. clxiii	Millwall Dock Act 1899	The whole act.
6 Edw. 7. c. vii	Millwall Dock Act 1906	The whole act.

==== Part VII: Acts relating to the Port of London Authority ====
Part VII — Acts relating to the Port of London Authority
Citation	Short title	Extent of repeal
8 Edw. 7. c. 68	Port of London Act 1908	The whole act except section 60 and the seventh and eighth schedules, so far as still in force and operative.
10 Edw. 7 & 1 Geo. 5. c. xcix	Port of London (Registration of Craft) Order Confirmation Act 1910	The whole act.
10 Edw. 7 & 1 Geo. 5. c. c	Port of London (Port Rates on Goods) Provisional Order Act 1910	The whole act.
1 & 2 Geo. 5. c. xxvii	Port of London Act 1911	The whole act.
1 & 2 Geo. 5. c. clxv	Port of London (First Election of Members) Provisional Order Act 1911	The whole act.
2 & 3 Geo. 5. c. lii	Port of London Act 1912	The whole act.
4 & 5 Geo. 5. c. xviii	Port of London (Amendment) Act 1914	The whole act.
5 & 6 Geo. 5. c. lv	Port of London Act 1915	The whole act.
7 & 8 Geo. 5. c. xliv	Port of London Act 1917	The whole act.

==== Part VIII: Acts relating to the Thames Conservancy ====
Part VIII — Acts relating to the Thames Conservancy
Citation	Short title	Extent of repeal
57 & 58 Vict. c. clxxxvii	Thames Conservancy Act 1894	The whole act.
5 Edw. 7. c. cxcviii	Thames Conservancy Act 1905	The whole act.

==== Part IX ====
Part IX
Citation	Short title	Extent of repeal
22 & 23 Vict. c. cxxxiii	The Watermen's and Lightermen's Amendment Act 1859	The whole act except sections 1, 2, 3, 8, 10 to 16 inclusive, 18 to 23 inclusive, 25, 26, 27, 42, 46, 47 to 51 inclusive, 53, 84, 85 and 102.
56 & 57 Vict. c. lxxxi	The Thames Watermen's and Lightermen's Act 1893	The whole act.
