= Republic (office campus) =

- Republic buildings viewed from East India DLR station

- Location within Greater London

General information
- Type: Education and Office Campus
- Location: London Borough of Tower Hamlets, London, United Kingdom, 2 Clove Crescent, London, E14 2BE, London, England
- Coordinates: 51.509943°N 0.004803°W
- Renovated: 2017

Height
- Architectural: Postmodern, Eclectic

Technical details
- Floor count: 9

Design and construction
- Architecture firm: Studio RHE
- Developer: Trilogy Real Estate

Website
- https://republic.london

Republic is an education and office campus in London, England, situated in the London Borough of Tower Hamlets, near Canary Wharf and Canning Town. It sits on the historic site of the East India Docks and is currently occupied as a multi-use innovation campus with both education and office space.

== History ==
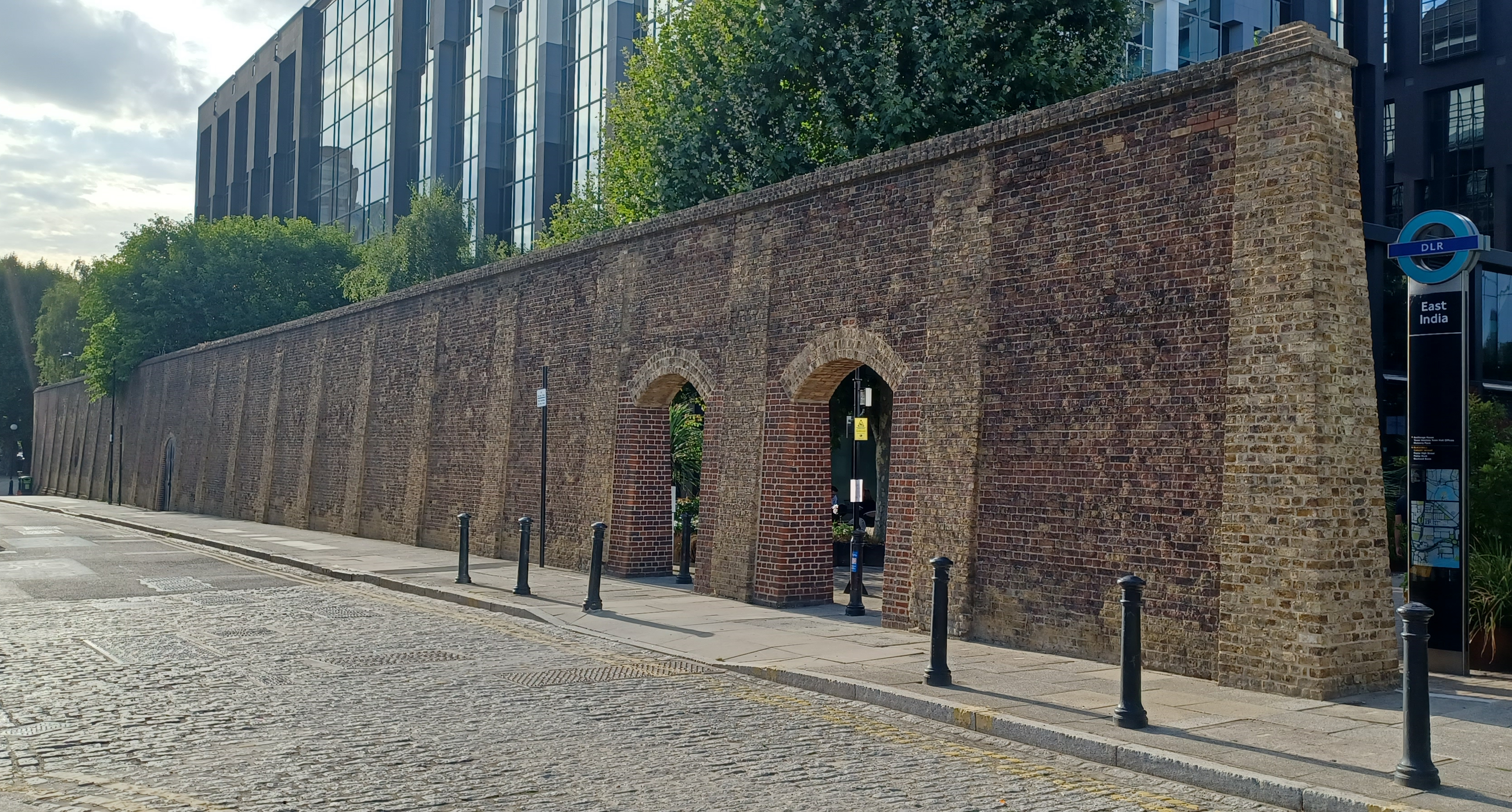
One of the entrances on the south side of the campus is through arches in the original boundary wall

The land occupied by Republic was historically used as the Import Dock of the East India Company. Following the dock's closure in 1967, the site was redeveloped in the 1990s as an office campus providing disaster recovery space for businesses at Canary Wharf.

Following the site's acquisition by LaSalle Investment Management in 2016, a large-scale re-branding effort was put in place to position the site as a cultural and business hub for East London. Recognition that businesses were increasingly being "priced-out" of the City of London and tech-capital Shoreditch motivated the site's transformation into an affordable workplace.

Signs of the historic past of the area remain, including the original boundary wall to the Import Dock and the naming of offices as The Import and Export buildings.

== Architecture ==
The Import Building at Republic

The buildings were originally constructed in the postmodern style in the 1990s and the shells of these buildings still exist. Whilst plans for the demolition of the buildings and their replacement by residential accommodation were developed by architects 3D Reid in 2015, these were not implemented by developers Trilogy Real Estate who favoured the re-positioning of the site as a "Live, Work, Play" environment.

Major renovation works, led by architects Studio RHE, began in 2016 in an attempt to modernise the campus. Extensive landscaping was instigated along existing waterways and plans submitted to construct Europe's longest open-air swimming pool.

Internal renovations of the buildings focused on the remodelling of the existing atrium cores with the extensive use of Cross-laminated timber. British artist Scott King designed the building's facade, referencing the socialist Project Cybersyn and pictorial depictions of Utopia.

== Notable tenants ==
Republic is home to a number of organisations in both the private and public sectors - These include:

University of the West of Scotland, York St John University, University of Northampton, Anglia Ruskin University, Tower Hamlets London Borough Council, Vodafone, Co-working space The Trampery and Lebara

== Transport ==
The campus is served by the East India DLR station by a dedicated entrance providing access to the Transport for London network. Nearby Canary Wharf railway station and Canning Town station facilitates connections to the wider rail network via the Elizabeth line and Jubilee line respectively.

London Buses routes D3, 108, 115, N15, N550 and N551 all stop adjacent to the site.

Additionally, the site is flanked to the south by the A261 road and to the west by the A102 road providing access to the South of London via the Blackwall Tunnel.
