= Port of London Act 1968 =

Act of the Parliament of the United Kingdom

Port of London Act 1968 (Note: Section 1.)
- Act of Parliament
- Parliament of the United Kingdom
- Long title: An Act to consolidate with amendments the statutory provisions relating to the Port of London Authority; and for other purposes.
- Citation: 1968 c. xxxii
- Territorial extent: United Kingdom

Dates
- Royal assent: 26 July 1968
- Commencement: 26 July 1968 (Note: The Acts of Parliament (Commencement) Act 1793.)
Other legislation
Amends	Port of London and Midland Railway Act 1922; See § Repealed enactments
Repeals/revokes	See § Repealed enactments
Amended by	Post Office Act 1969; Port of London Act 1970; Port of London Authority (Borrowing Powers) Revision Order 1971; Criminal Justice Act 1972; Medway Ports Authority Act 1973; Water Authorities etc. (Miscellaneous Provisions) Order 1974; Port of London Authority (Constitution) Revision Order 1975; Port of London Authority (Borrowing Powers, etc) Revision Order 1980; Port of London Act 1982; Local Government Reorganisation (Miscellaneous Provision) Order 1986; Dangerous Substances in Harbour Areas Regulations 1987; Port of Tilbury Transfer Scheme 1991 Confirmation Order 1992; Port of London Authority Harbour Revision Order 1992; Vehicle Excise and Registration Act 1994; Port of London Authority Harbour Revision Order 1999; Serious Organised Crime and Police Act 2005; Manufacture and Storage of Explosives Regulations 2005; Wireless Telegraphy Act 2006; Merchant Shipping (Inland Waterway and Limited Coastal Operations) (Boatmasters' Qualifications and Hours of Work) Regulations 2006
Relates to	Maplin Development Act 1973; London Underground Act 1992; London Docklands Railway (Lewisham) Act 1993; London Docklands Development Corporation Act 1994; British Waterways Act 1995; Barking Barrage Order 1995; Channel Tunnel Rail Link Act 1996; London Gateway Port Harbour Empowerment Order 2008

Status: Partially repealed

Text of statute as originally enacted

Revised text of statute as amended

The Port of London Act 1968 (c. xxxii) is a local act of the Parliament of the United Kingdom that consolidated, with amendments, the statutory provisions relating to the Port of London Authority.

== Provisions ==
=== Repealed enactments ===
Section 208 of the act repealed 18 enactments and revoked 15 instruments, listed in parts I and II of schedule 9 to the act, respectively.

==== Part I: Enactments repealed ====
Part I — Enactments repealed
Citation	Short title	Extent of repeal
53 & 54 Vict. c. ccxxiv	Richmond Footbridge, Sluices, Lock and Slipway Act 1890	The whole act.
8 Edw. 7. c. 68	Port of London Act 1908	The whole act.
10 & 11 Geo. 5. c. clxxiii	Port of London (Consolidation) Act 1920	The whole act.
12 & 13 Geo. 5. c. lxx	Port of London and Midland Railway Act 1922	Section 2. The words from " The Lands Clauses Acts " to " the expression ' the centre of the railway ' shall mean the landing stage works ".
12 & 13 Geo. 5. c. lxx	Port of London and Midland Railway Act 1922	Section 3.
12 & 13 Geo. 5. c. lxx	Port of London and Midland Railway Act 1922	Section 4. In subsection (1) the words " the Port Authority or " and the words " as the case may require ".
12 & 13 Geo. 5. c. lxx	Port of London and Midland Railway Act 1922	Section 5.
12 & 13 Geo. 5. c. lxx	Port of London and Midland Railway Act 1922	Section 8.
12 & 13 Geo. 5. c. lxx	Port of London and Midland Railway Act 1922	Section 12.
12 & 13 Geo. 5. c. lxx	Port of London and Midland Railway Act 1922	Section 14.
12 & 13 Geo. 5. c. lxx	Port of London and Midland Railway Act 1922	Section 16. The words " and at or near the Port Authority's portion of the landing stage ".
12 & 13 Geo. 5. c. lxx	Port of London and Midland Railway Act 1922	Section 22.
12 & 13 Geo. 5. c. lxx	Port of London and Midland Railway Act 1922	Section 23.
12 & 13 Geo. 5. c. lxx	Port of London and Midland Railway Act 1922	Section 24.
12 & 13 Geo. 5. c. lxx	Port of London and Midland Railway Act 1922	Section 25.
12 & 13 Geo. 5. c. lxx	Port of London and Midland Railway Act 1922	Section 26.
12 & 13 Geo. 5. c. lxx	Port of London and Midland Railway Act 1922	Section 27.
12 & 13 Geo. 5. c. lxx	Port of London and Midland Railway Act 1922	Section 28.
12 & 13 Geo. 5. c. lxx	Port of London and Midland Railway Act 1922	Section 29.
12 & 13 Geo. 5. c. lxx	Port of London and Midland Railway Act 1922	Section 30.
12 & 13 Geo. 5. c. lxx	Port of London and Midland Railway Act 1922	Section 31.
12 & 13 Geo. 5. c. lxx	Port of London and Midland Railway Act 1922	Section 32.
12 & 13 Geo. 5. c. lxx	Port of London and Midland Railway Act 1922	Section 33.
12 & 13 Geo. 5. c. lxx	Port of London and Midland Railway Act 1922	Section 34.
12 & 13 Geo. 5. c. lxx	Port of London and Midland Railway Act 1922	Section 35.
12 & 13 Geo. 5. c. lxx	Port of London and Midland Railway Act 1922	Section 36.
12 & 13 Geo. 5. c. lxx	Port of London and Midland Railway Act 1922	Section 37.
12 & 13 Geo. 5. c. lxx	Port of London and Midland Railway Act 1922	Section 39.
12 & 13 Geo. 5. c. lxx	Port of London and Midland Railway Act 1922	Section 40. (a) In the list of marginal notes, the marginal notes " Deviation " and from " Penalty for obstructing works " to " Power to sell materials " inclusive. (b) The words " road diversion or ", " or the extension of the floating landing stage " and " as the case may require ". (c) The words from " but nothing contained " to the end of the section.
12 & 13 Geo. 5. c. lxx	Port of London and Midland Railway Act 1922	Section 41.
12 & 13 Geo. 5. c. lxx	Port of London and Midland Railway Act 1922	Section 42.
12 & 13 Geo. 5. c. lxx	Port of London and Midland Railway Act 1922	Section 43.
12 & 13 Geo. 5. c. lxx	Port of London and Midland Railway Act 1922	Section 44.
12 & 13 Geo. 5. c. lxx	Port of London and Midland Railway Act 1922	Section 47(1).
12 & 13 Geo. 5. c. lxx	Port of London and Midland Railway Act 1922	Section 49.
12 & 13 Geo. 5. c. lxx	Port of London and Midland Railway Act 1922	Section 51.
12 & 13 Geo. 5. c. lxx	Port of London and Midland Railway Act 1922	Section 52.
12 & 13 Geo. 5. c. lxx	Port of London and Midland Railway Act 1922	Section 57.
12 & 13 Geo. 5. c. lxx	Port of London and Midland Railway Act 1922	Section 58.
18 & 19 Geo. 5. c. xlvii	Port of London Act 1928	The whole act.
22 & 23 Geo. 5. c. xxxviii	Port of London (Various Powers) Act 1932	The whole act.
25 & 26 Geo. 5. c. cxvi	Port of London Act 1935	The whole act.
14 Geo. 6. c. xxiii	Port of London Act 1950	The whole act.
5 & 6 Eliz. 2. c. v	Port of London Act 1957	The whole act.
6 & 7 Eliz. 2. c. xiii	Port of London (Superannuation) Act 1958	The whole act.
7 & 8 Eliz. 2. c. xxviii	Port of London Act 1959	The whole act.
9 & 10 Eliz. 2. c. xli	Port of London Act 1961	The whole act.
10 & 11 Eliz. 2. c. li	Port of London Act 1962	The whole act.
1963 c. xxvii	Port of London Act 1963	The whole act.
1964 c. ii	Port of London (Extension of Seaward Limit) Act 1964	The whole act.
1964 c. xxxvi	Port of London Act 1964	The whole act.
1965 c. vii	Port of London Act 1965	The whole act.
1967 c. xxxii	Port of London Act 1967	The whole act.

==== Part II: Orders revoked ====
Part II — Orders revoked
Citation		Description	Extent of revocation
SR&O 1913/954	N/A	Regulations relating to applications for orders	The whole order.
SR&O 1921/1700	Port of London Stock Regulations 1921	The Port of London Stock Regulations 1921	Articles 3 and 52.
SR&O 1921/1762	N/A	Regulations relating to formation of register of electors of the Port Authority's elected members	The whole order.
SR&O 1921/1763	N/A	Regulations as to method of election of the Port Authority's elected members	The whole order.
SR&O 1927/1216	N/A	Order applying the schedule of standard charges of the London and North Eastern Railway Company to the Port Authority	The whole order.
SR&O 1929/212	N/A	Regulations relating to the accounts of the Port Authority	The whole order.
SR&O 1933/329	N/A	Regulations relating to the accounts of the Port Authority	The whole order.
N/A	Port of London (Charges for use of Moorings) Order 1941	The Port of London (Charges for use of Moorings) Order 1941	The whole order.
SR&O 1943/1326	N/A	Order relating to the accounts of the Port Authority	The whole order.
SI 1965/654	London Government Order 1965	The London Government Order 1965	Article 3(23).
SI 1966/1251	Port of London Act 1964 (Commencement etc.) Order 1966	The Port of London Act 1964 (Commencement etc.) Order 1966	The whole order.
SI 1967/168	Port of London (Craft and Boat Registration) Revision Order 1966	The Port of London (Craft and Boat Registration) Revision Order 1966	The whole order.
SI 1967/1197	Port of London Authority Revision Order 1967	The Port of London Authority Revision Order 1967	The whole order.
SI 1967/1813	Port of London Authority (Financial Provisions) Revision Order 1967	The Port of London Authority (Financial Provisions) Revision Order 1967	The whole order.
SI 1968/738	Port of London Act 1964 (Second Appointed Date) Order 1968	The Port of London Act 1964 (Second Appointed Date) Order 1968	The whole order.
