= Port of Tilbury =

Port on the River Thames at Tilbury in Essex, England

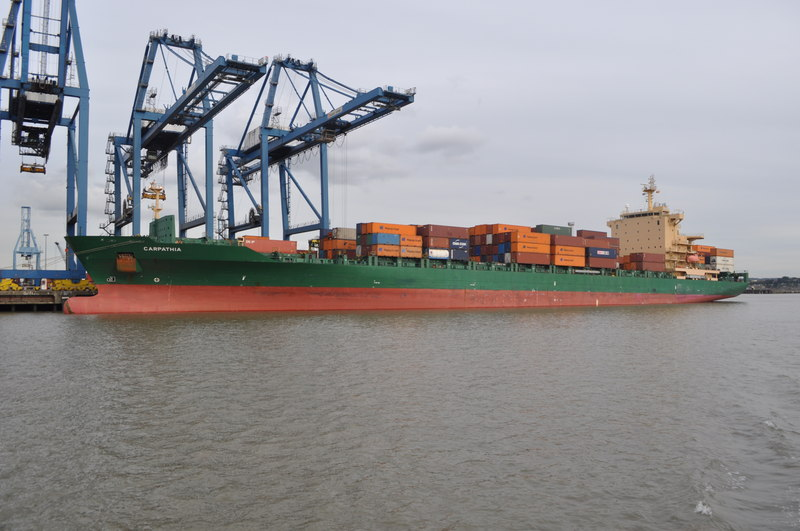
- Container ship Carpathia unloading at Northfleet Hope terminal
- Interactive map of Port of Tilbury

Location
- Country: UK
- Location: Tilbury, Essex
- Coordinates: 51.46°N 0.345°E

Details
- Opened: 1886
- Owned by: Forth Ports
- No. of berths: 56

Statistics
- Website https://forthports.co.uk/tilbury-london/

Port of Tilbury
- Location within Essex
- OS grid reference: TQ639761
- Unitary authority: Thurrock
- Ceremonial county: Essex
- Region: East
- Country: England
- Sovereign state: United Kingdom
- Police: Essex
- Fire: Essex
- Ambulance: East of England

The Port of Tilbury is a port located on the River Thames at Tilbury in Essex, England. It serves as the principal port for London, as well as being the main United Kingdom port for handling the importation of paper. There are extensive facilities for shipping containers, grain, and other bulk cargoes. There are also facilities for the importation of cars. It forms part of the wider Port of London.

== Geography ==
The Port of Tilbury lies on the north shore of the River Thames, 25 miles (40 km) downstream of London Bridge, at a point where the river makes a loop southwards, and where its width narrows to 800 yards (730 m). The loop is part of the Thames lower reaches: within the meander was a huge area of marshland. Gravesend on the opposite shore had long been a port of entry for shipping, all of which had used the river itself for loading and unloading of cargo and passengers. There was also a naval dockyard at Northfleet at the mouth of the Ebbsfleet River. The new deep-water docks were an extension of all that maritime activity. The original docks consisted of a tidal basin on Gravesend Reach opposite Northfleet, connected by a lock to a main dock with three side branches named East, Central, and West Branch docks. Between the tidal basin and Main Dock were two dry docks.

== History ==
=== Construction ===
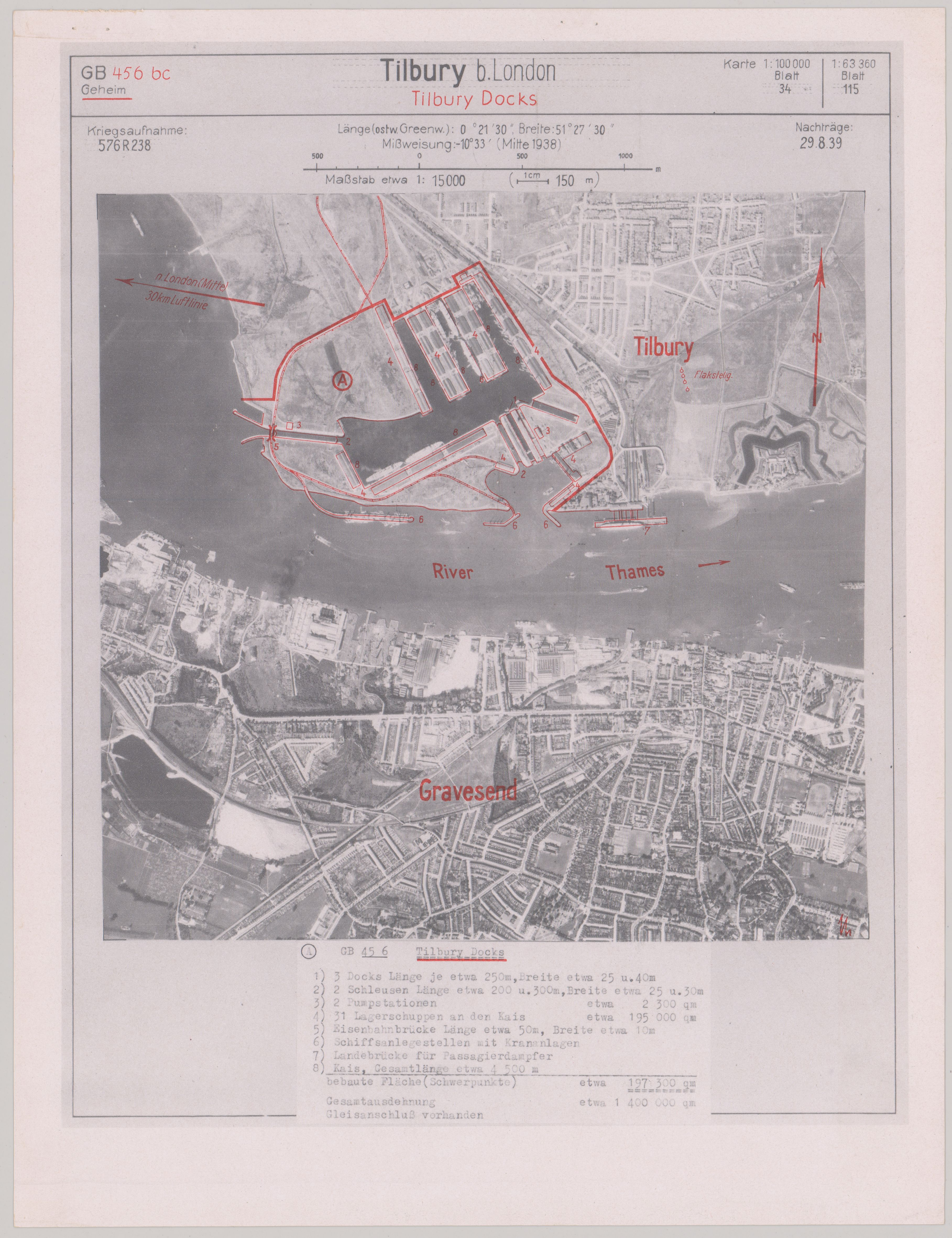
Tilbury Docks on a target dossier of the German Luftwaffe, 1939

The original docks of London, all built close to the City, were opened in stages by what were to become the East and West India Dock Company (E&WIDC) and the London and Saint Katharine Docks Company (L&StKDC) at the beginning of the 19th century. With the coming of the railways and increasing ship size, proximity to the centre of London became less important than access to deep water, unrestricted sites, and reduction in time spent traveling up the winding Thames.

The E&WIDC had long been in competition with its rival, the L&StKDC. The opening of the Royal Albert Dock by the L&StKDC, with its deepwater quayage, in 1880 had given access to the Thames at Gallions Reach, 11 miles (18 km) by river below London Bridge and downstream of the then principal London docks.

East and West India Dock Company's Extension Act 1882 (Note: Section 1.)
- Act of Parliament
- Parliament of the United Kingdom
- Long title: An Act to authorise the East and West India Dock Company to extend their Dock system by constructing and maintaining a new Dock and other Works in connexion therewith in the parishes of Grays Thurrock, Little Thurrock, and Chadwell, all in the County of Essex.
- Citation: 45 & 46 Vict. c. xc
- Territorial extent: United Kingdom

Dates
- Royal assent: 3 July 1882
- Commencement: 3 July 1882 (Note: The Acts of Parliament (Commencement) Act 1793.)
- Repealed: 23 December 1920
Other legislation
Amended by	East and West India Dock Company's Act 1885
Repealed by	Port of London (Consolidation) Act 1920

Status: Repealed

Text of statute as originally enacted

East and West India Dock Company's Act 1885
- Act of Parliament
- Parliament of the United Kingdom
- Long title: An Act to authorise the East and West India Dock Company to raise by capital stock or to borrow on mortgage, or by redeemable debenture stock, the moneys which they are authorised to raise by their Act of 1882, and which have not yet been raised.
- Citation: 48 & 49 Vict. c. xxv
- Territorial extent: United Kingdom

Dates
- Royal assent: 21 May 1885
- Commencement: 21 May 1885
- Repealed: 23 December 1920
Other legislation
Amends	East and West India Dock Company's Extension Act 1882
Repealed by	Port of London (Consolidation) Act 1920

Status: Repealed

Text of statute as originally enacted

The E&WIDC were forced to retaliate, and obtained the East and West India Dock Company's Extension Act 1882 (45 & 46 Vict. c. xc) to allowed them to construct docks at Tilbury. The construction encountered difficulties when the contractors, Kirk & Randell, unexpectedly encountered blue clay and claimed extra costs. The company had them ejected from the site in 1884, triggering expensive legal action. For a while the East and West India Dock Company continued construction with their own workers until the firm of Lucas and Aird was engaged to complete the work. The first vessel entered the docks on 17 April 1886. This was the Glenfruin carrying the official party for the opening ceremony. The opening of the dock took place at the beginning of the steamship era, and its location soon proved to be advantageous.

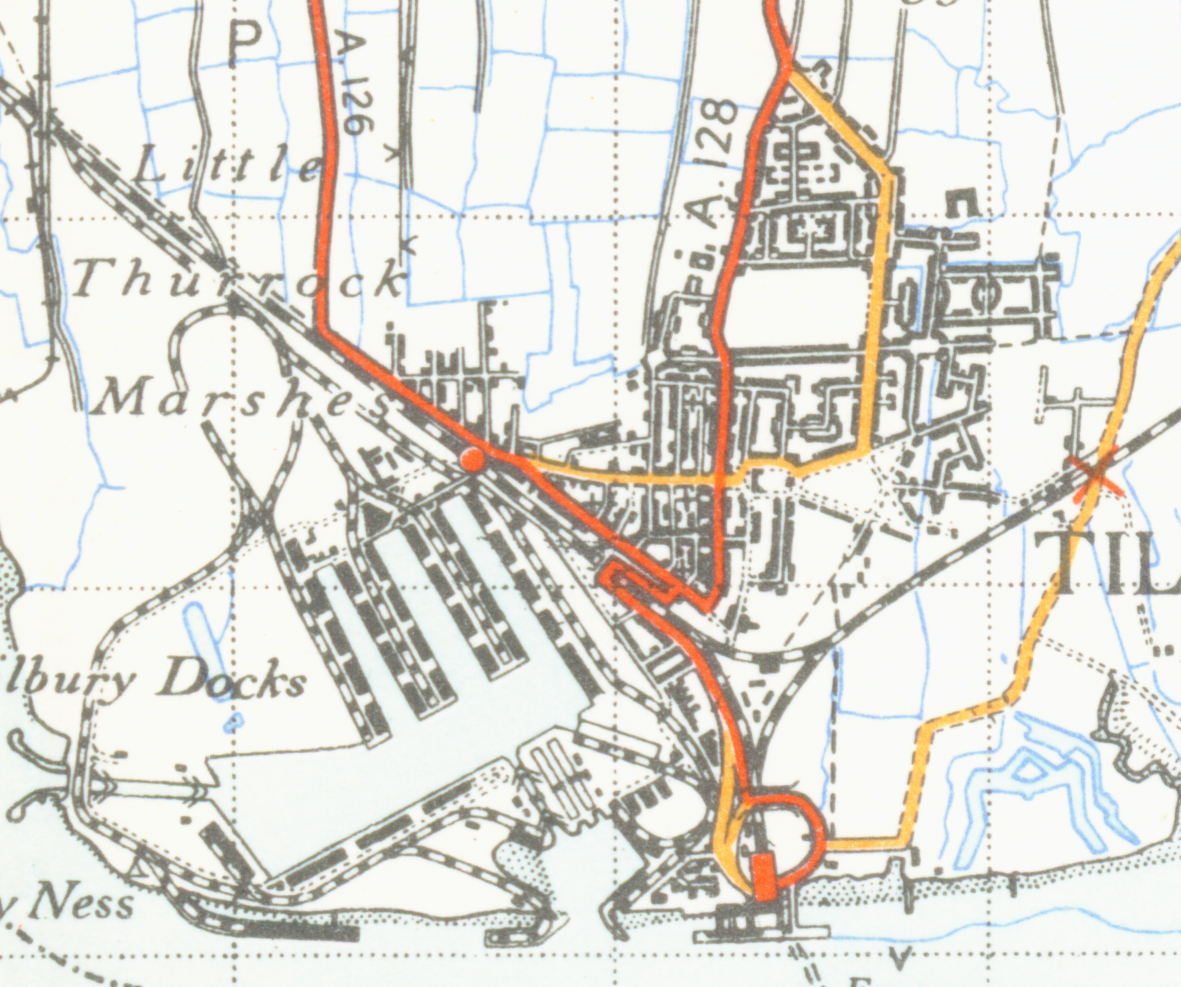
A map of the town from 1946

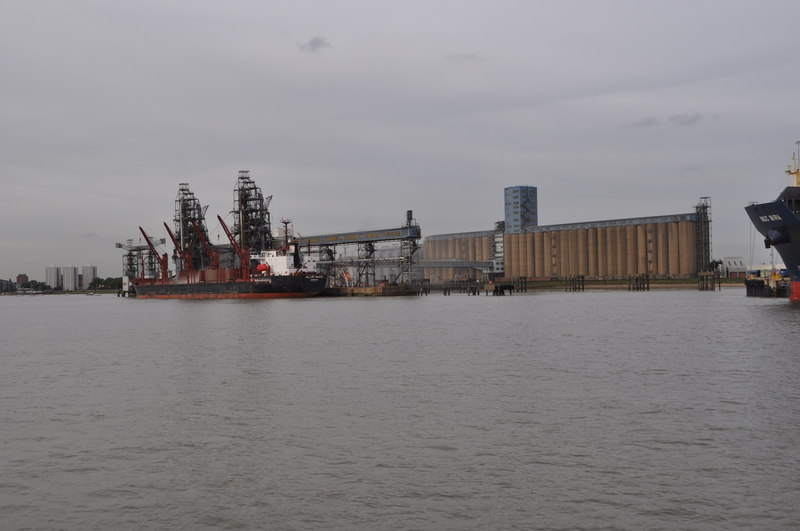
Ship discharging at Tilbury Grain Terminal

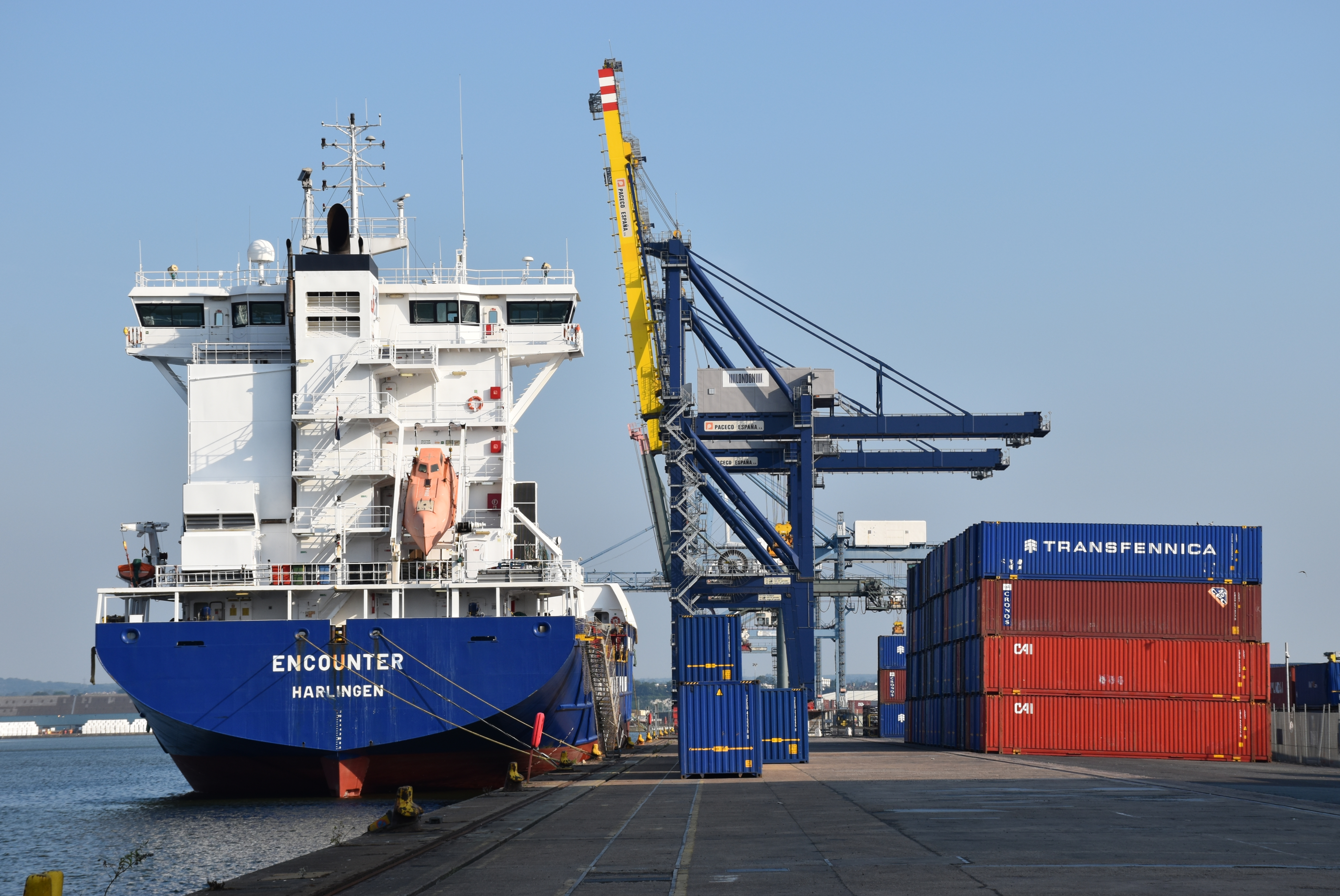
Tilbury Docks, June 2017

=== Docks expansion ===
In 1909 Tilbury, along with the upstream docks, became part of the newly established Port of London Authority (PLA).

In 1921, and again in 1929, the PLA carried out major improvements. These included a new lock 1,000 feet (300 m) long and 110 ft (34 m) wide, linking the docks directly to the Thames to the west at Northfleet Hope, and a third dry dock, 752 feet (229 m) long and 110 feet (34 m) wide. These works were carried out by Sir Robert McAlpine.

During the 1960s, at the time when the upstream docks were closing, the PLA further extended the Tilbury dock facilities. Between 1963 and 1966 a huge fourth branch dock, running north from Main Dock for nearly 1 mile (1.6 km), was constructed. The tidal basin was closed and eventually filled in. In 1969 a £6 million riverside grain terminal on Northfleet Hope was brought into use.

The PLA funded a new £30 million container port which opened in 1967. Labour issues prevented full service from starting until April 1970, although United States Lines reached an agreement with the union to begin service in 1968.

Near the Dockmaster's office, on New Lock, is a memorial to Captain Peter de Neumann, GM, who was killed there in an accident on 16 September 1972. In 1978, a deepwater riverside berth was opened for large container ships on reclaimed land at Northfleet Hope.

In 1992 the port was privatised and became part of the Forth Ports organisation, the PLA retaining the role of managing the tidal Thames.

Rolf Harris visited the docks in 2004 during a TV episode of Rolf on Art, when he recreated J. M. W. Turner's famous painting The Fighting Temeraire.

On 25 January 2012, Otter Ports Holdings, owner of Forth Ports, acquired from DP World and Associated British Ports the 67% ownership of Tilbury Container Services (TCS) not already owned by Forth Ports in a cash transaction. Forth Ports had been a one third shareholder in TCS since 1998 along with partners DP World and Associated British Ports. TCS is located within the Port of Tilbury, which is wholly owned by Forth Ports.

In October 2019, 39 people were found dead in a truck at nearby Grays. The truck was moved to the Port of Tilbury the next day, so that more investigations could be undertaken. After that, the bodies were moved to Broomfield Hospital.

Port of Tilbury recently announced a joint development with Tarmac, a partnership which will see the UK's largest construction materials aggregates terminal (CMAT) built on a 152-acre (62-hectare) site. The joint development of the CMAT is expected to see most operations established by the end of 2020.

The Port is actively exploring and implementing shore-power solutions to reduce emissions from ships while docked. This includes a new development, Tilbury2, which is shore-side power enabled. Additionally, the port is working with RWE and Mitsui to investigate green hydrogen for port operations, potentially transitioning from fossil fuels to hydrogen for port equipment and exploring a 10 MW green hydrogen plant.

== London Cruise Terminal ==
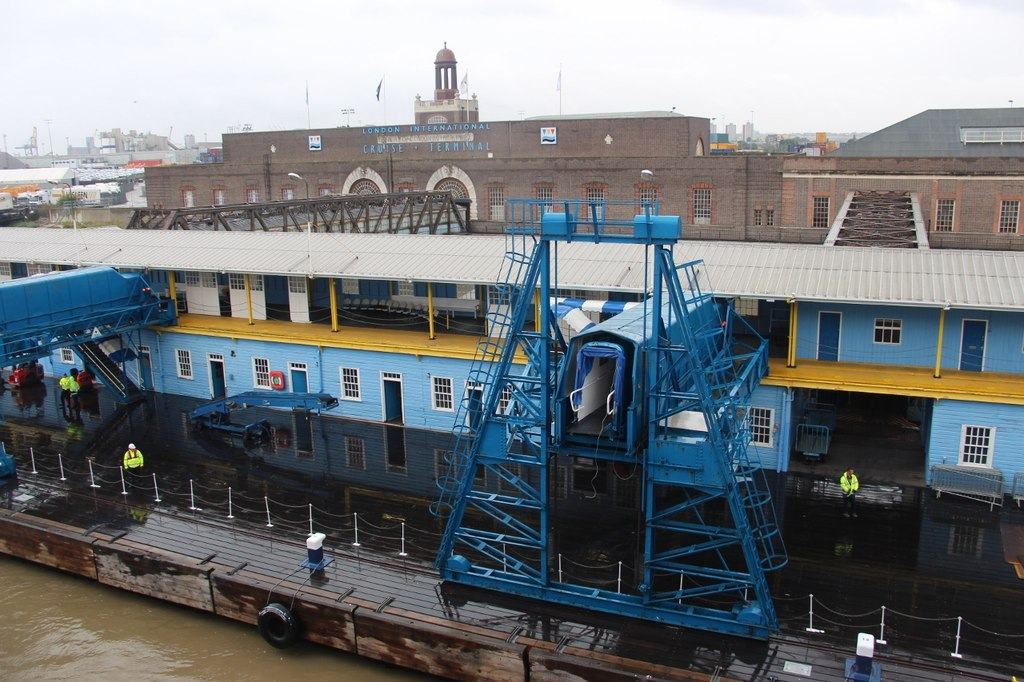
Tilbury International Cruise Terminal, viewed from the water in 2015

One of the shipping lines using the docks was P&O. Tilbury became the only port in the PLA to serve ocean liners, when, in 1916, it opened berths specifically for the P&O within the dock complex. With the need for expanded facilities, a large new passenger landing stage was constructed in the Thames jointly by the PLA and the London Midland & Scottish Railway, with rail connections. It was opened in May 1930 by Ramsay MacDonald.

Tilbury operated as London's passenger liner passenger terminal until the 1960s. For many people, Tilbury was their point of emigration to Australia under an assisted-passage scheme established and operated by the Australian Government. The Ten Pound Poms, as they were known in Australia, embarked on to ships such as RMS Mooltan and set off for a new life. At the end of the Second World War, displaced people from the Baltic countries who were in camps in Germany began to arrive. The first of these came to Tilbury in 1946. These were over 1000 Baltic women who were recruited under a British government scheme named Balt Cygnets. These women would work in hospitals and tuberculosis sanatoria. The ship on which they travelled—the Empire Halladale—was used to transport British Military families from Tilbury in 1946 under Operation Union to Germany. They would join serving soldiers of the British Army of the Rhine.

Tilbury was also a port of entry for many immigrants; among them was a large group of West Indians on HMT Empire Windrush in 1948.

The passenger landing stage was reopened by the Port of Tilbury group, as the London Cruise Terminal in 1995. The historic passenger terminal building has been rebuilt and refurbished over the subsequent years and is now called the London International Cruise Terminal. The old station building (no longer served by a railway connection) has been refurbished to house a new luggage retrieval hall.

The cruise terminal is the main port for the Ambassador Cruise Line.

== Other port activities ==
The Port of Tilbury Police, among the oldest of such forces in the UK, are responsible for the security of the Port.

The port is also a base of operations of Thurrock Sea Cadets, who operate out of TS Iveston (a Coniston-class former minesweeper).

Apostleship of the Sea, which provides practical and pastoral support to seafarers, has a port chaplain based at the port.

== Railways in the Port of Tilbury ==
The Port of Tilbury had a rail connection of what was the London Tilbury and Southend Railway's (LT&SR) main line to Southend and Tilbury. This was located at Tilbury North Junction, which lay between Grays and Tilbury Dock and opened on the same day as the docks – 17 April 1886.

The connection passed through a pair of high-security gates and then fanned out into a series of exchange sidings that were controlled by a dock company signal box. When the docks were being built, the contractors had laid a number of railway lines that formed the basis of the dock system. On opening, some of the contractor's locomotives were purchased by the London and Saint Katharine Docks Company.

A second rail connection was provided from Tilbury to a station called Tilbury Tidal Basin, which opened on 17 April 1886 by the London and Saint Katharine Docks Company. This could also be reached via the Tilbury North Junction and a line via the east side of the docks. Its only passenger services were boat trains connecting with liners using the basin. The service was not successful, and after December 1906, passenger traffic instead ran to Tilbury Riverside. The station was then used for goods traffic.

In the early years, goods traffic was low, which was a disappointment for the LT&SR board, who had been hoping the docks would be a big boost to its income.

Boat trains from Liverpool Street, Fenchurch Street, and later St Pancras all worked into the port area via the Tilbury North connection and would work through to the relevant transit shed, all of which were equipped with passenger platforms. In the early years the dock-company locomotives would work these, but it was felt it was easier to work the main line engines with a dock-company pilot driver.

15 May 1927 saw the commencement of an LMS boat train service to Tilbury Marine railway station, which was on the site of the old Tidal Basin station. The service offered one through train from London to Dunkirk each way, with connecting coaches to Manchester and Bradford. Traffic was reasonable in the summer but poor in the winter, and it was decided to withdraw the service, with the last train running on 30 April 1932 and the Tilbury Marine closing the following day.

In 1957, a new station called No. 1 Berth Passenger Terminal was opened with a terminal building. The Orient Line was the main user of the terminal and started operated in June 1957. The rise of air travel saw this facility little used, and it fell into disuse.

By the 1960s, traditional traffic to the docks was in decline, and the Port of London Authority were looking to convert the docks to container operation. A rail-connected container terminal was built by the reception sidings and opened in April 1968. A grain terminal was opened in the docks called Northfleet Hope in 1969, and the container berths were rail-served.

=== Engine Shed and locomotives ===
A three-road engine shed was built in 1886 and was where the dock-systems locomotives were maintained. It was located south of the exchange sidings and close to Tilbury Dock station. The brick shed had been built on marshy ground and by 1935 had to be rebuilt.

When the docks opened in 1886, six contractor's locomotives were taken over by the docks committee, consisting of four Manning Wardle and two Hunslet steam locomotives. All were 0-6-0ST locomotives. These were withdrawn between 1904 and 1917, with some being scrapped and others being sold for further use.

The next four locomotives were also 0-6-0STs, this time produced by Robert Stephenson and Company, which were introduced between 1901 and 1907 and scrapped between 1934 and 1938. Two of these were scrapped and two of these sold.

After the PLA took over, one Hunslet (purchased 1911) and three Hudswell Clarke locomotives which were purchased in 1915. During World War II, the Hunslet and one of the Hudswell Clarke locomotives worked on the Manchester Ship Canal railway system, returning in 1946. The Hunslet was withdrawn in 1952 and the Hudswell Clarkes in 1954 and 1959.

Further new steam engines bought for the dock were two Hawthorn Leslie 0-6-0Ts, which were introduced in 1922 and worked until 1956 and 1960. World War II saw two Hunslet Austerity 0-6-0STs owned by the War Department working at Tilbury, and these were introduced in 1944 and purchased by the PLA in 1947. Both lasted until 1960 and were sold to the National Coal Board for use at Ashington Colliery in Northumberland.

As late as 1954, the PLA purchased two further Hudswell Clark 0-6-0Ts, but dieselisation at Tilbury saw them transferred to other PLA docks before withdrawal and scrapping in 1963.

The PLA chose diesel locomotives made by the Yorkshire Engine Company (YEC) to replace the aging steam fleet at Tilbury during 1959–60. These consisted of six Janus-class 0-6-0 shunters and 3 other YEC shunters. The first arrived in October 1959 and all were withdrawn when the PLA stopped working rail traffic in 1970. All were sold onto other industrial users and with one exception have since been scrapped. One of the Janus locomotive survives and in 2011 was reported stored at Emborough Quarries. However it has since been reported at a scrap yard in Attercliffe, where it is a spares donor for a sister locomotive.

== Tilbury Docks in film ==
The Docks were used as the setting of John Wayne's smuggler-busting operation in Brannigan (1975). The Docks stood in for Venetian waterways during the boat-chase scene in Indiana Jones and the Last Crusade (1989).

A scene from the Jude Law film Alfie (2004) was filmed there, as were scenes from Batman Begins (2005). In Paddington (2014), the scene where Paddington arrives on a boat was filmed at the Port of Tilbury. Solo: A Star Wars Story was filmed at London Container Terminal and Grain Terminal.

== Sources ==
Weinreb, Ben; Hibbert, Christopher; Keay, John; Keay, Julia, eds. (2008) [1983]. The London Encyclopaedia (Third ed.). Macmillan. ISBN 978-1-405-04924-5.
