= Port of London Authority =

Port authority in the United Kingdom

- Logo

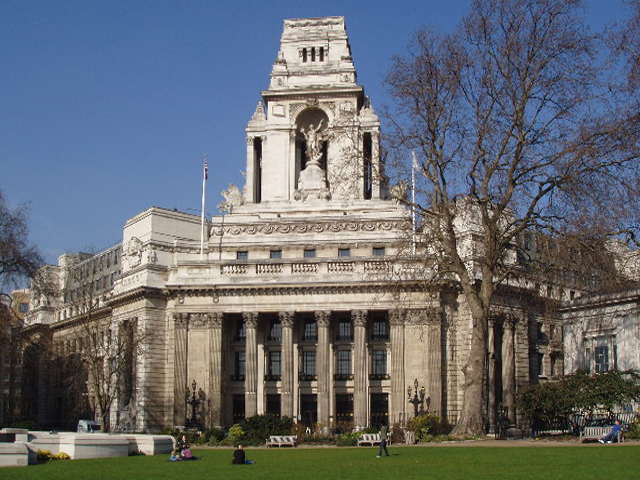
- Former headquarters, Tower Hill
- Predecessor: Thames Conservancy; London and India Docks Company; Surrey Commercial Dock Company; Millwall Dock Company
- Formation: 31 March 1909; 117 years ago
- Type: Public trust
- Headquarters: London River House
- Location: Gravesend
- Coordinates: 51°26′41″N 0°22′26″E
- Region served: Kent
- Field: Operation of the Port of London
- Chair: Jonson Cox CBE
- Chief Executive: Robin Mortimer
- Staff: 480 (2026)
- Website: pla.co.uk

The Port of London Authority (PLA) is a self-funding public trust established on 1909 in accordance with the Port of London Act 1908 to govern the Port of London. Its responsibility extends over the Tideway of the River Thames and its continuation (the Kent/Essex strait). It maintains and supervises navigation, and protects the river's environment.

== History ==
Until the Port of London Authority was established, the East India Docks, the West India Docks, the London Docks, the Millwall Dock, the St Katharine Docks, the Surrey Commercial Docks, the Royal Albert Dock and the Royal Victoria Dock were managed by three companies across five systems. Before the PLA was established, conservation of the tidal Thames had been managed by the Corporation of London from 1774 to 1857, when this function was transferred to the Thames Conservancy through the Thames Conservancy Act 1857.

The three companies managing the Port of London had faced significant financial difficulties since the 1880s. In 1902, a royal commission recommended the establishment of a port authority to manage all docks in London.

In 1903, the Conservative government announced the establishment of the Port of London Authority in that year's King's Speech, however it did not proceed to introduce a bill to create the PLA. Certain bodies including the London & India Docks, the Thames the Conservancy and the London County Council promoted alternative private bills, with another private bill being to amalgamate the London & India and Millwall companies.

The PLA was established by the Port of London Act 1908 (8 Edw. 7. c. 68), an act of the Parliament of the United Kingdom, on 31 March 1909. The PLA became responsible for East India Docks, the West India Docks, the Millwall Dock, the St Katharine Docks, the Surrey Commercial Docks, the Royal Albert Dock and the Royal Victoria Dock. The PLA took over responsibility for conserving the tidal Thames. It inherited the three private police forces of the companies which had previously run the docks, reorganising them into a single Port of London Authority Police in 1912.

The PLA originally operated all enclosed dock systems on the river (except the Regent's Canal Dock).

The Port of London (Consolidation) Act 1920 (10 & 11 Geo. 5. c. clxxiii) was a local act of the Parliament of the United Kingdom, which consolidated legislation relating to the port. The act allowed the authority to choose its own chairman and vice-chairman without either necessarily being a member of the authority.

Port of London Act 1968 (Note: Section 1.)
- Act of Parliament
- Parliament of the United Kingdom
- Long title: An Act to consolidate with amendments the statutory provisions relating to the Port of London Authority; and for other purposes.
- Citation: 1968 c. xxxii
- Territorial extent: United Kingdom

Dates
- Royal assent: 26 July 1968
- Repealed: 26 July 1968 (Note: The Acts of Parliament (Commencement) Act 1793.)
Other legislation
| Amends | Port of London and Midland Railway Act 1922 |
| Repeals/revokes | Richmond Footbridge Sluices, Lock and Slipway Act 1890; Port of London Act 1908; SR&O 1913/954; Port of London (Consolidation) Act 1920; SR&O 1921/1700; SR&O 1921/1762; SR&O 1921/1763; SR&O 1927/1216; Port of London Act 1928; SR&O 1929/212; Port of London (Various Powers) Act 1932; SR&O 1933/329; Port of London Act 1935; SR&O 1943/1326; Port of London Act 1950; Port of London Act 1957; Port of London (Superannuation) Act 1958; Port of London Act 1959; Port of London Act 1961; Port of London Act 1962; Port of London Act 1963; Port of London (Extension of Seaward Limit) Act 1964; Port of London Act 1964; Port of London Act 1965; London Government Order 1965; Port of London Act 1964 (Commencement etc.) Order 1966; Port of London Act 1967; Port of London (Craft and Boat Registration) Order 1967; Port of London Authority Revision Order 1967; Port of London Authority (Financial Provisions) Revision Order 1967; Port of London Act, 1964 (Second Appointed Date) Order 1968 |
| Amended by | Post Office Act 1969; Port of London Act 1970; Port of London Authority (Borrowing Powers) Revision Order 1971; Criminal Justice Act 1972; Medway Ports Authority Act 1973; Water Authorities etc. (Miscellaneous Provisions) Order 1974; Port of London Authority (Constitution) Revision Order 1975; Port of London Authority (Borrowing Powers, etc) Revision Order 1980; Port of London Act 1982; Local Government Reorganisation (Miscellaneous Provision) Order 1986; Dangerous Substances in Harbour Areas Regulations 1987; Port of Tilbury Transfer Scheme 1991 Confirmation Order 1992; Port of London Authority Harbour Revision Order 1992; Vehicle Excise and Registration Act 1994; Port of London Authority Harbour Revision Order 1999; Serious Organised Crime and Police Act 2005; Wireless Telegraphy Act 2006; Merchant Shipping (Inland Waterway and Limited Coastal Operations) (Boatmasters' Qualifications and Hours of Work) Regulations 2006 |
| Relates to | Maplin Development Act 1973; London Underground Act 1992; London Docklands Railway (Lewisham) Act 1993; London Docklands Development Corporation Act 1994; British Waterways Act 1995; Barking Barrage Order 1995; Channel Tunnel Rail Link Act 1996; London Gateway Port Harbour Empowerment Order 2008 |

Status: Amended

Text of statute as originally enacted

Revised text of statute as amended

The Port of London Act 1968 (c. xxxii) is a local act of the Parliament of the United Kingdom, which further consolidated legislation relating to the port, including powers concerning pollution control.

The Port of London (Financial Assistance) Act 1980 (c. 31) gave the Port of London Authority a payment of £70 million in order to help them return to profitability.

The dock systems have long been closed to commercial traffic, with the exception of Port of Tilbury, which was privatised in 1992 through a management buyout.

== Finance ==
The PLA receives no funding from the government and is entirely self-financing. Revenues are raised from conservancy charges on vessels and cargo, pilotage charges, annual port dues, hydrographic services, river works licence fees and charges for other services.

== Limits ==
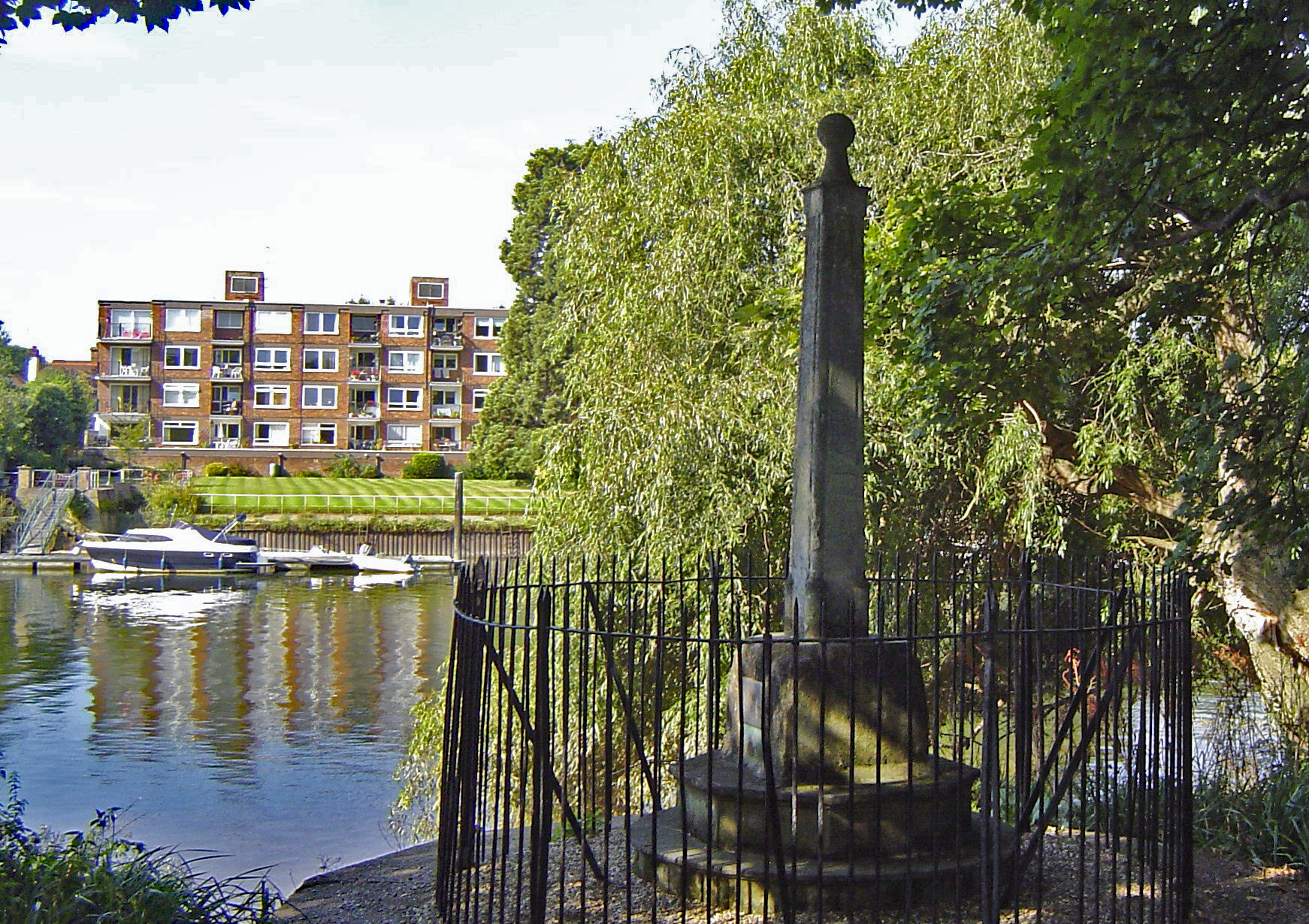
PLA boundary marker opposite Teddington

The PLA's responsibility extends from a point marked by an obelisk just downstream of Teddington Lock (the upstream limit of the tidal river) to the end of the Kent/Essex strait of the North Sea (between Margate to the south and Gunfleet Lighthouse, near Frinton-on-Sea, to the north,) a total of about 95 miles (150 km). The PLA does not cover the Medway or the Swale.

From the City of London, via the Thames Conservancy, the PLA inherited the conservancy, management and control of the river instead of ownership of the bed of the river and foreshore (the Crown was prohibited from alienating any of its lands by section 5 of the Crown Lands Act 1702; the Crown was presumed to own the bed of Thames and 'as conservators' the City of London were prohibited from owning any part of that same river bed) from Teddington to the Yantlet Line (between Southend and Grain).

During much of the 20th century the PLA owned and operated many of the docks and wharfs in the port, but they have all now been either closed or privatised. Today the PLA acts mainly as a managing authority for the tidal stretch of the River Thames, ensuring safe navigation, and the well-being of the port and its activities. Comparable responsibilities for the river including, and upstream of, Teddington Lock fall to the Environment Agency.

The PLA today has a number of statutory duties, including river traffic control, security, navigational safety (including pilotage, buoys, beacons, bridge lights and channel surveys), conservation (including dredging and maintaining certain river banks), encouraging both commercial and leisure uses of the river, and protecting its environment. The PLA is responsible for the operation of Richmond Lock, but not for the Thames Barrier which is managed by the Environment Agency in its flood management role.

== Harbour masters ==
The PLA's navigational safety team is headed by a Chief Harbour Master who has overall responsibility for defining and enforcing the regulations needed to support and manage the safety of navigation within the PLA's limits. Given the extensive length of river covered by the PLA, day-to-day management of the river is overseen by a team of harbour masters who cover the entirety of the river between Teddington Lock and the outer estuary.

== Centres ==
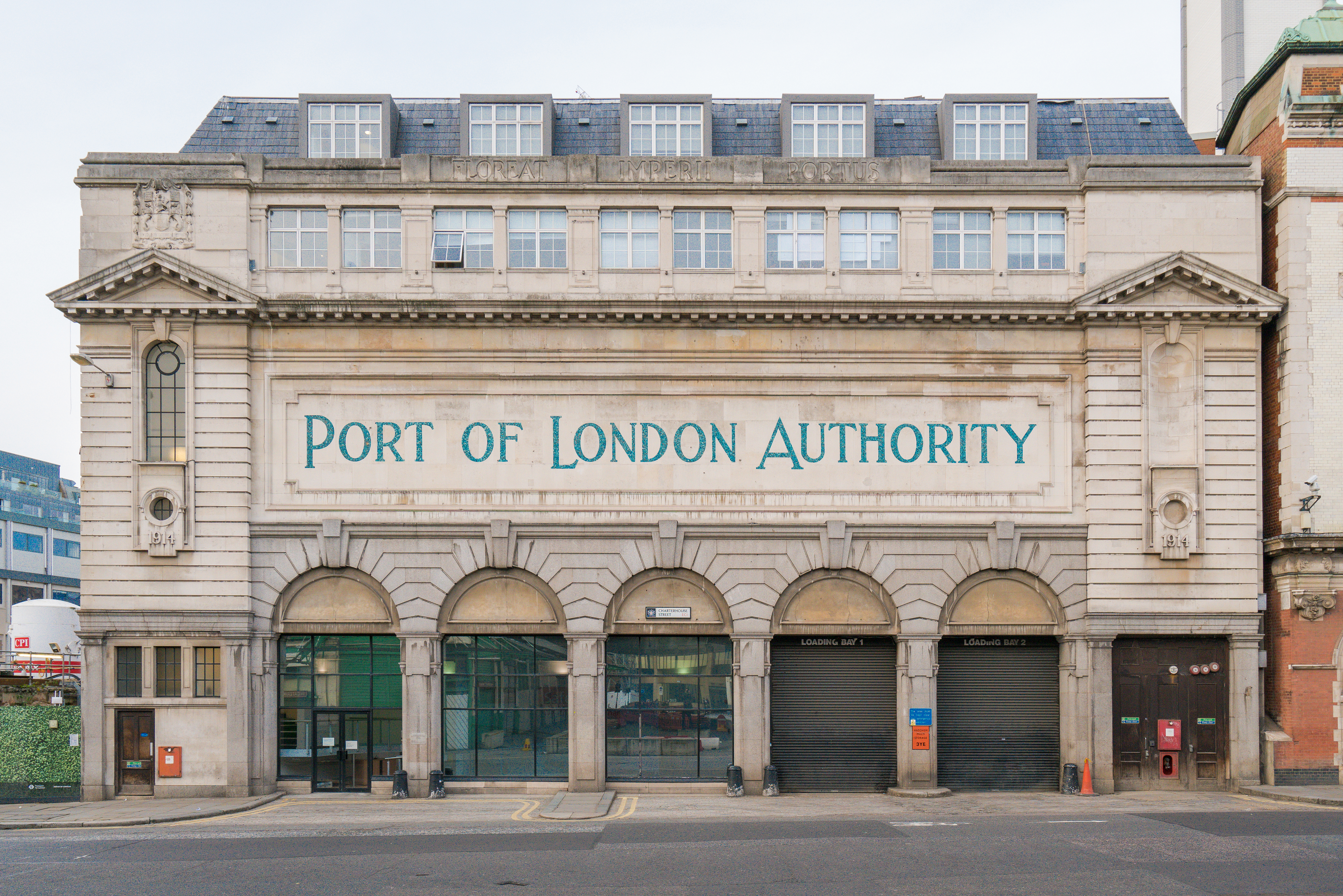
Former PLA Cold Store, Charterhouse Street, Smithfield

The PLA originally had its headquarters on Tower Hill in the City of London, but today it is based at London River House and Royal Terrace Pier in Gravesend. The PLA retains a presence in the City in offices at Walsingham House on Seething Lane, where the Chair and Chief Executive are based.

Control of ship traffic on the Thames within the Port is orchestrated from Port Control Gravesend (the main facility) with two operations rooms covering the entire stretch of the river. Both operations rooms operate the same system for coordinating traffic within the PLA's area, Vessel Traffic Services (VTS). The system includes 16 radar stations along the river and out in the estuary.

The PLA owns Denton Wharf and Jetty in Gravesend, which is the main base for its fleet of more than 40 vessels. It also provides lift-out and maintenance services for other users of the Thames. The PLA owns Barrier Gardens Pier and Unity House, near the Thames Barrier, providing a convenient base for its driftwood vessels. There are also two pilot stations, at Harwich and Ramsgate, beyond the estuary and the Port of London. From these stations pilots are sent out and return from large vessels entering and leaving the Port.

As of 2022, the PLA employed about 460 staff.

== Pier and jetty ownership ==
The PLA owns six piers and jetties on the River Thames. These are available for other river users as well as the PLA's own vessels.

- Barrier Gardens Pier and Unity House, Woolwich
- Royal Terrace Pier and landing stage, Gravesend
- Denton Wharf and Jetty, Gravesend
- Masthouse Terrace Pier, Isle of Dogs
- Peruvian Wharf, Newham
- Royal Primrose Wharf, Newham

== Vessels ==
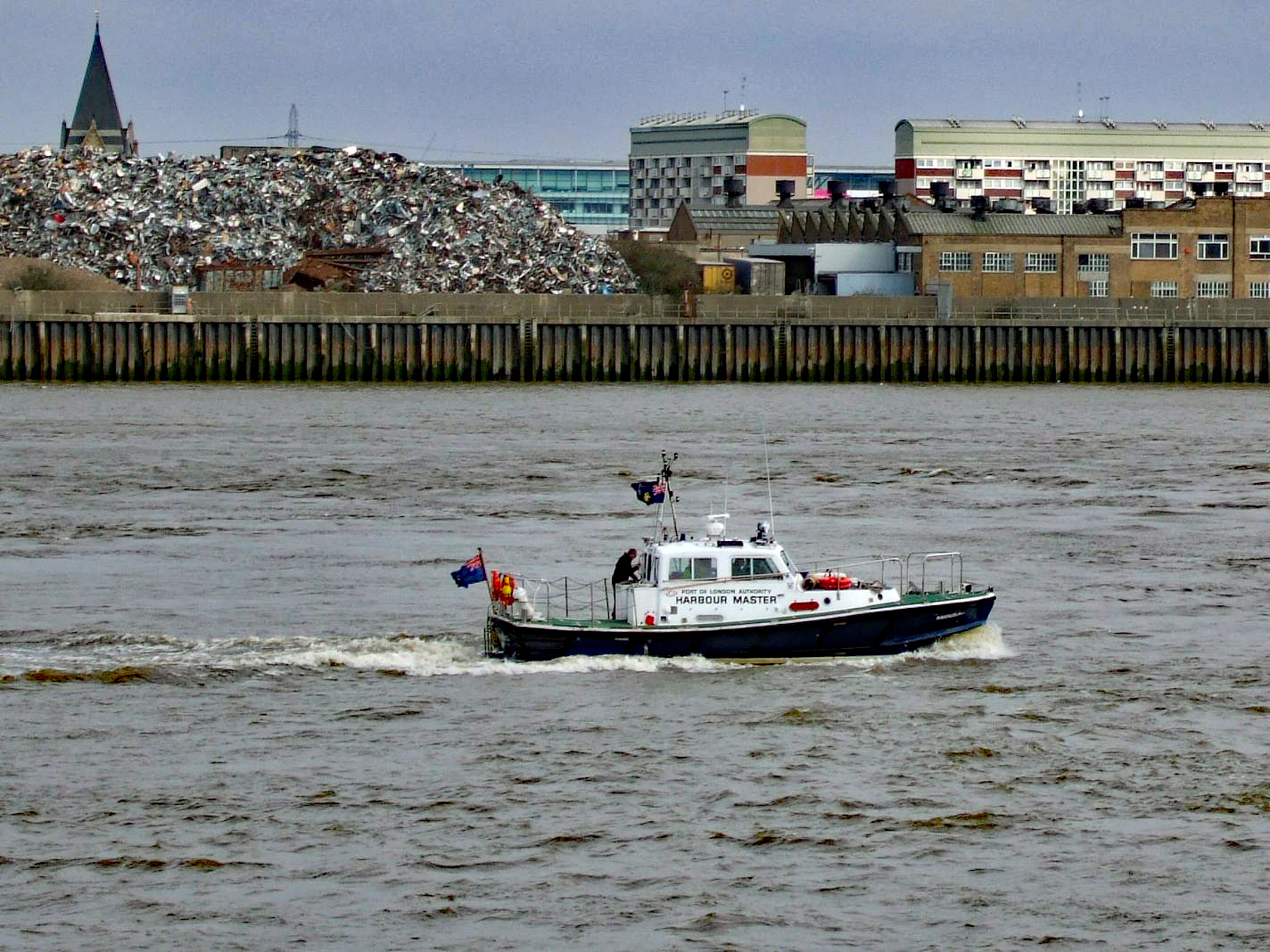
A PLA harbour master craft at Woolwich

The PLA has four channel surveying vessels, eight launches for harbour and river patrols, and twenty other craft. Five new patrol vessels were built by Alnmaritec in Northumberland and delivered in 2009.

=== Harbour Service vessels ===
- Chelsea and Richmond. Catamarans designed for shallow water working in the upper reaches of the port area.
- Lambeth, Kew, Southwark and Barnes. Catamarans designed for the lower tidal waters and for use as Pilot cutters.
- Easthaven and Crane two shallow draught RIBs, the former based at Holehaven and the latter at Richmond.

=== Marine Service vessels ===
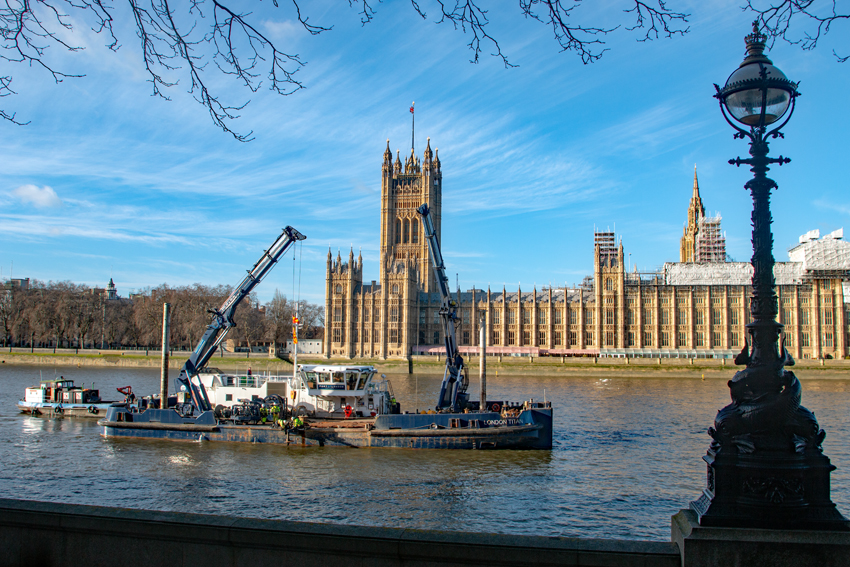
London Titan working opposite the Houses of Parliament

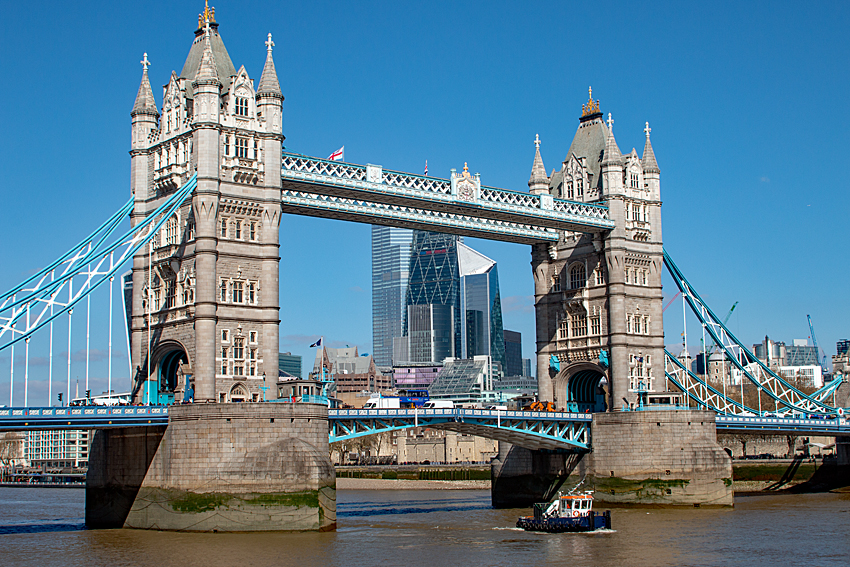
Impulse passing Tower Bridge

- London Titan. Mooring maintenance vessel
- Driftwood II and Driftwood III. Primarily designed for the clearance of driftwood and other debris from the river. Also equipped for salvage operations. Normally accompanied by a fast tender.
- Thames Spirit. Multi-purpose diving support and oil spill recovery vessel.
- Impulse. Pusher tug for handling barges. Also equipped for salvage and clearance work.
- Respond. Fast response oil spill response vessels.
- Gunfleet. Open deck RIB.
- Benfleet Wheelhouse fitted RIB used for crew transfer purposes.

=== Hydrographic Surveying vessels ===
- Maplin, Thame, Yantlet and Galloper. Various catamarans equipped with advanced hydrographic survey equipment. There is also a RIB for use in very shallow waters.

=== Pilot cutters ===
- Guide. Former Estuary Services vessel, 48/50', built by Halmatic. Based at Gravesend.
- Leader. Built by Goodchild Marine, delivered in 2019. Based at Gravesend.
- Commander. Built by Goodchild Marine, delivered in 2025. Based at Gravesend.
- There are six cutters based at Ramsgate and Sheerness operated by Estuary Services Ltd, a company owned by the PLA.

== Railways ==
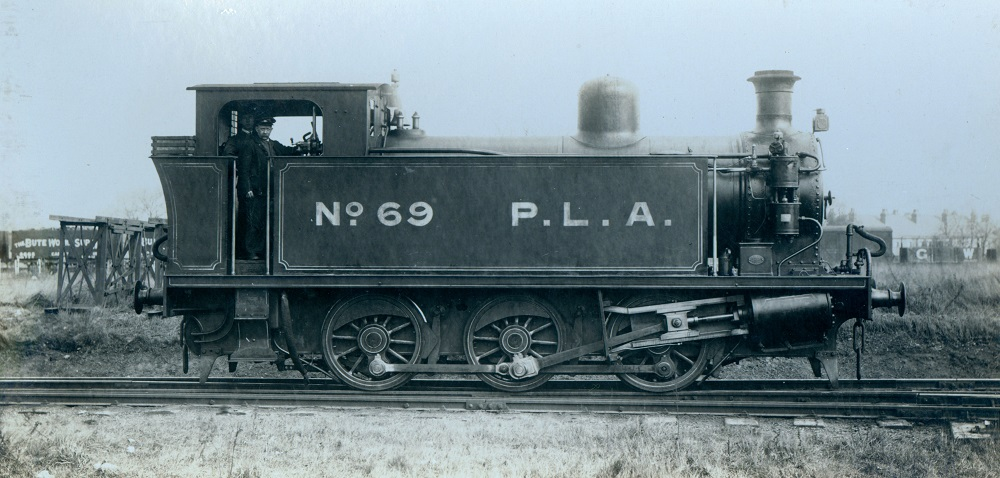
PLA 69, Hawthorn Leslie 0-6-0T

The PLA inherited an extensive railway system from the previous dock companies. This included engine sheds, located at Millwall, Tilbury and Custom House, its own signal boxes and level crossings. The main duties undertaken by the authority's locomotives were shunting the various sidings, wharves and factories around the PLA estate.

The PLA operated a fleet of 0-6-0T and 0-6-0ST steam locomotives made by various manufacturers including Hudswell Clark, Robert Stephenson, Andrew Barclay, Hunslet and Manning Wardle. The steam locomotives were largely withdrawn in 1959 although a few lingered on until 1963. The diesels that replaced them were built by the Yorkshire Engine Company but, with declining traffic, the railway system closed on 1 May 1970.

== Traditions ==
The Lord Mayor of London, the chief dignitary of the City of London, is ex officio the Admiral of the Port of London.

Coat of arms of the Port of London Authority, granted in 1909

The PLA uses a Blue Ensign with a gold heraldic sealion on all its vessels. It also has a house flag and pennants for the use of the chairman and the vice chairman of its board.

The coat of arms of the PLA was granted in August 1909. The blazon or heraldic description is as follows:

Azure, issuing from a castle argent, a demi-man vested, holding in the dexter hand a drawn sword, and in the sinister a scroll Or, the one representing the Tower of London, the other the figure of St Paul, the patron saint of London.
Crest: On a wreath of the colours, an ancient ship Or, the main sail charged with the arms of the City of London.
Supporters: On either side a sea-lion argent, crined, finned and tufted or, issuing from waves of the sea proper, that to the sinister grasping the banner of King Edward II; that to the dexter the banner of King Edward VII

The Latin motto is "Floreat Imperii Portvs", meaning "May the Port of the Empire Flourish".

== See also ==
- London River Services
- List of locations in the Port of London
- List of navigation authorities in the United Kingdom
- Brackish water detailing the type of water of the Thames Estuary as opposed to the North Sea's Kent/Essex Strait which in terms of sea water salinity stops at Gravesend
