= Channel Tunnel Rail Link Act 1996 =

Act of the Parliament of the United Kingdom

Channel Tunnel Rail Link Act 1996 (Note: Section 57.)
- Act of Parliament
- Parliament of the United Kingdom
- Long title: An Act to provide for the construction, maintenance and operation of a railway between St. Pancras, in London, and the Channel Tunnel portal at Castle Hill, Folkestone, in Kent, together with associated works, and of works which can be carried out in conjunction therewith; to make provision about related works; to provide for the improvement of the A2 at Cobham, in Kent, and of the M2 between junctions 1 and 4, together with associated works; to make provision with respect to compensation in relation to the acquisition of blighted land; and for connected purposes.
- Citation: 1996 c. 61
- Territorial extent: United Kingdom

Dates
- Royal assent: 18 December 1996
- Commencement: 18 December 1996 (Note: Section 4(b) of the Interpretation Act 1978.)

Other legislation
- Amends: Town and Country Planning Act 1990
- Amended by: Countryside and Rights of Way Act 2000; Railways Act 2005; Statute Law (Repeals) Act 2013; Policing and Crime Act 2017; Digital Economy Act 2017
- Relates to: Port of London Act 1968; Channel Tunnel Act 1987

Status: Amended

Text of statute as originally enacted

Revised text of statute as amended

Text of the Channel Tunnel Rail Link Act 1996 as in force today (including any amendments) within the United Kingdom, from legislation.gov.uk.

The Channel Tunnel Rail Link Act 1996 (c. 61) is an act of the Parliament of the United Kingdom that made legal provision for the construction, maintenance and operation of the Channel Tunnel Rail Link between St Pancras railway station and the entrance to the Channel Tunnel at Folkestone which is now known as High Speed 1 (HS1) although officially under the legislation it is still the Channel Tunnel Rail Link (CTRL).

== Legislative passage ==
The act was passed as a hybrid bill. The passage of the bill was assisted by the European Passenger Services, the operators of the UK arm of the Eurostar passenger services.

== Further developments ==
The redevelopment of King's Cross enabled by the act completed in 2010.
