= Port of London Act 1908 =

Act of the Parliament of the United Kingdom

Port of London Act 1908 (Note: Section 51.)
- Act of Parliament
- Parliament of the United Kingdom
- Long title: An Act to provide for the improvement and better administration of the Port of London, and for purposes incidental thereto.
- Citation: 8 Edw. 7. c. 68
- Territorial extent: United Kingdom

Dates
- Royal assent: 21 December 1908
- Commencement: 31 March 1909 (Note: Section 49.)
- Repealed: 26 July 1968
Other legislation
Amends	Watermen's and Lightermen's Amendment Act 1859; Thames Conservancy Act 1894
Amended by	Port of London (Amendment) Act 1914; Port of London Act 1915; Port of London (Consolidation) Act 1920; Land Drainage Act 1930
Repealed by	Port of London (Consolidation) Act 1920; Port of London Act 1968
Relates to	Port of London (Registration of Craft) Order Confirmation Act 1910; Port of London (Port Rates on Goods) Provisional Order Act 1910; Thames Conservancy (Appointments and Tolls) Provisional Order Act 1910; Port of London (First Election of Members) Provisional Order Act 1911

Status: Repealed

Text of statute as originally enacted

The Port of London Act 1908 (8 Edw. 7. c. 68) was an act of the Parliament of the United Kingdom, which established the Port of London Authority and regulated corporate governance at the Port of London. It merged numerous inefficient and overlapping private companies and gave unified supervision to Britain's most important port. That enabled London to compete more effectively with Hamburg and Rotterdam. David Lloyd George, the President of the Board of Trade, was the major sponsor for the Liberal Party.

== Contents ==
Sections 1(1) to (6) stated there shall be a port authority with ten appointed members by the Board of Trade and London County Council.

Section 1(7) went on to say the following:

With a view to providing for the representation of labour on the Port Authority, one of the members of the Port Authority appointed by the Board of Trade shall be appointed by the Board after consultation with such organisations representative of labour as the Board think best qualified to advise them upon the matter, and one of the members of the Port Authority appointed by the London County Council shall be appointed by the council after consultation with such organisations representative of labour as the council think best qualified to advise them upon the matter.

== Subsequent developments ==
The whole act except section 60 of, and the seventh and eighth schedules to, the act was repealed by section 3(1) of, and the third schedule to, the Port of London (Consolidation) Act 1920 (10 & 11 Geo. 5. c. clxxiii), which came into force on 23 December 1920.

The whole act was repealed by section 208 of, and schedule 9 to, the Port of London Act 1968, which came into force on 26 July 1968.

== See also ==
- United Kingdom labour law
- British company law
