= Blackwall Rock =

Reef in the River Thames

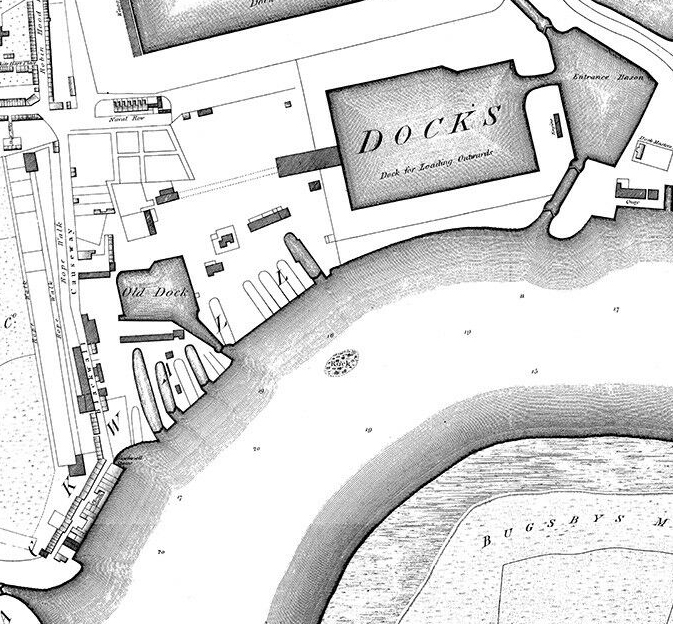
- The rock depicted on Richard Horwood's 1790s map of London
- Interactive map of Blackwall Rock

Geography
- Location: Blackwall, River Thames
- Coordinates: 51°30′23″N 0°0′07.1″W
- OS grid reference: TQ385802
- Area: 4,181 m^{2} (45,000 sq ft)

The Blackwall Rock was a reef in the River Thames in East London. The rock provided a useful shelter for moored vessels, but also proved a hazardous obstruction to river navigation. It was removed in the early 19th century following the opening of the adjacent West India Docks.

== Description ==
Blackwall Rock was located a short distance upriver of Blackwall Stairs, the southern end of a causeway from Poplar High Street which crossed extensive marshland, between the entrances of the West and East India Docks. The rock was always a hazard to river traffic, as it sometimes lay less than 3 feet (1 m) below the surface at low tide. The entrance to the West India Docks, just to the south-west of the rock, was substantially obstructed by the reef upon the docks' opening in 1802. In 1803, in his Strictures on the Alarming Progress of the Blackwall Rock in the River Thames, Robert Edington wrote that he surveyed the rock under the direction of the Corporation of the City of London's harbourmaster, Captain John Raymond Snow. Prior to his survey, Edington was under the impression that the rock was 40 by 30 feet (12.2 m × 9.1 m); Abraham Rees's Cyclopædia, published shortly before Edington's survey, had given these measurements. Rees asserted that newspaper reports of one of Thomas Boddington's West Indiaman vessels being wrecked on the rock were incorrect, and that the relatively recent installation of piling and booms prevented ships from coming near the reef.

Edington's subsequent measurements gave the rough dimensions as 600 by 150 feet (183 m × 46 m). He surmised that the cost of the rock's removal—even with the use of prison labour—would be £50,000, and was surprised by some contract tenders who proposed fees of little more than £1,000. He gathered specimens of the rock, and said that it was not a "natural stone". He stated that he had been told the rock was first discovered in the early 18th century when an Indiaman was wrecked upon it—possibly retelling the story refuted by Rees in 1802. Edington described the rock's composition as "a strong cemented iron stone, formed by an elective attraction of the lapidious or earthly basis, to the very numerous metallic particles always suspended in the river".

Most sources give the rock's dimensions as 300-by-150-foot (91 m × 46 m), and an 1846 report by the Tidal Harbours Commission described it as an outcrop of plum-pudding stone.

== Removal ==
The opening of the West and East India Docks in 1802 and 1803 respectively necessitated the removal of the rock, which obstructed safe navigation to their entrances. Edington proposed the use of prison labour; he recommended that "a hulk with 200 convicts be moored near adjoining the rock, where these convicts should be employed, with proper instruments in drilling and blasting it up". He then recommended the use of ordnance; his proposal employed an iron caisson to create a dry working area, with explosives being driven into a 24-inch (61 cm) hole. The system would ensure that the explosion would drive the force through the rock, breaking it, rather than forcing the explosive charge back through the drilled hole. He conceded that the resulting explosion might blow the caisson "to atoms, and probably be the death of some of the poor men".

Early attempts to break the rock with explosives were largely unsuccessful. William Jessop was engaged by Trinity House to undertake the rock's removal; he subcontracted Ralph Walker as a consultant and James Spedding as engineer. Labourers from Trinity House undertook the physical work. It is also possible that Richard Trevithick worked on the project at some time.

Jessop's proposal used a chisel, operated from a barge much as with pile driving. This method successfully reduced the height of the rock by 15 feet (4.6 m), after which a cylindrical coffer dam (also described as being like a diving bell) was employed to allow workers' access to remove rubble. The works lasted from 1804 to 1808, and cost £42,000. Of this, Spedding's contract was £26,000.

The removal of the rock caused nearby sandy shoals to disappear. John William Norie's Sailing Directions for the River Thames, published in 1847, makes no mention of a navigational hazard in the area of the former rock.
