= West India Docks Act 1831 =

Act of the Parliament of the United Kingdom

- Act of Parliament
- Parliament of the United Kingdom
- Long title: An Act to consolidate and amend the several Acts for making the West India Docks.
- Citation: 1 & 2 Will. 4. c. lii
- Territorial extent: United Kingdom

Dates
- Royal assent: 23 August 1831
- Commencement: 23 August 1831 (Note: The Acts of Parliament (Commencement) Act 1793.)
- Repealed: 23 December 1920
Other legislation
Repeals/revokes	See § Repealed enactments
Amended by	West and East India Dock Act 1838; East and West India Dock Company Act 1874
Repealed by	Port of London (Consolidation) Act 1920

Status: Repealed

Text of statute as originally enacted

The West India Docks Act 1831 (1 & 2 Will. 4. c. lii) was an act of the Parliament of the United Kingdom that consolidated enactments relating to the construction and management of the West India Docks on the Isle of Dogs in London.

== Background ==
The West India Dock Company was incorporated by an Act of 1799 to build docks on the Isle of Dogs for the West India trade, with a compulsory clause requiring West Indian shipping to use the new docks.

== Provisions ==
=== Repealed enactments ===
Section 1 of the act repealed 7 enactments recited in the preamble to the act, so far as they related to the West India Dock Company.

Citation	Short title	Description	Extent of repeal
39 Geo. 3. c. lxix	Port of London Improvement and City Canal Act 1799	An Act for rendering more commodious and better regulating the Port of London.	So far as the same relate to the West India Dock Company.
42 Geo. 3. c. cxiii	West India Dock Company Act 1802	An Act to alter and amend an Act passed in the thirty-ninth year of His present Majesty's reign, intituled "An Act for rendering more commodious and for better regulating the Port of London," so far as the same relates to the concerns of the West India Dock Company thereby established, and for extending to other objects the compensations directed to be made by the said act.	The whole act.
44 Geo. 3. c. vii	West India Docks Act 1804	An Act for raising a further sum of money for carrying into execution an Act passed in the thirty-ninth year of the reign of His present Majesty, intituled "An Act for rendering more commodious and for better regulating the Port of London," and another Act passed in the forty-second year of the said reign, to alter and amend the first-mentioned act.	The whole act.
47 Geo. 3. Sess. 2. c. xxxi	Port of London Improvement and City Canal Act 1807	An Act to authorize the advancement of further sums of money out of the Consolidated Fund, to be applied in completing the canal across the Isle of Dogs, and erecting other works there, and for effecting other improvements of the Port of London, in execution of certain acts already passed for these purposes.	So far as the same relate to the West India Dock Company.
47 Geo. 3. Sess. 2. c. 65	Auction Duty Act 1807	An Act to exempt sales of West India produce by the West India Dock Company, for payment of duties and charges, from the auction duty.	So far as the same relate to the West India Dock Company.
10 Geo. 4. c. lxvii	West India Dock Company Act 1829	An Act to enable the West India Dock Company to raise a further sum of money.	The whole act.
10 Geo. 4. c. cxxx	City Canal Act 1829	An Act for the sale of the City Canal, and for other purposes relating thereto.	The whole act.

== Subsequent developments ==
The West India Docks merged with the East India Docks under the West and East India Dock Act 1838 (1 & 2 Vict. c. ix) to form the East and West India Dock Company.

The whole act was repealed by section 3 of, and the third schedule to, the Port of London (Consolidation) Act 1920 (10 & 11 Geo. 5. c. clxxiii), which came into force on 23 December 1920.
