= Ralph Walker (engineer) =

Scottish civil engineer (1749–1824)

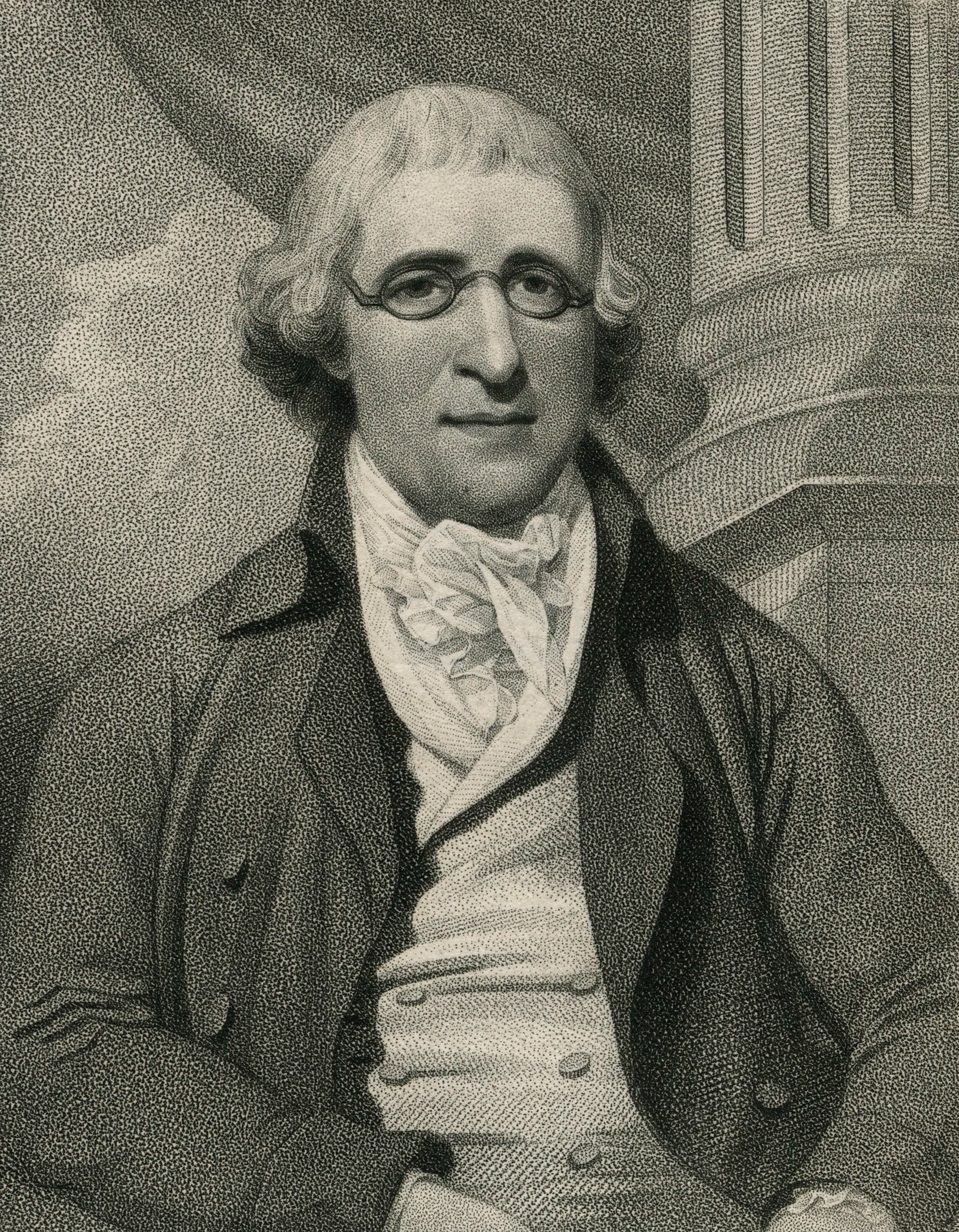
1803 engraving of Walker

Ralph Walker (1749 – 19 February 1824) was a Scottish civil engineer, particularly associated with harbour engineering works in London.

== Early life ==
Walker was born in Tullibody, Clackmannanshire, the second son of farmer James Walker and Helen May. He went to the parish school in Dollar and later was sent by his elder brother James to an academy where he learned marine navigation. He travelled to the Caribbean and managed estates in Jamaica belonging to his mother's family before returning to settle in London in 1793 and becoming involved in plans for London's wet docks.

== Civil engineer ==
Walker submitted designs for the City Canal in 1796 as part of his preliminary designs for the West India Docks on the Isle of Dogs, eventually being appointed resident engineer in August 1799, supervised by William Jessop. In 1800 he submitted designs for a cast iron twin leaf swing bridge as part of the Docks scheme. During this period, he worked with his nephew James Walker who stayed with him in Blackwall, London in the summer of 1880 and, after impressing with his abilities during discussions of the project, was articled to his uncle. In October 1802, however, Ralph Walker had a professional disagreement with Jessop and resigned his post on the West India Docks. He remained on good terms with Jessop, working on a scheme to remove the Blackwall Rock obstruction off Blackwall Point in the River Thames.

In 1803, he was appointed engineer to the East India Dock Company, working with John Rennie. In 1807 the Surrey Commercial Dock Company was formed with Ralph Walker as engineer (until 1810) and James superintending the new lock and keeping the accounts.

Walker was appointed engineer to the East London Waterworks Company from August 1807 to 1824. He designed and supervised the construction of the original Old Ford works along with two low level reservoirs and an upper distribution reservoir. Walker also designed a water supply scheme for Portsmouth, and was consulted on designs for Dover harbour, and on the Thames and Medway Canal scheme.

On Walker's death on 19 February 1824 (he died at his home in East India Dock Road, Poplar following a fall down some steps), James became engineer to the Commercial Dock Company and also succeeded him as engineer to the East India Dock Company.
