= West India Docks =

Historic dock site in eastern London

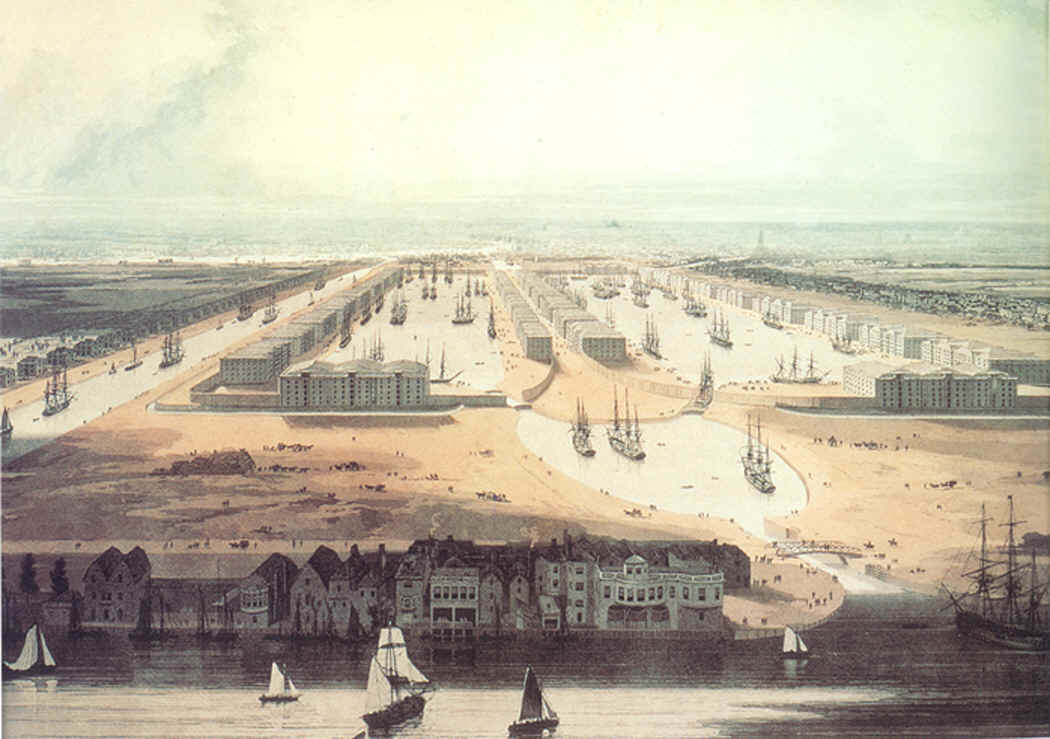
- An 1802 painting of the completed docks. The canal to the left of the painting was later closed and became a third dock. The view is looking west towards the City of London.

- Location within London Borough of Tower Hamlets
- 51.50347°N 0.01722°W
- Location: London

History
- Built: 1802
- Built for: West India Dock Company

Site notes
- Architect: Robert Milligan

The West India Docks are a series of three docks, quaysides, and warehouses built to import goods from, and export goods and occasionally passengers to the British West Indies. Located on the Isle of Dogs in London, the first dock opened in 1802. Following their commercial closure in 1980, the Canary Wharf development was built around the wet docks by narrowing some of their broadest tracts.

== History ==
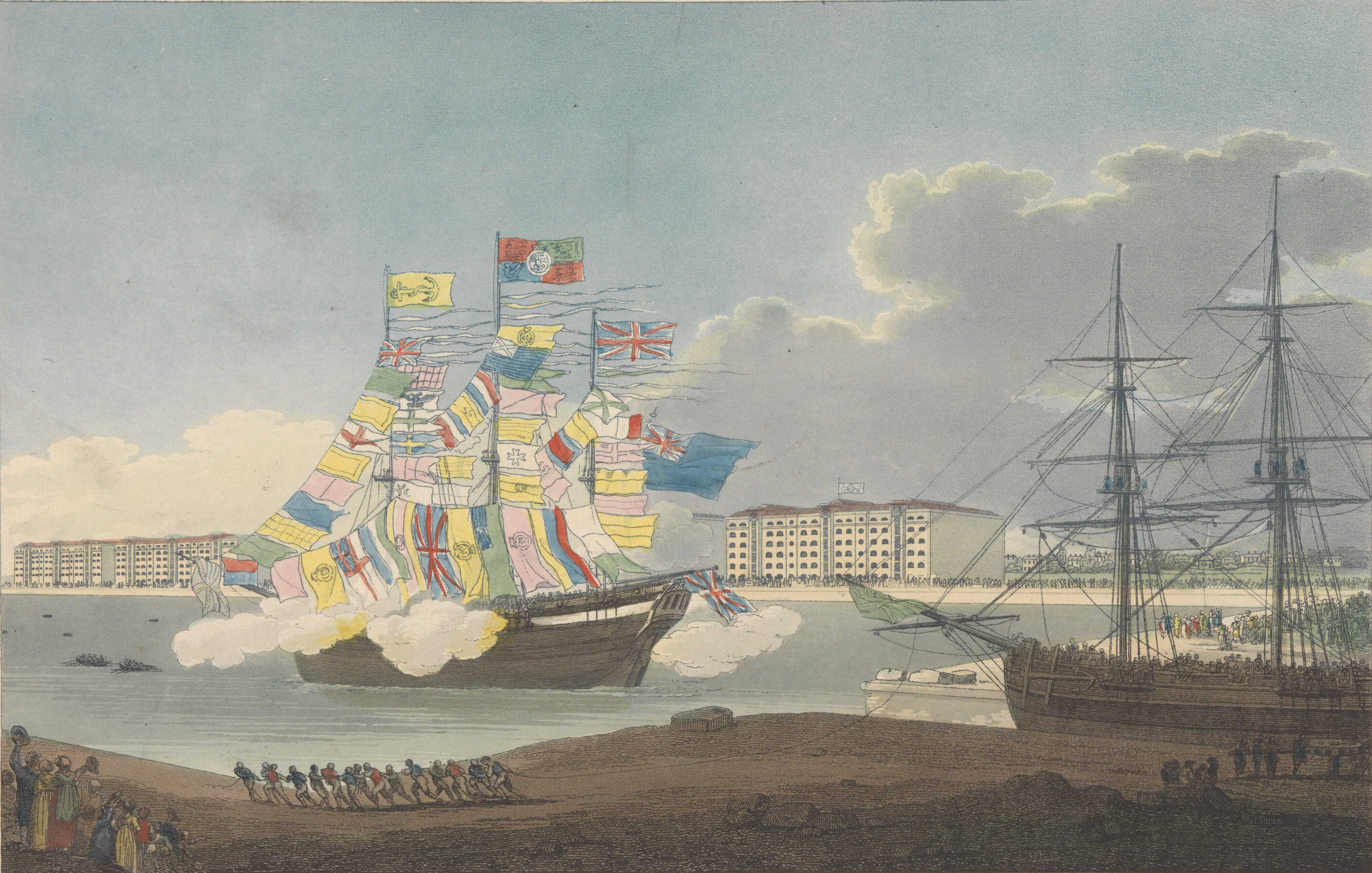
The Henry Addington chosen as the first ship to enter the Grand dock, 27 August 1802, followed by the Echo, the second ship to enter

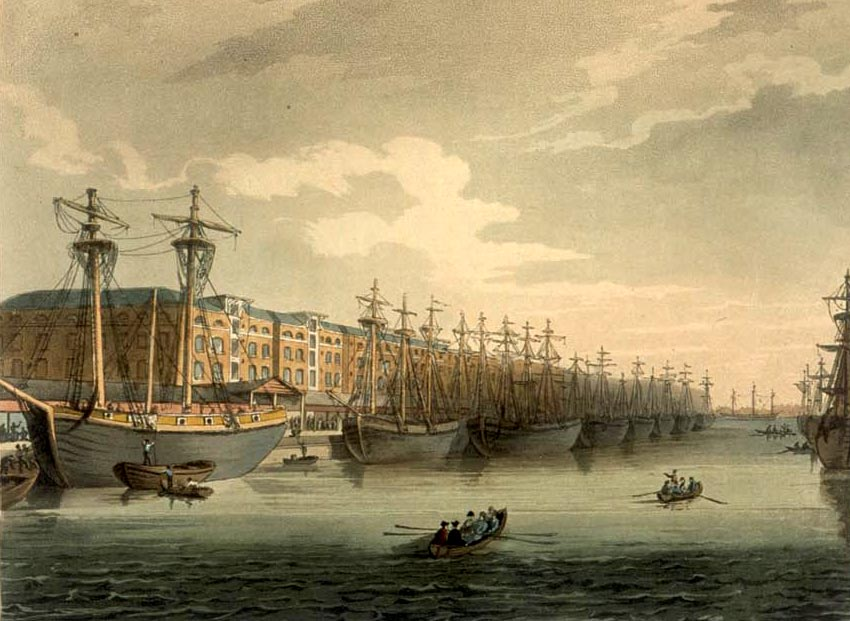
West India Docks by Augustus Pugin and Thomas Rowlandson (figures) from Rudolph Ackermann's Microcosm of London, or, London in Miniature (1808–11).

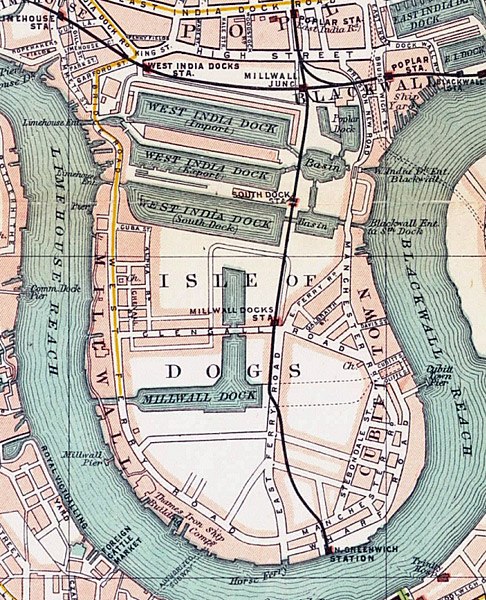
Map of the Isle of Dogs showing the docks from The Pocket Atlas and Guide to London, 1899

=== 19th century ===
Port of London Improvement and City Canal Act 1799
- Act of Parliament
- Parliament of Great Britain
- Long title: An act for rendering more commodious, and for better regulating, the port of London.
- Citation: 39 Geo. 3. c. lxix
- Territorial extent: Great Britain

Dates
- Royal assent: 12 June 1799
- Commencement: 12 June 1799 (Note: The Acts of Parliament (Commencement) Act 1793.)
- Repealed: 17 August 1894
Other legislation
Amended by	West India Dock Company Act 1802; West India Docks Act 1831
Repealed by	Thames Conservancy Act 1894

Status: Repealed

Text of statute as originally enacted

West India Dock Company Act 1802
- Act of Parliament
- Parliament of the United Kingdom
- Long title: An Act to alter and amend an Act, passed in the Thirty ninth Year of His present Majesty's Reign, intituled "An Act for rendering more commodious and for better regulating the Port of London," so far as the same relates to the Concerns of the West India Dock Company thereby established, and for extending to other Objects the Compensations directed to be made by the said Act.
- Citation: 42 Geo. 3. c. cxiii
- Territorial extent: United Kingdom

Dates
- Royal assent: 26 June 1802
- Commencement: 26 June 1802
- Repealed: 23 August 1831
Other legislation
Amends	Port of London Improvement and City Canal Act 1799
Repealed by	West India Docks Act 1831

Status: Repealed

Text of statute as originally enacted

West India Docks Act 1804
- Act of Parliament
- Parliament of the United Kingdom
- Long title: An Act for raising a further sum of money for carrying into execution an act, passed in the thirty-ninth year of the reign of his present Majesty, intituled, "An act for rendering more commodious, and for better regulating the port of London;" and another act passed in the forty-second year of the said reign, to alter and amend the first mentioned act.
- Citation: 44 Geo. 3. c. vii
- Territorial extent: United Kingdom

Dates
- Royal assent: 23 March 1804
- Commencement: 23 March 1804
- Repealed: 23 August 1831
Other legislation
Repealed by	West India Docks Act 1831

Status: Repealed

Text of statute as originally enacted

West India Dock Company Act 1829
- Act of Parliament
- Parliament of the United Kingdom
- Long title: An Act to enable the West India Dock Company to raise a further Sum of Money.
- Citation: 10 Geo. 4. c. lxvii
- Territorial extent: United Kingdom

Dates
- Royal assent: 22 May 1829
- Commencement: 22 May 1829
- Repealed: 23 August 1831
Other legislation
Repealed by	West India Docks Act 1831

Status: Repealed

Text of statute as originally enacted

Robert Milligan (c. 1746–1809) of a Scottish family, was largely responsible for the construction of the West India Docks. He was a wealthy West Indies merchant, slave trader and ship owner, who returned to London having managed his family's Jamaica sugar plantations. Outraged at losses due to theft and delay at the extensive (continuously along the Thames for 11 miles (18 km)) riverside wharves comprising the Port of London, Milligan headed a group of powerful businessmen (including George Hibbert, the chairman of the London Society of West India Planters and Merchants who was a merchant, politician, and ship-owner) who promoted the creation of a wet dock circled by a high wall. The group planned and built West India Docks, lobbying Parliament to allow the creation of a West India Dock Company. Milligan served as both deputy chairman and chairman of the West India Dock Company. The docks were authorised by the Port of London Improvement and City Canal Act 1799 (39 Geo. 3. c. lxix).

The docks were constructed in two phases. The two northern docks were constructed between 1800 and 1802 for the West India Dock Company to a design by leading civil engineer William Jessop (with consultant John Rennie, appointed resident engineer Ralph Walker, and with input from Thomas Morris, Liverpool's third dock engineer), and were the first commercial wet docks in London. British Prime Minister William Pitt the Younger and Lord Chancellor Lord Loughborough were assisted in the foundation stone ceremony on 12 July 1800 by Milligan and Hibbert. The docks were formally opened on 27 August 1802 when the unladen Henry Addington was hauled in by ropes. Echo, a ship laden with cargo from the West Indies, followed. For the following 21 years all vessels in the West India trade using the Port of London were compelled to use the West India docks by a clause in the act of Parliament that had enabled their construction. The West India Docks Act 1831 (1 & 2 Will. 4. c. lii) consolidated acts related to the docks.

The West India Docks merged with the East India Docks by the West and East India Dock Act 1838 (1 & 2 Vict. c. ix) to form the East and West India Dock Company.

The southern dock, the South West India Dock, later known as South Dock, was constructed in the 1860s, replacing the unprofitable City Canal, built in 1805. (Note: The City Canal had been constructed across the Isle of Dogs just to the south of West India Docks. The aim had been to provide a short cut for sailing ships, to save them travelling around the bottom of the Isle of Dogs to access the wharves in the upper reaches of the Thames; if winds were unfavourable, this journey could take some time. However, access to the canal was determined by the state of the tide, fees were expensive, and the transit slow.)

=== 20th century ===
In 1909 the Port of London Authority (PLA) took over the West India Docks, along with the other enclosed docks from St Katharines to Tilbury. From 1960 to 1980, trade in the docks declined to almost nothing, for two main reasons. First, the development of the shipping container made this type of relatively small dock inefficient, and the dock-owners were slow to embrace change. Second, the manufacturing exports which had maintained the trade through the docks dwindled and moved away from the local area. The docks were closed in 1981.

After the closure of the upstream enclosed docks, the area was regenerated as part of the Docklands scheme, and is now home to the developments of Canary Wharf. The early phase one buildings of Canary Wharf were built out over the water, reducing the width of the north dock and middle dock. Canary Wharf tube station was constructed within the middle dock in the 1990s.

=== 21st century ===
Part of the original dock building was converted for use as the Museum of London Docklands in 2003. The Crossrail Place development was completed in May 2015 and the Canary Wharf Crossrail station below it was completed in September 2015.

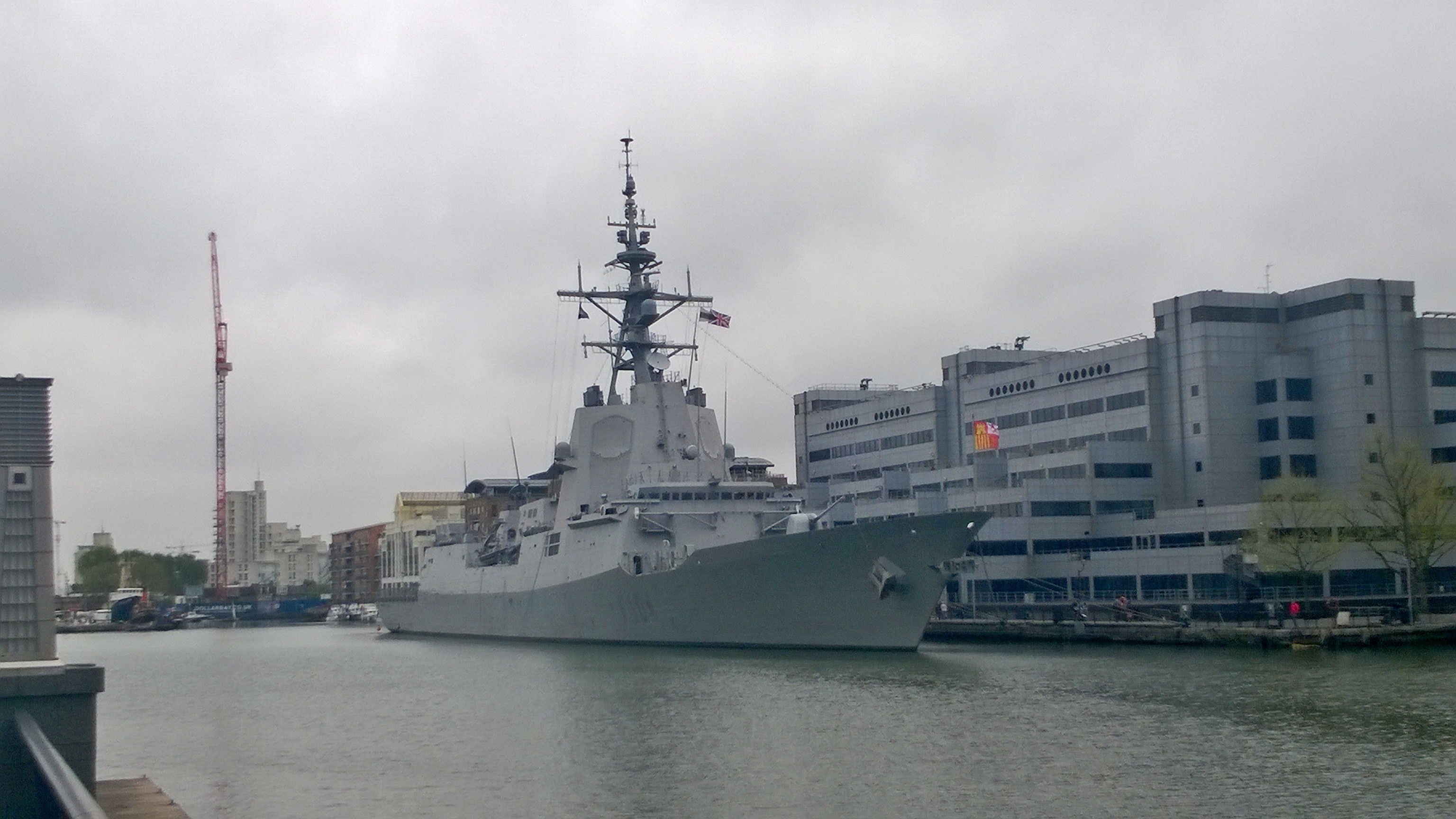
The Spanish air defence frigate Méndez Núñez moored at South Dock in 2015

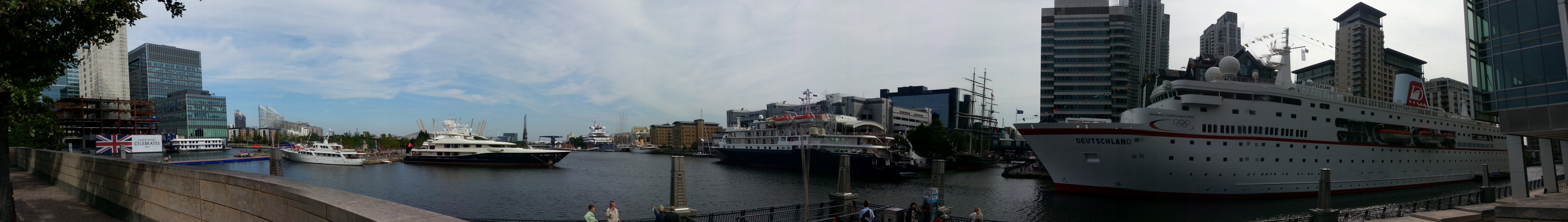
Panorama view of vessels moored in the south dock of the West India Docks during the 2012 Summer Olympics, viewed from the southeastern corner of the Canary Wharf estate.

==== Seizure of superyacht PHI ====
In March 2022, the superyacht PHI, a 58.5-metre vessel valued at £38 million, was seized by UK authorities while moored at South Dock in the West India & Millwall Docks complex. The detention was ordered by Transport Secretary Grant Shapps under the Russia (Sanctions) (EU Exit) Regulations 2019, following Russia's invasion of Ukraine. The yacht's owner, Russian property developer Sergei Naumenko, was not himself subject to sanctions by the UK, EU, or United States, but the vessel was detained as an asset "connected to Russia". PHI remains moored at the docks as of 2026, a visible symbol of sanctions against Russian-connected assets.

==== 2026 bird flu outbreak ====
In February 2026, a significant avian influenza outbreak (later confirmed as H5N1) occurred at West India Docks and the adjacent Millwall Dock. Between 30 and 51 dead mute swans were recovered from the waterways over a one-week period. The Canal and River Trust, which manages the waterways, worked with the Department for Environment, Food and Rural Affairs and the Animal and Plant Health Agency (APHA) to remove the carcasses and conduct testing.

== Layout ==
The original docks consisted of an Import Dock of 30 acres (120,000 m^{2}) of water, later named North Dock, and an Export Dock of 24 acres (97,000 m^{2}), later named Middle Dock. Between them, the docks had a combined capability to berth over 600 vessels. Locks and basins at either end of the Docks connected them to the river Thames. These were known as Blackwall Basin and Limehouse Basin, not to be confused with the Regent's Canal Dock also known as Limehouse Basin. To avoid congestion, ships entered from the (eastern) Blackwall end; lighters entered from the Limehouse end to the west. A dry dock for ship repairs was constructed connecting to Blackwall Basin. Subsequently, the North London Railway's Poplar Dock was also connected to Blackwall Basin.

The Docks' design allowed a ship arriving from the West Indies to unload in the northern dock, sail round to the southern dock and load up with export cargo in a fraction of the time it had previously taken in the heavily congested and dangerous upper reaches of the Thames. Around the Import Dock a continuous line of five-storey warehouses was constructed, designed by architect George Gwilt and his son, also named George. The Export Dock needed fewer buildings as cargo was loaded upon arrival. To protect against theft, the whole complex was surrounded by a brick wall 20 ft (6.1 m) high.

The three docks were initially separate, with the two northern docks interconnected only via the basin at each end, and South Dock connected via a series of three basins at the eastern end. Railway access was very difficult. Under PLA control, cuts were made to connect the three docks into a single system, and the connections to the Thames at the western end were filled, along with the Limehouse basin and with it the western connection between the two northern docks. This allowed improved road and rail access from the north and west. South Dock was also connected to the north end of Millwall Dock, its enlarged eastern lock becoming the only entrance from the Thames to the whole West India and Millwall system.

== Gallery: West India Dock (North Dock) ==
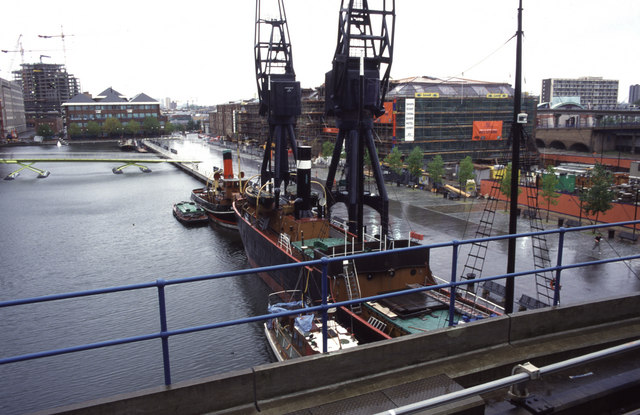
West India Docks, October 1998

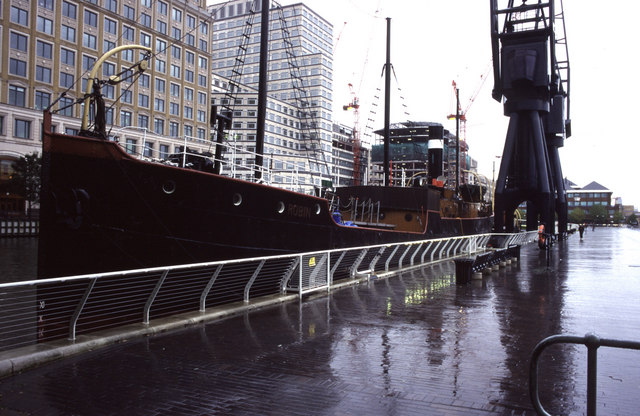
West India Docks, October 1998

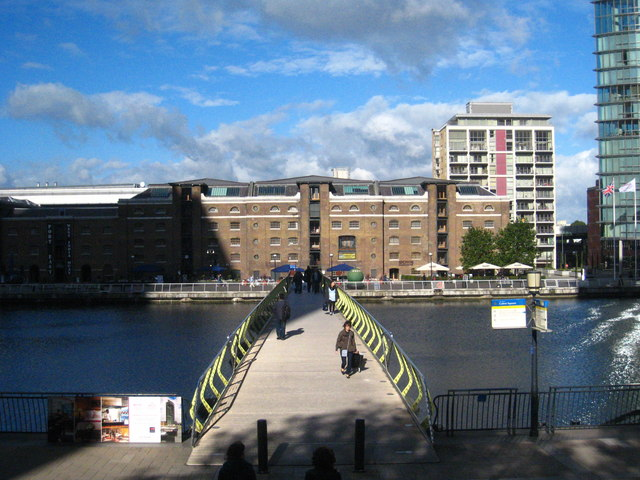
West India Dock North footbridge

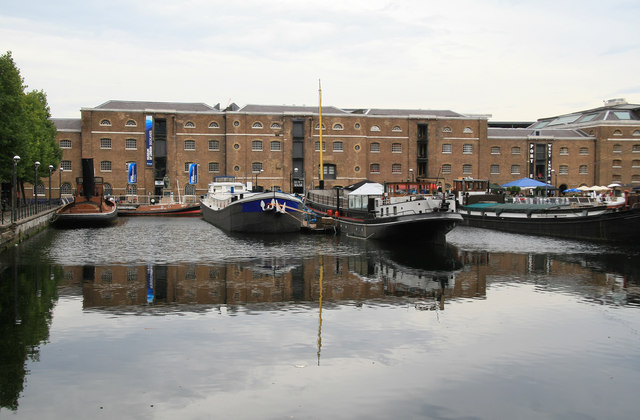
West India Docks, August 2011

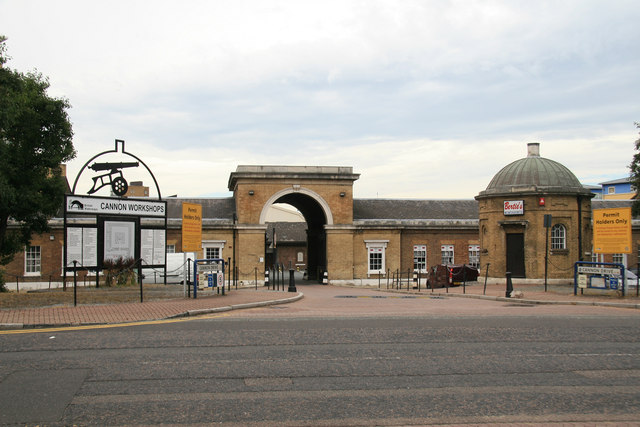
Cannon Workshops near West India Dock, August 2011

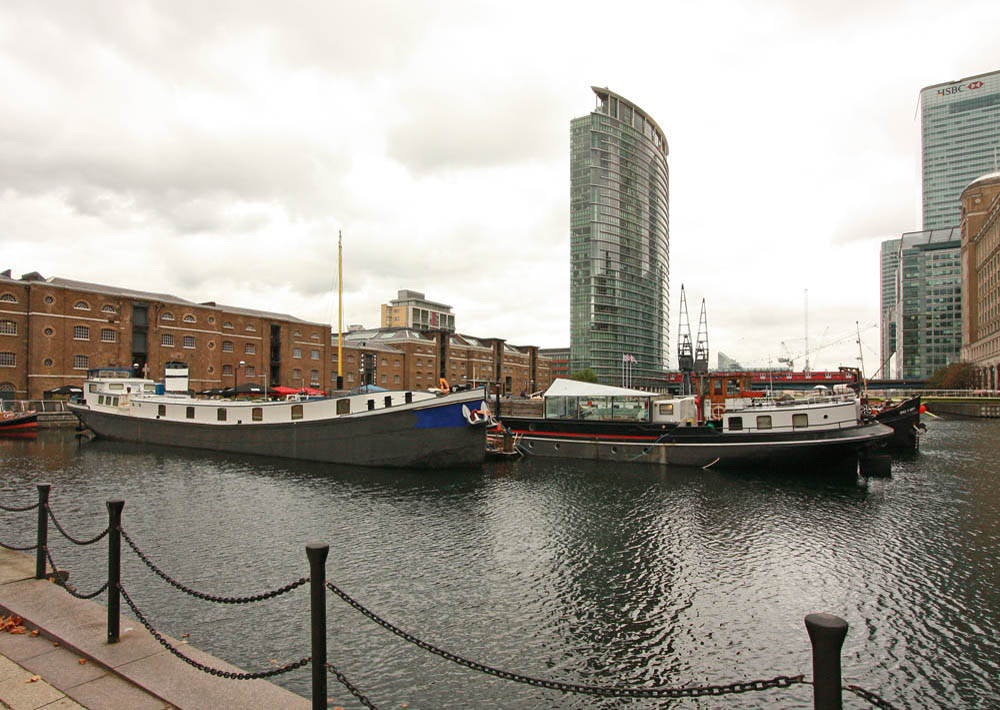
West India Dock North, October 2011

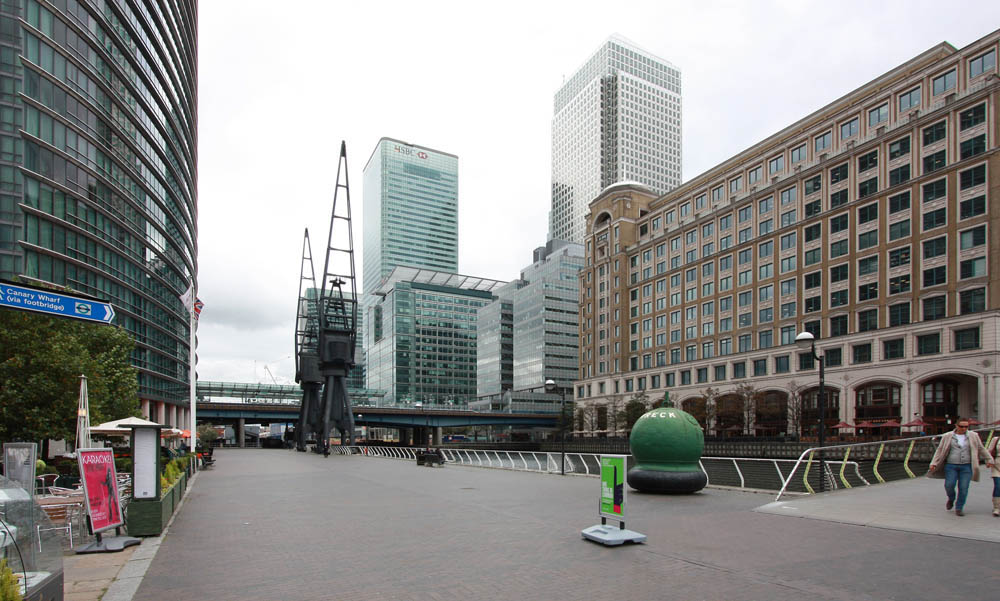
West India Dock North Quay, October 2011

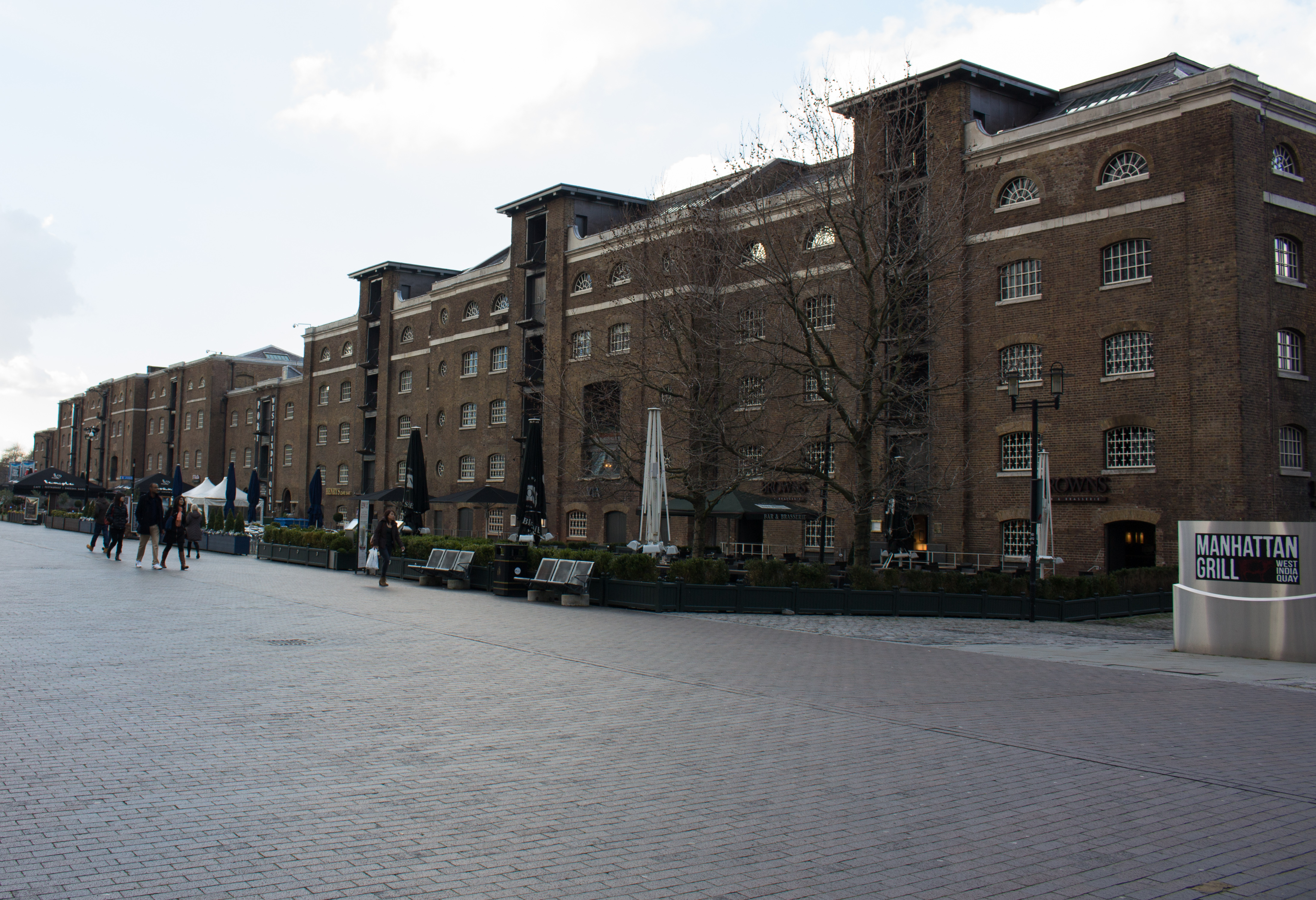
North Quay, West India Dock, March 2014

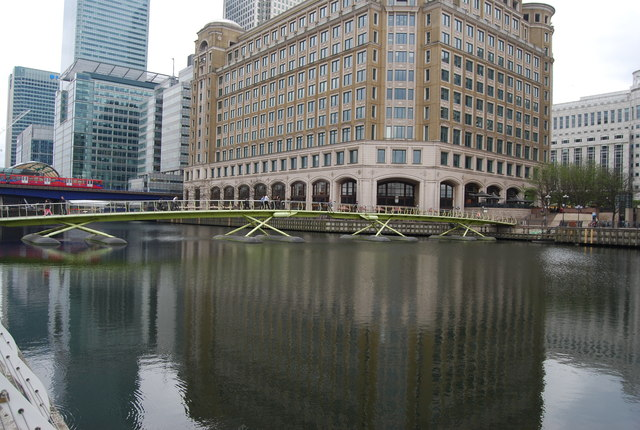
West India Dock (North Dock), April 2014

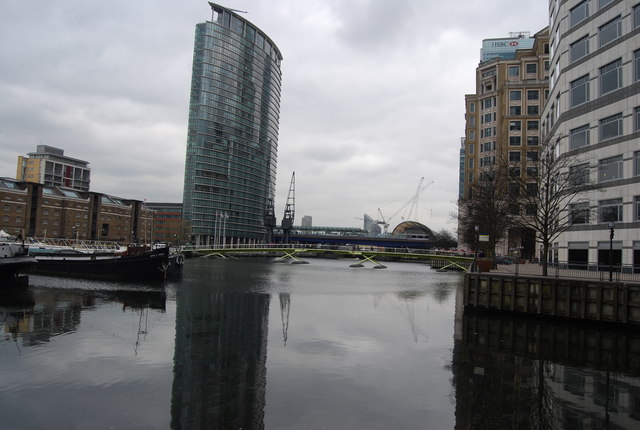
West India Dock (North Dock), April 2014

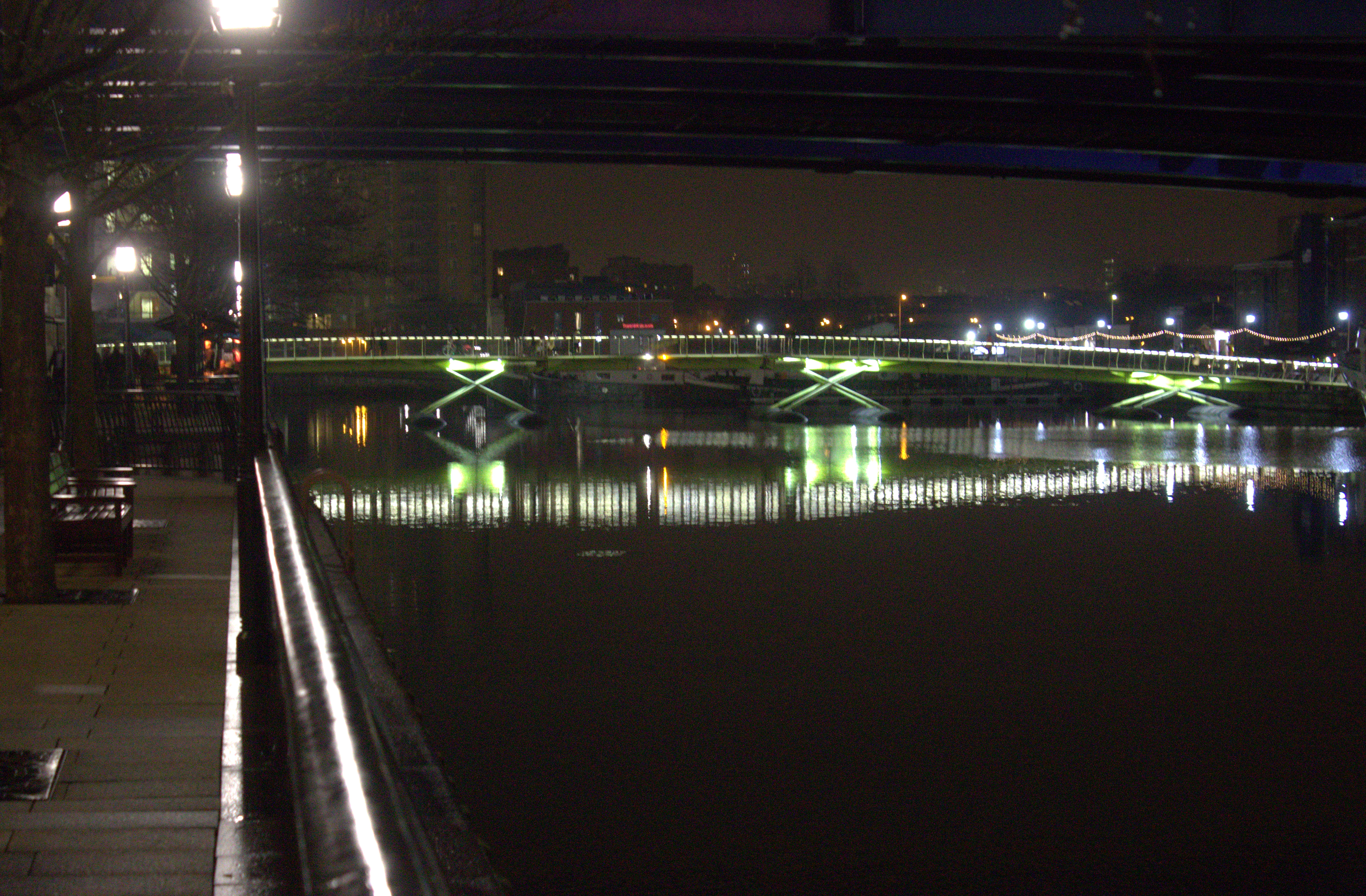
West India Dock footbridge, January 2017

== Gallery: West India Dock (South Dock) ==
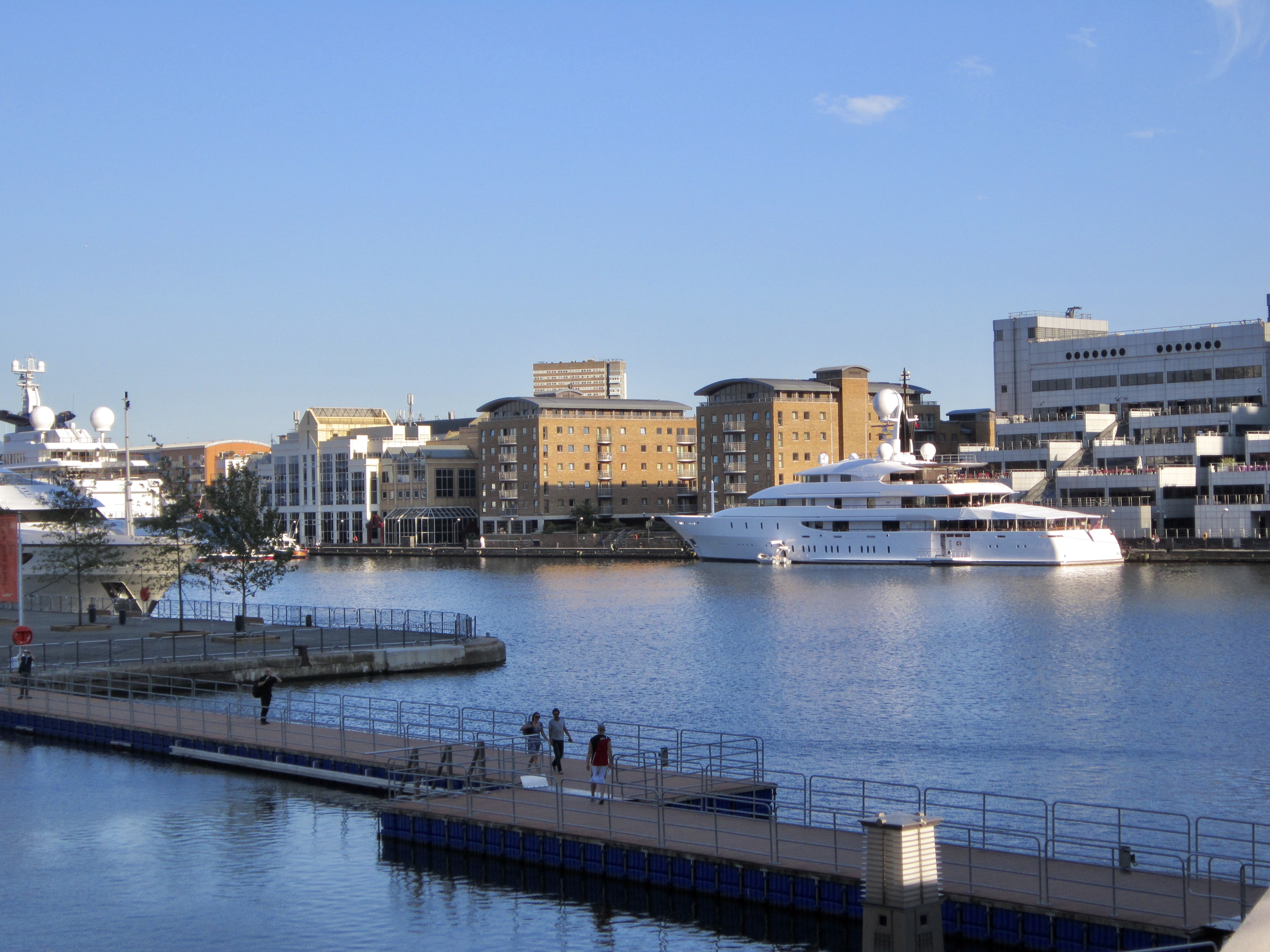
View of the West India Docks, July 2012

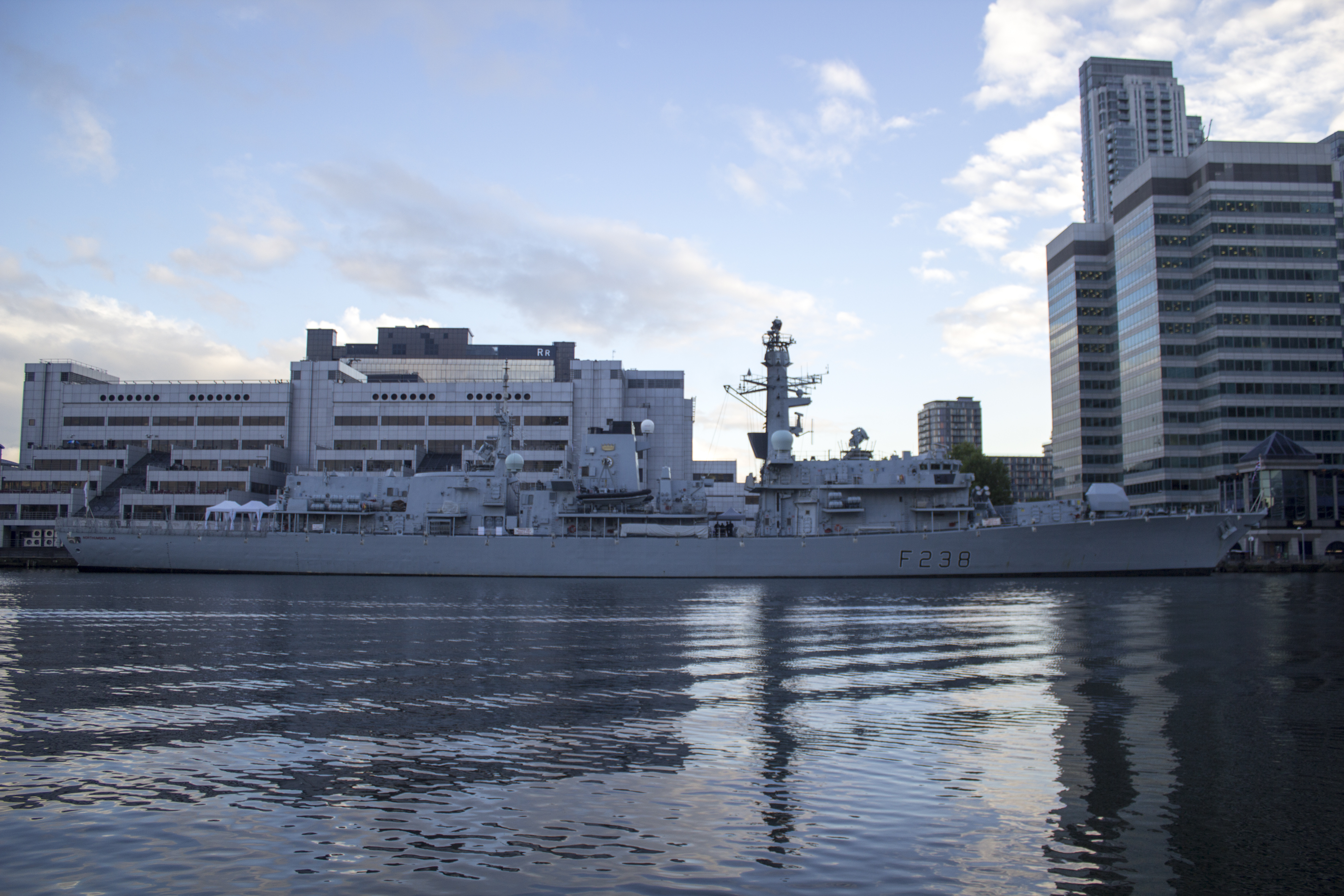
HMS Northumberland (F238) docked at West India South Dock, September 2013

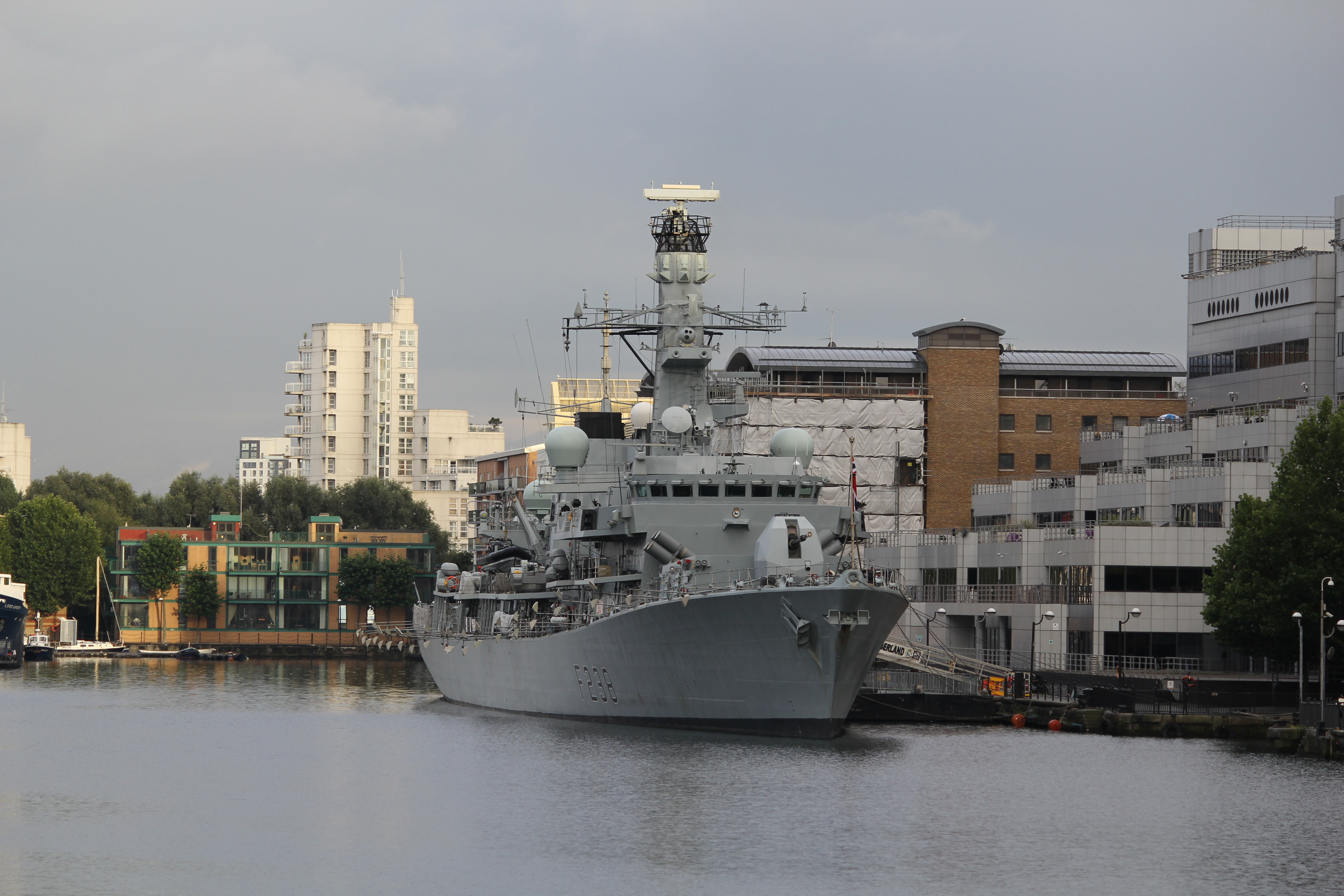
HMS Northumberland (F238) docked at West India South Dock, September 2013

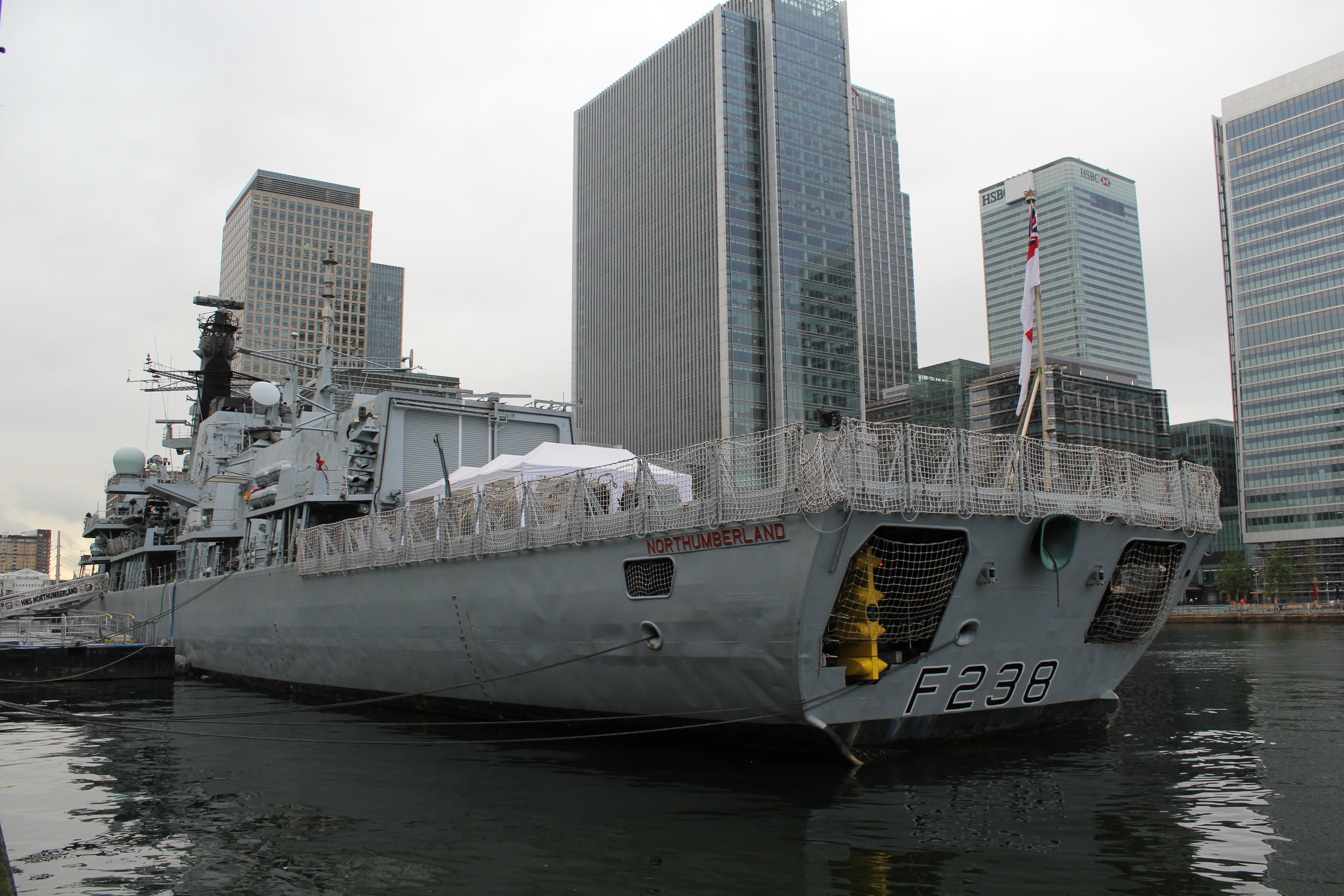
HMS Northumberland (F238) docked at West India South Dock, September 2013

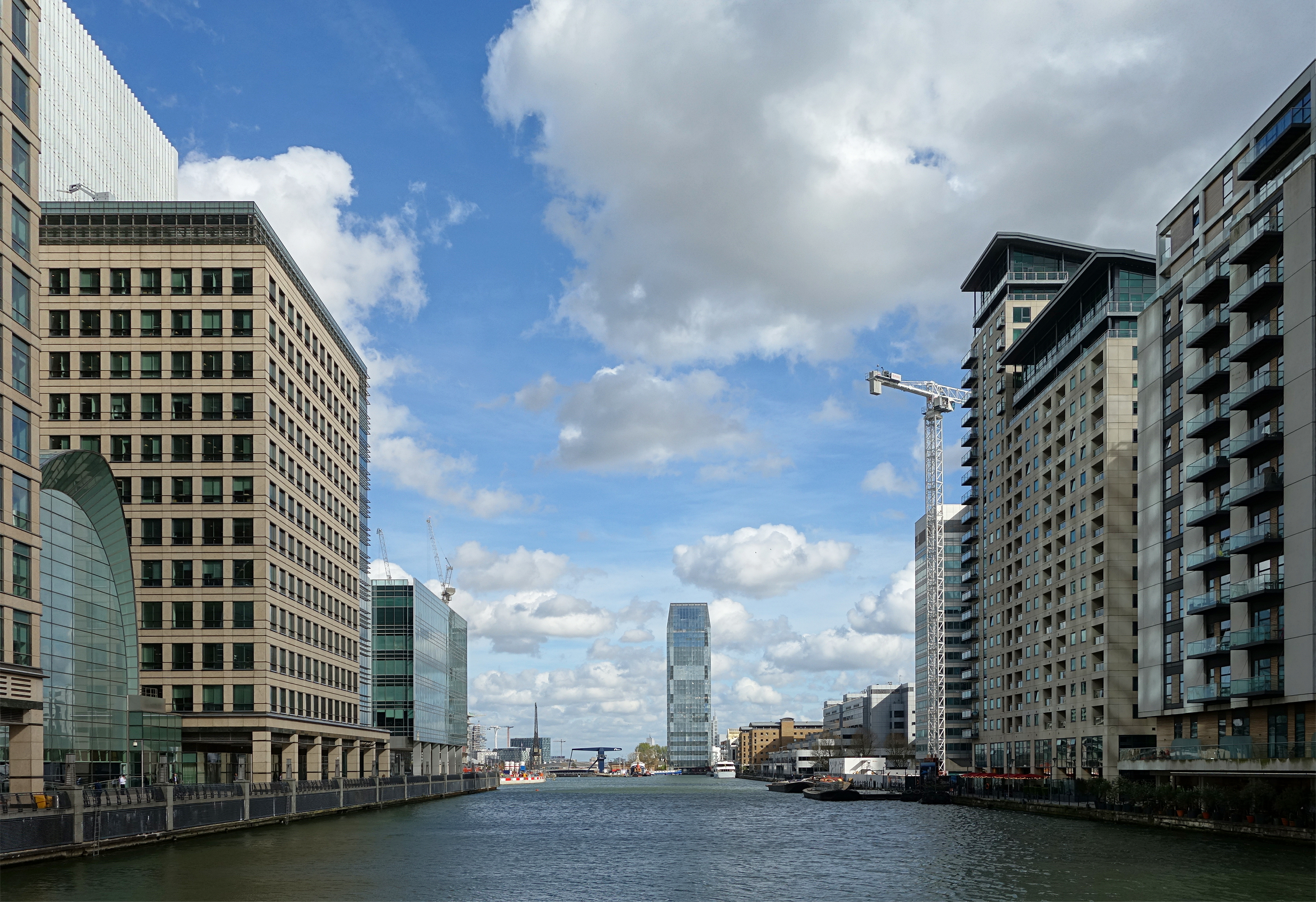
West view from South Quay Walk, March 2017.

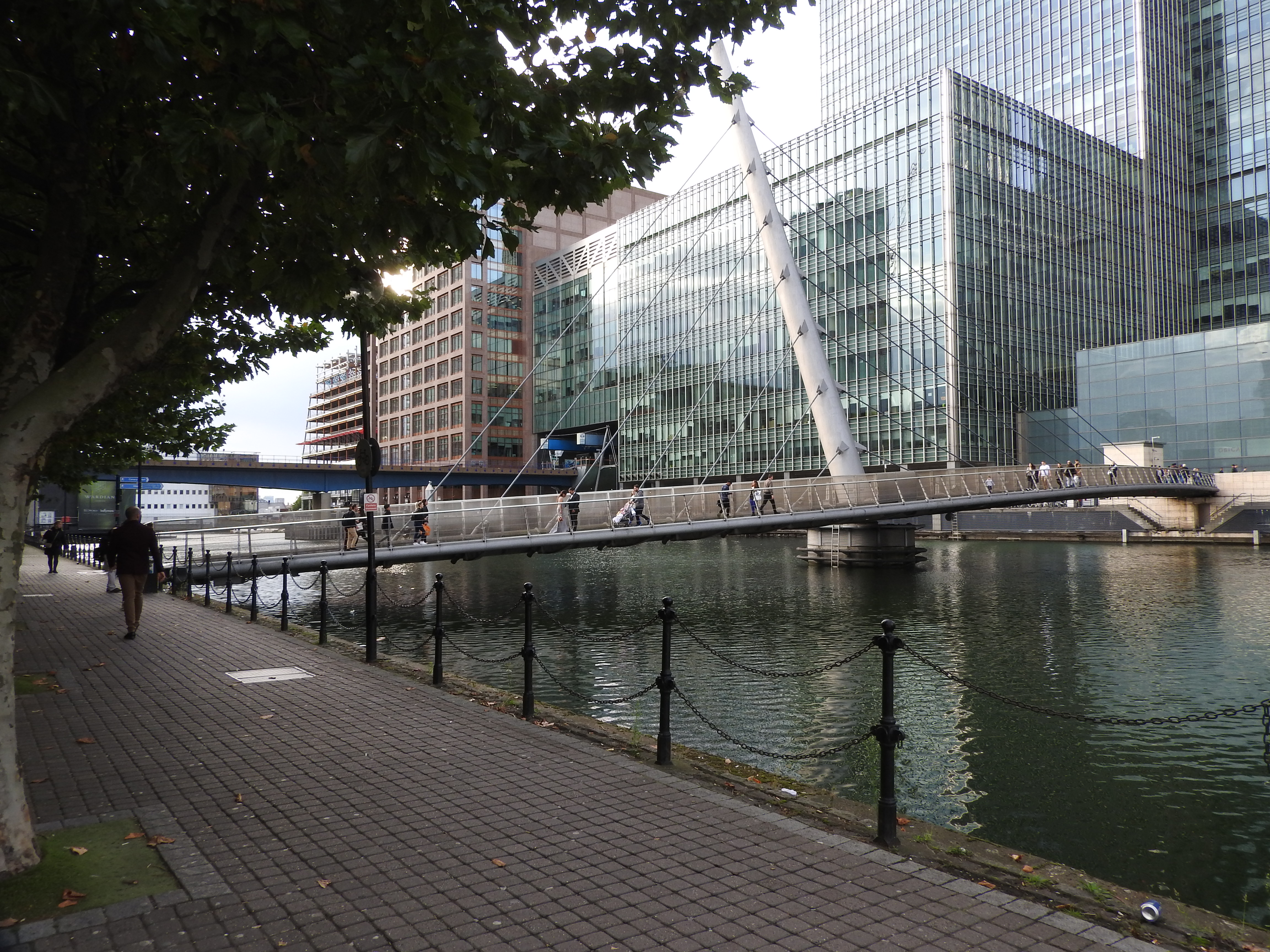
West India Docks, South Dock by South Quays, September 2017

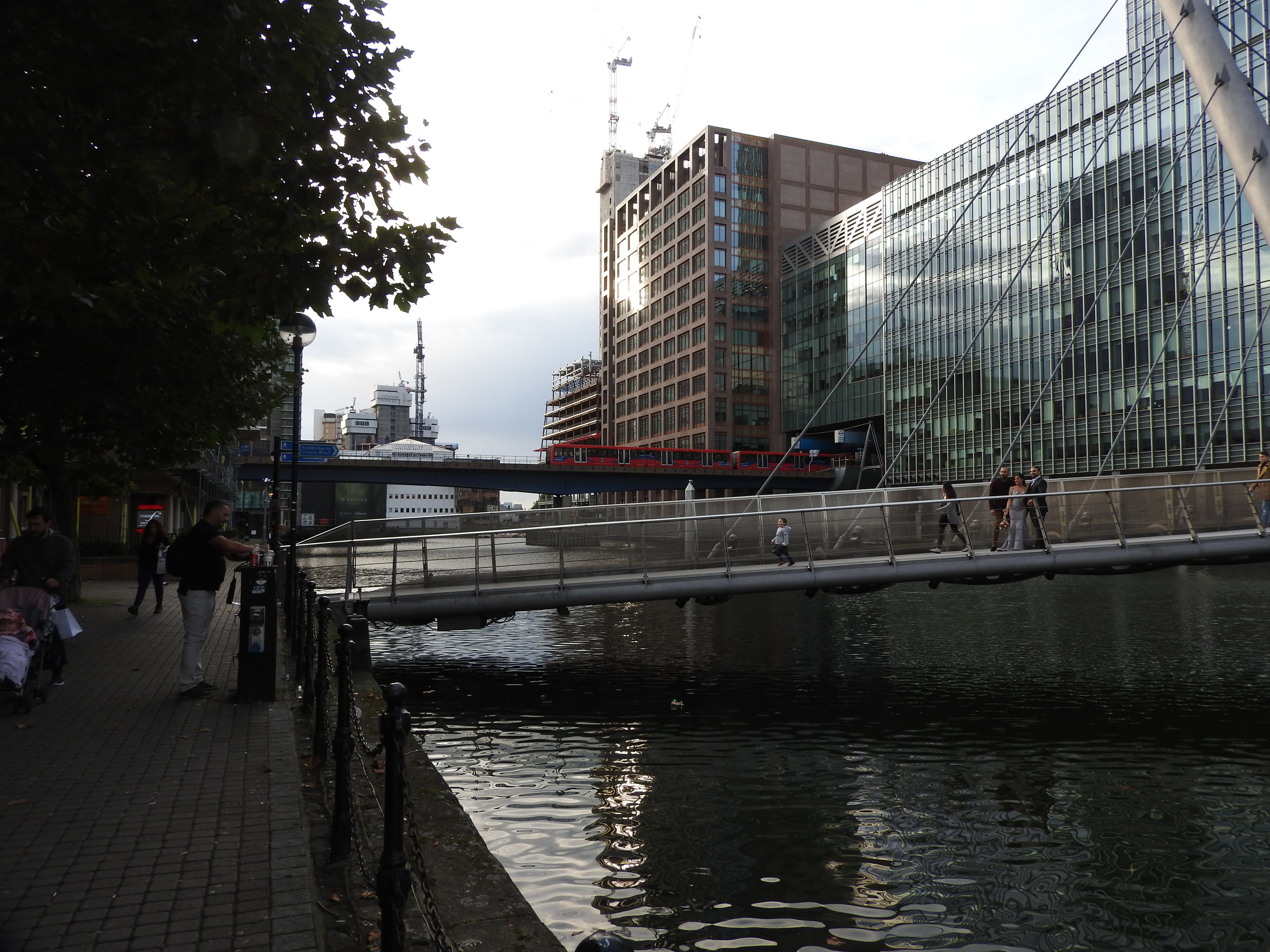
West India Docks, South Dock by South Quays, September 2017

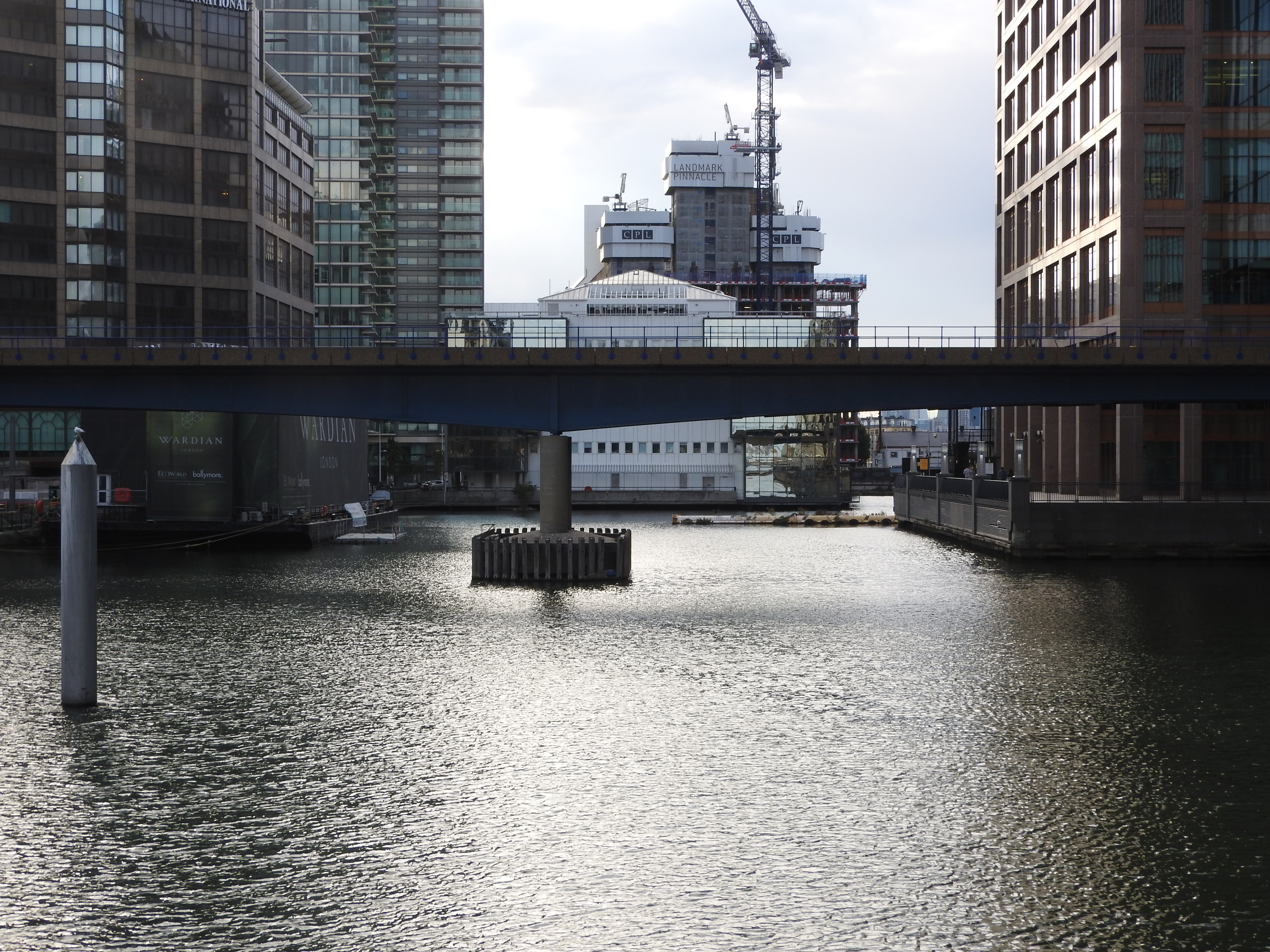
West India Docks, South Dock by South Quays, September 2017

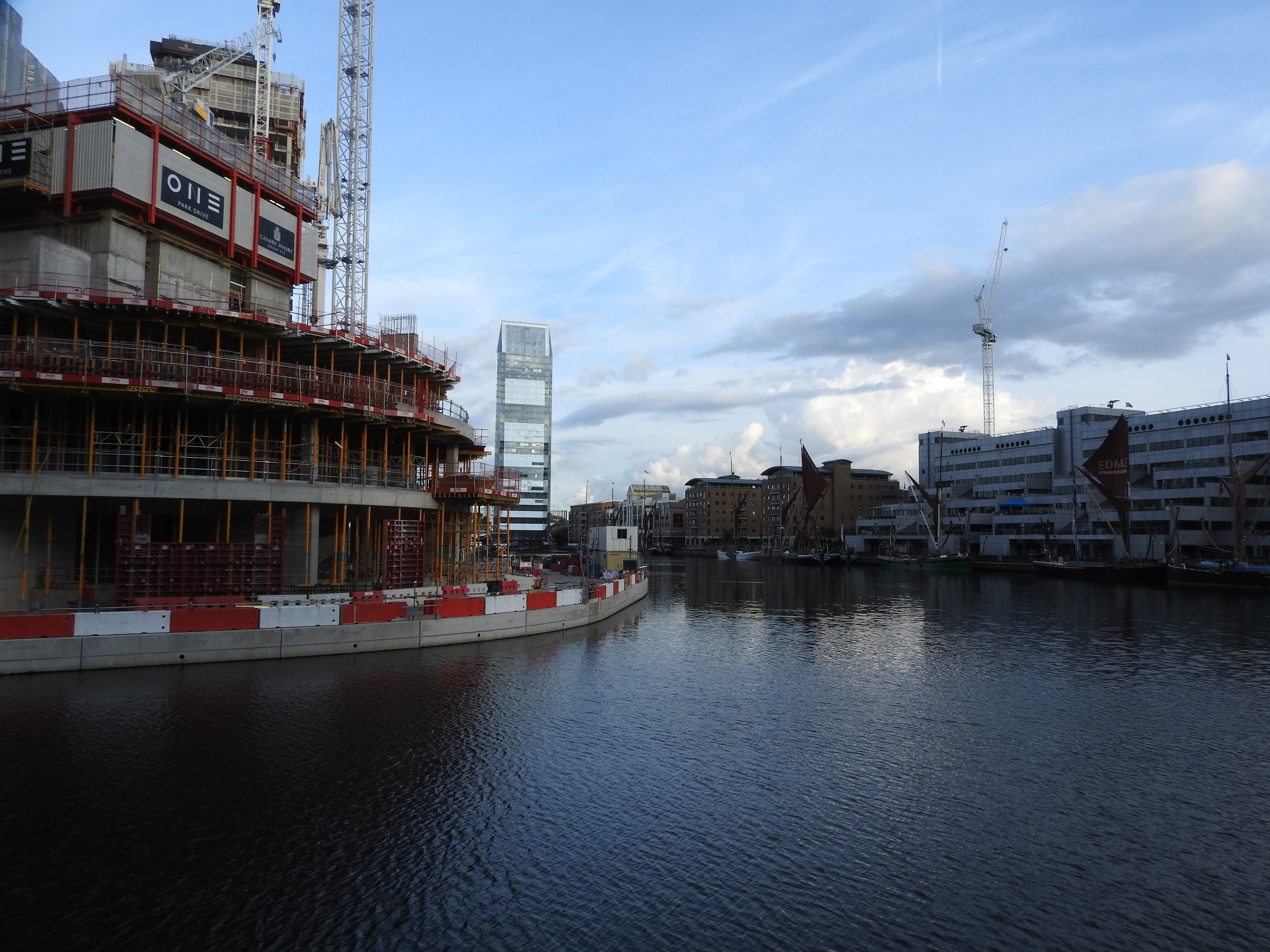
West India Docks, South Dock by South Quays, September 2017

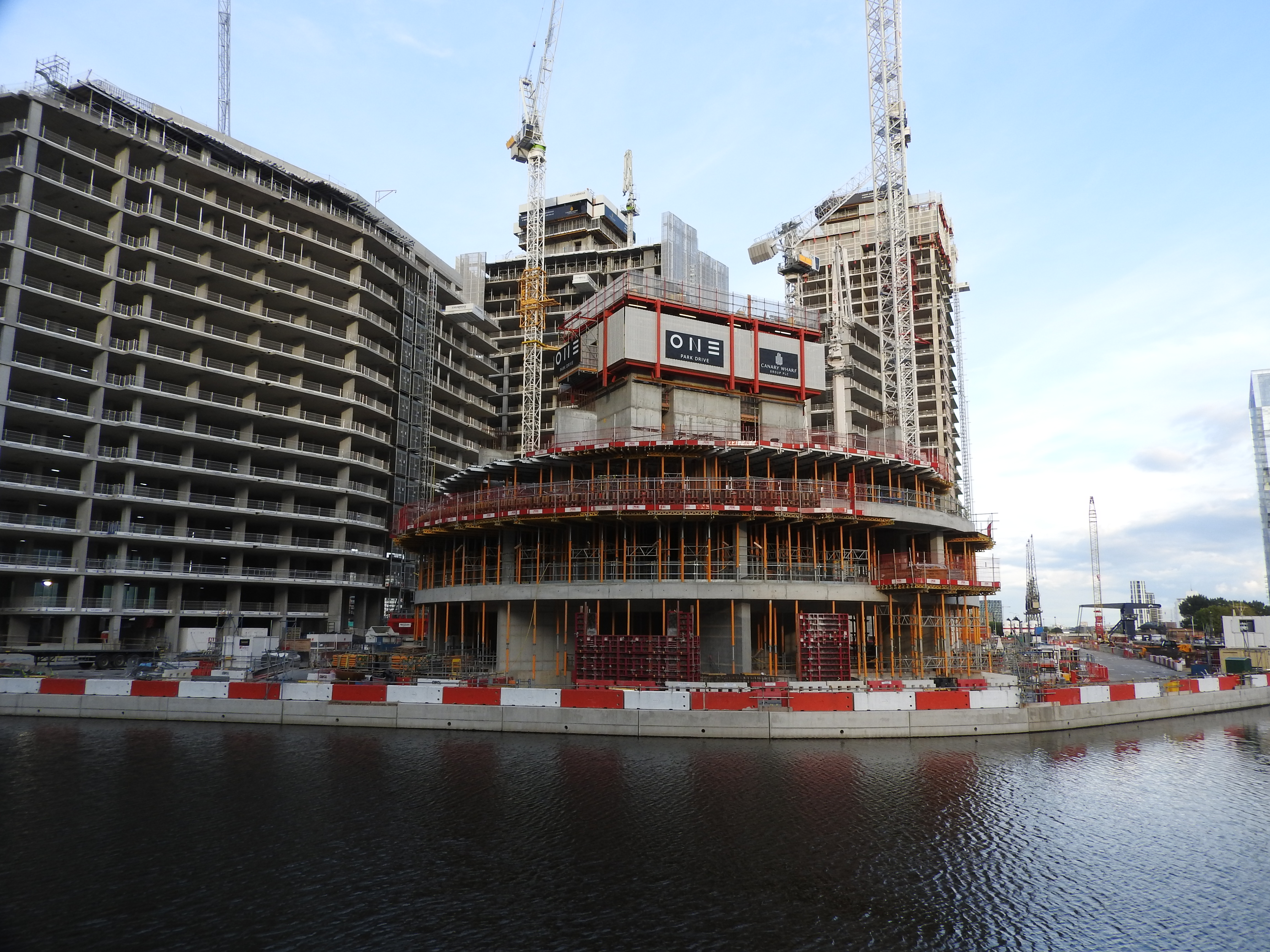
West India Docks, South Dock by South Quays, September 2017

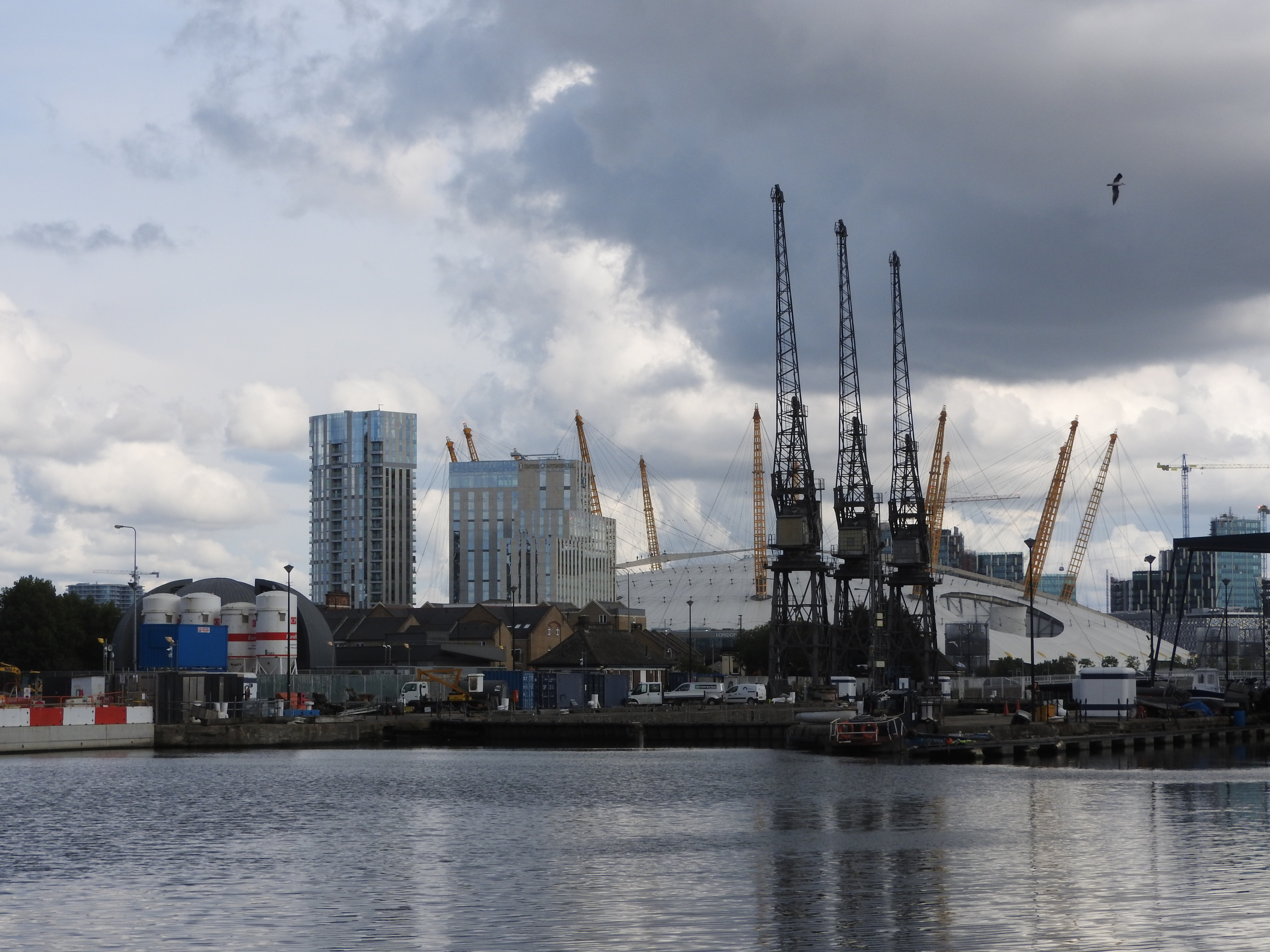
West India Docks, South Dock by South Quays, September 2017

== See also ==
- British West Indies
- London Museum Docklands
