= City Canal =

Former canal excavated across the Isle of Dogs in east London

Coordinates: 51°30′06″N 0°01′01″W

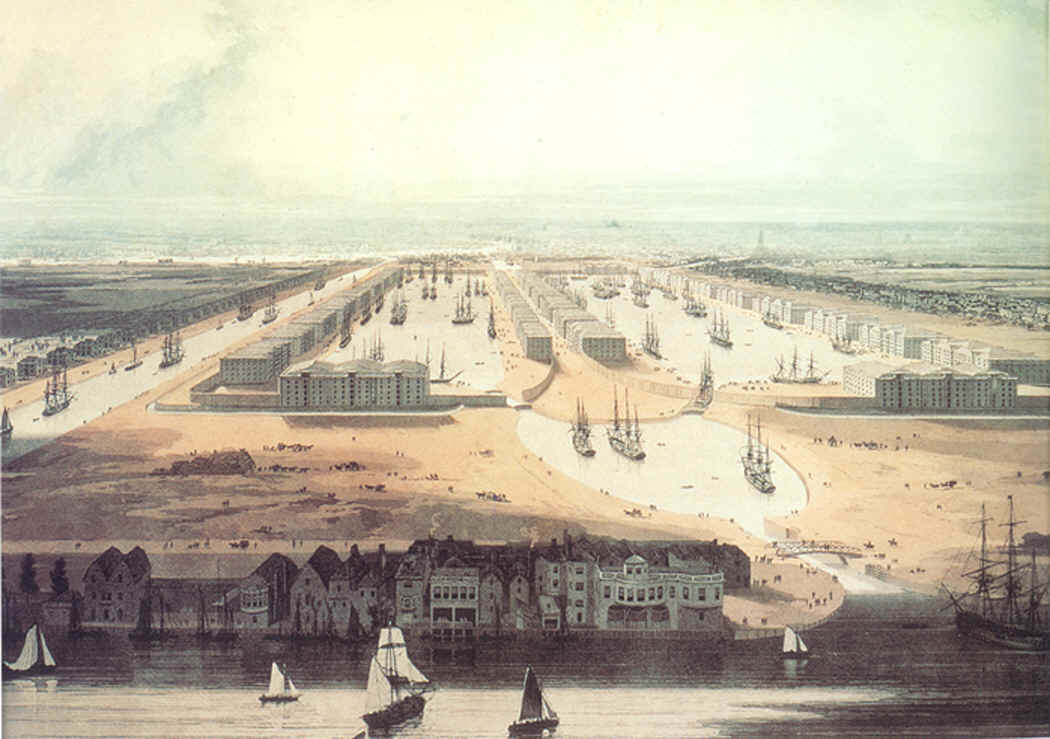
- An 1802 painting of the completed West India Docks. The City Canal is to the left of the painting. The view is looking west towards the City of London
- Interactive map of City Canal

Specifications
- Locks: 2
- Status: incorporated into docks

History
- Date of act: 1799
- Date of first use: 1805

Geography
- Start point: Isle of Dogs
- Connects to: River Thames

The City Canal was a short, and short-lived, canal excavated across the Isle of Dogs in east London, linking two reaches of the River Thames. Today, it has been almost completely reconstructed to form the South Dock of the West India Docks.

== History ==
=== Projection and planning ===
The Port of London Improvement and City Canal Act 1799 (39 Geo. 3. c. lxix) allowed the City of London Corporation to construct a canal from Limehouse Reach to Blackwall Reach, across the Isle of Dogs. It was intended to provide a short cut for sailing ships, to save them travelling around the south of the Isle of Dogs to access the wharves in the upper reaches of the river. If winds were unfavourable, this journey could take some time. The idea had been suggested by Ralph Walker in 1796. The West India merchants employed him as an engineer, and with assistance from William Jessop, John Foulds and George Dance, who was the City of London's surveyor, he produced the detailed plans which enabled the act of Parliament to be obtained. Jessop was appointed as engineer with Walker as resident engineer, in August 1799, but Walker departed in 1802 after a disagreement with Jessop following a structural failure of part of the works. The canal was 3,710 feet (1,130 m) long with a surface width of 173 feet (53 m) and a depth of 45 feet (14 m). The two locks were 193 by 45 feet (59 by 14 m), with the floors built as inverted arches. The lock walls were 6 feet (1.8 m) thick, built of bricks with a stone facing. The depth over the lock cills varied between 20 and 24 feet (6.1 and 7.3 m) at high tide, allowing ships of up to 500 tons burden to use the canal. Banks 12 feet (3.7 m) high had to be built, because the high tide level was above that of the surrounding land, and the tops were 6 feet (1.8 m) above water level. The surrounding land also had to be raised to the same height.

=== Construction ===
One of the major contractors was John Dyson Jr., who was based at Newington near Bawtry in South Yorkshire at the time. He was awarded a contract for excavation of the canal in 1800, and another for gravel extraction from 1801 to 1805. A third contract, for excavation of the west lock was awarded in 1803. He was working on the lock walls in December 1802, and had moved his family to Mile End by this date. John Torr Foulds acted as assistant engineer for part of this period, from 1800 to 1802. James Spedding was employed in 1805 to construct coffer dams to allow the wing walls at the ends of the canal to be built. A dam he had built in the previous year for the East India Dock had partially failed after four weeks, but had been repaired. The problem was one of design rather than bad workmanship, and the City Canal dam worked successfully. The canal was completed in 1805 (officially opened on 9 December that year), having incorporated at its western end the Breach Dockyard, a mast and timber laying dock formed around a large linear pond. The canal cost £168,813, including the acquisition of land.

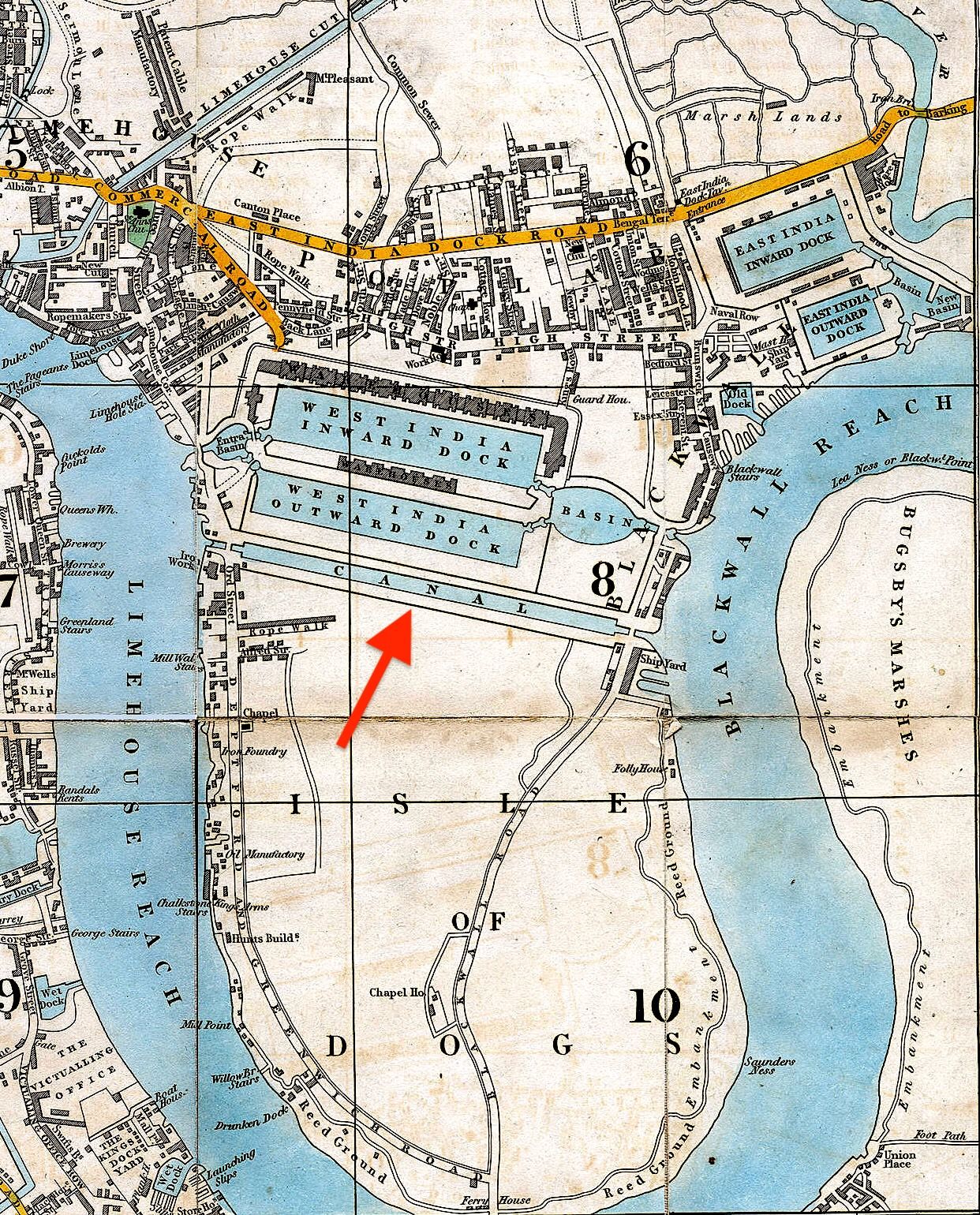
Map of the Isle of Dogs showing the City Canal (G.F. Crutchley, 1831)l

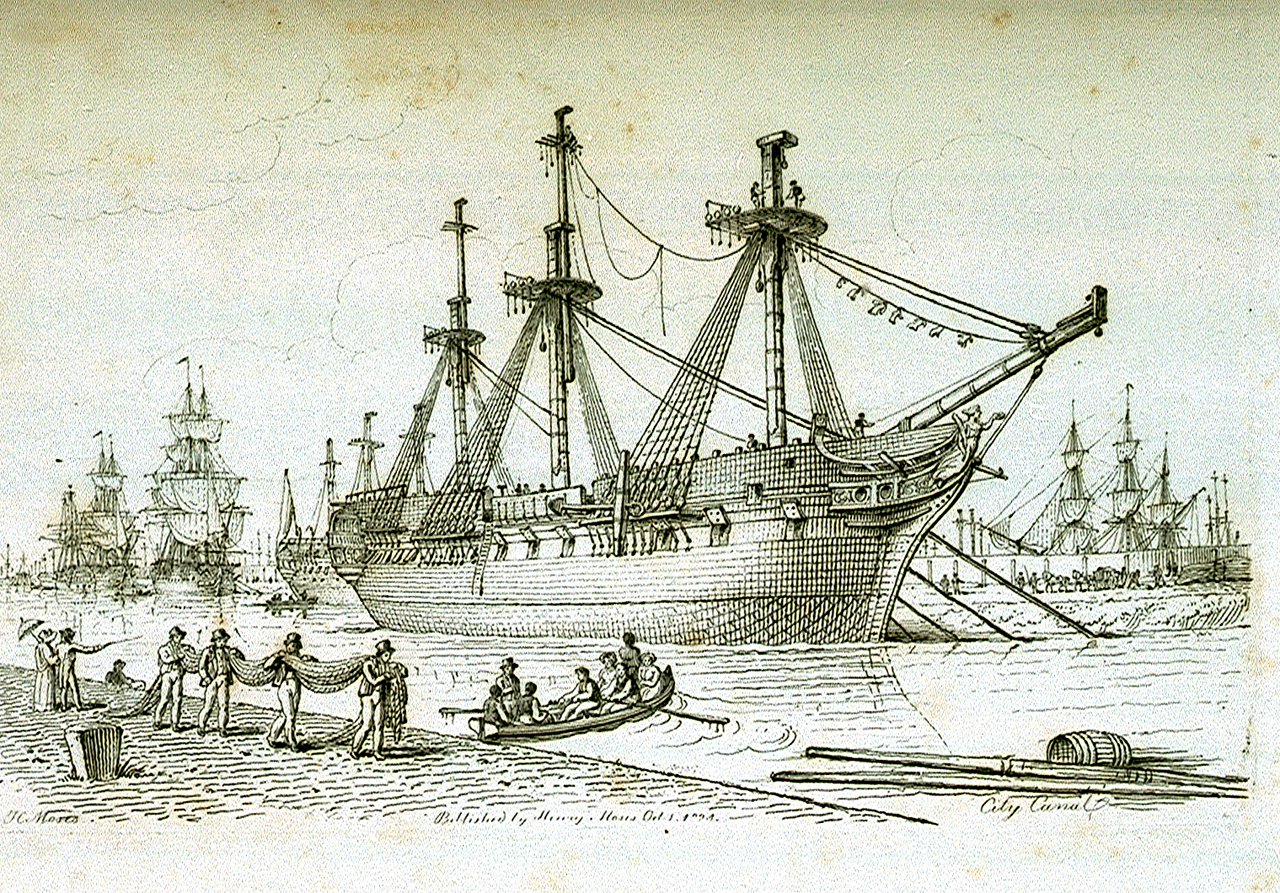
East Indiamen at City Canal, circa 1824

=== Commercial failure ===
From the outset the canal operated at a loss and it could never pay its way. The City of London had undertaken to charge no canal dues for the first three years. Despite these favourable conditions only 7,597 vessels used it in the first 12 months, of which only 1,647 were masted. Had they paid dues, the amount raised would not have covered the running costs. The reasons for the canal's failure were twofold. First, it had been built to relieve congestion, but the simultaneous building of wet docks in the Port of London obviated the need for a good many ships to continue anchoring in the open river. It meant improved transit times and so the short cut across the Isle of Dogs, though it avoided a three-mile detour, only saved two hours. "Had river congestion not simultaneously been relieved by dock accommodation, the canal might have proved a success". A second, and more potent cause, was the introduction of steam ships, including steam tugs, which could tow any ship up and down the river irrespective of the tide. "It was undoubtedly the steamer which killed the Isle of Dogs Canal as a commercial proposition". Space on the canal was rented out for laying up dismantled ships: it made more revenue than the through-traffic.

The City Canal was an early instance of a public investment project since it was undertaken by the City of London (as conservator of the River Thames) but built with money advanced by the Consolidated Fund. Yet, between them, the City and HM Treasury allowed the drain on the public finances to continue for almost 25 years before selling the canal, which was obstructed by strongly entrenched private interests. Eventually, in 1829, it was sold for £120,000 to the West India Dock Company, owner of the adjacent West India Docks, who made it into their South Dock.

=== Dock ===
The company bought it mainly to prevent it from falling into other hands. Proposals for collier docks immediately south of the City Canal, and the opening of the St Katharine Docks in 1828, had heightened the company's awareness of the threat represented by other dock interests. They added a timber dock to the south of the canal in 1832–3, the last major building work at the docks for 20 years.

Some 30 years later (1866–70), in a scheme managed by engineer Sir John Hawkshaw, the canal was enlarged, the entrances were widened, and the complex was renamed the South West India Dock, later known as South Dock.

In 1926 it was decided that the South Dock should be connected to the West India import and export docks and to the Millwall Dock. The developments - a new South Dock east entrance lock and three passages to link the Millwall, South, Export and Import Docks - were divided into four contracts, and were completed in 1931 at a final cost of £1,311,981 for the dock works, considerably improving access to the docks.

== Today ==
South Dock regularly plays host to medium-sized military vessels visiting London as it is the furthest point upstream that they can be turned around - courtesy of the reconstruction worked carried out in 1926-1931. There is no longer a route for vessels across the Isle of Dogs - only the reconstructed eastern entrance remains.

== Bibliography ==
- Hobhouse, Hermione (1994). "The West India Docks: Historical development, Survey of London: volumes 43 and 44: Poplar, Blackwall and Isle of Dogs". British History Online.
- Skempton, Sir Alec; et al. (2002). A Biographical Dictionary of Civil Engineers in Great Britain and Ireland: Vol 1: 1500 to 1830. Thomas Telford. ISBN 0-7277-2939-X.
- Stern, Walter M. (1952). "The Isle of Dogs Canal. A Study in Early Public Investment". The Economic History Review (New Series). 4 (3): 359–371. JSTOR 2599428.
