= North Greenwich Pier =

Pier on the River Thames in London

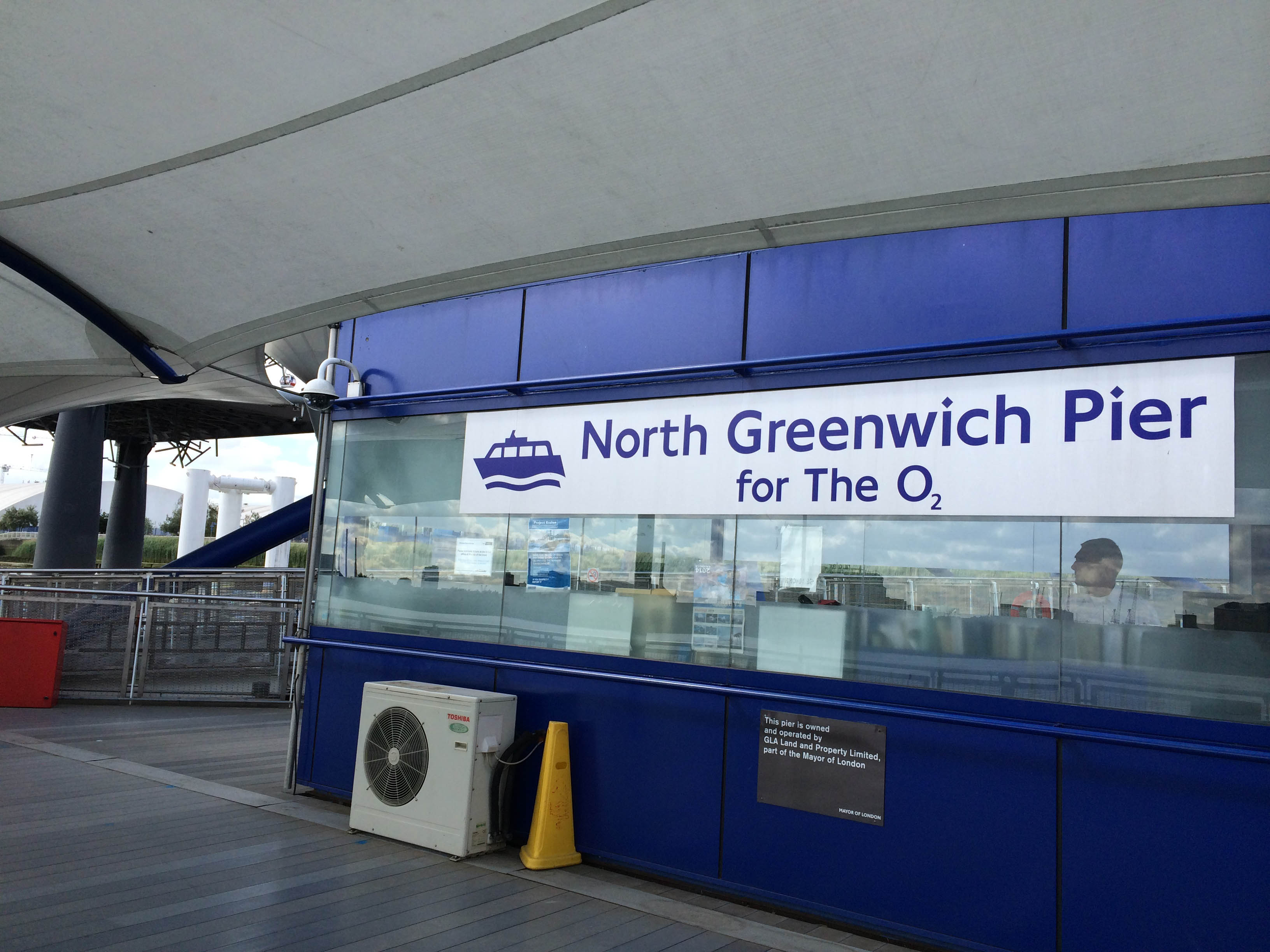
- Type: River bus and tourist/leisure services
- Location: River Thames, London, England
- Coordinates: 51.502189°N 0.009056°E
- Owner: London River Services
- Operator: Uber Boat by Thames Clippers

History
- Location within Royal Borough of Greenwich

North Greenwich Pier is a pier on the River Thames, London, England. It is situated on the Greenwich Peninsula in south-east London, to the east of The O_{2}. The pier was formerly named QEII Pier after Queen Elizabeth II.

== History ==
North Greenwich Pier was originally built in the 1880s as a coaling jetty for the former Greenwich gasworks before this closed in the late 1980s. Most of the original jetty was demolished in 1997 to make way for the new passenger pier; however eight of the original cast iron caisson columns were retained to secure the new floating pier. Antony Gormley's 'Quantum Cloud' statue stands on the downstream group of four caissons.

== Design ==
The new pier was designed by architect Richard Rogers Partnership with Beckett Rankine as the engineer and Costain as main contractor. The most striking feature of the pier is its 87metre long, 160tonne, bowstring canting brow which, unusually, is supported on three bearings.

== Services ==
The pier is served by river boat services operated by Uber Boat by Thames Clippers, including:

- a regular commuter catamaran service, from Barking Riverside and Woolwich (Royal Arsenal) Pier into central London, via Greenwich, Canary Wharf and Tower to the London Eye.
- the fast The O_{2} Express service
- A replacement boat service to a pier near East India DLR station when the London Underground Jubilee line is closed for engineering works.

== Connections ==
- North Greenwich tube station
- North Greenwich bus station
- IFS Cloud Cable Car

Preceding station	London River Services	Following station
Greenwich Pier towards Battersea Power Station Pier	RB1	Royal Wharf Pier towards Barking Riverside Pier
Greenwich Pier towards Putney Pier	RB6	Royal Wharf Pier towards Barking Riverside Pier
