= Millbank Pier =

Pier on the River Thames

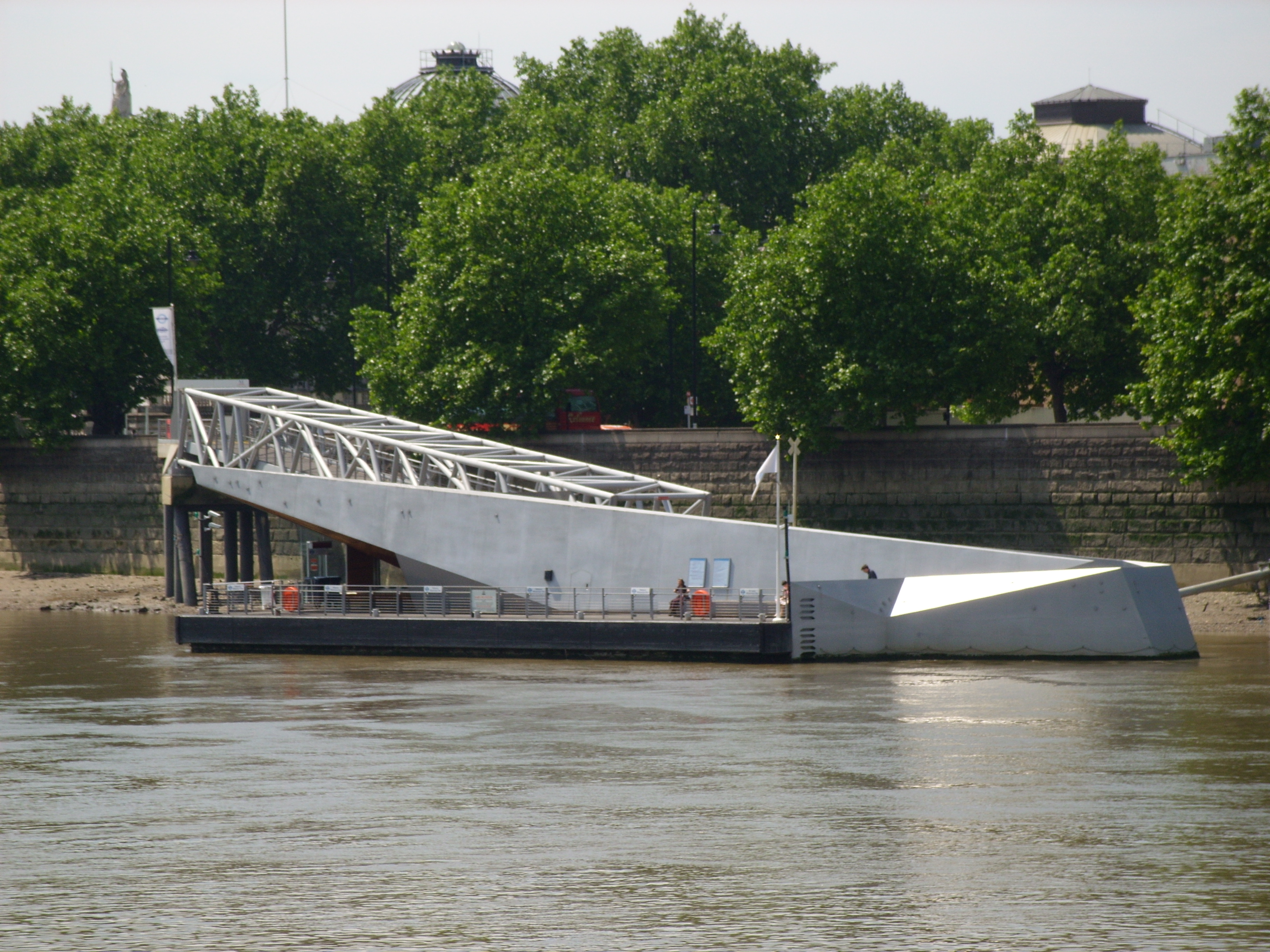
- Millbank Pier
- Type: River bus services
- Location: River Thames, London, UK
- Coordinates: 51.491864°N 0.124992°W
- Owner: London River Services
- Operator: Uber Boat by Thames Clippers

History
- Location within City of Westminster

Millbank Pier is a pier on the west bank of the River Thames, in London, United Kingdom. It is served by boats operated by Uber Boat by Thames Clippers under licence from London River Services and is situated between Lambeth Bridge and Vauxhall Bridge on Millbank. It is accessed from a point adjacent to Millbank Tower and the Tate Britain art gallery.

== Services ==
The pier is served by the Tate-to-Tate river bus service and that links the Tate Britain with the Tate Modern Gallery via a Thames boat service.

== Millennium fund ==
Millbank Millennium Pier was opened on 22 May 2003 by London Mayor Ken Livingstone. Its creation was funded by the Millennium Commission as part of the Thames 2000 project, and it was the fifth and last of the new central London piers built with funding from the Millennium Commission (the others being Blackfriars Millennium Pier, Waterloo Millennium Pier, Westminster Millennium Pier and Tower Millennium Pier). The project was part of an integrated transport and regeneration strategy for the Thames led by London's Cross-River Partnership.

== Design and construction ==
The Millbank Millennium Pier was designed by Marks Barfield Architects with engineering and project management provided by Beckett Rankine. The lighting design 'Flash Tidal' was created by artist Angela Bulloch. The pier is notable for its angular, constructivist steel structure. The main contractor was Mowlem with the steel fabrication by K&N Welding and electrical work by Philipsons. The pier has been awarded a number of prizes for its distinctive design, including a RIBA award, a Commendation by the ICE Merit Award judges, and a 2004 D&AD Yellow Pencil Award.

Preceding station	London River Services	Following station
St George Wharf Pier towards Battersea Power Station Pier	RB1	Westminster Millennium Pier towards Barking Riverside Pier
St George Wharf Pier towards Putney Pier	RB6	Westminster Millennium Pier towards Barking Riverside Pier
