= Westminster Millennium Pier =

Pier on the River Thames in London

Westminster Pier
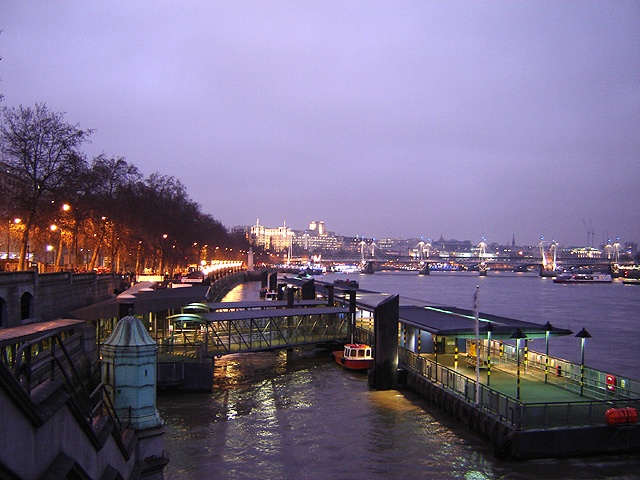
- Type: River tourist/leisure services
- Location: River Thames, London, UK
- Coordinates: 51.501901°N 0.123223°W
- Owner: London River Services
- Operator: Uber Boat by Thames Clippers

History
- Location within Central London

Westminster Pier is a pier on the River Thames, in the City of Westminster in London, England. It is operated by Uber Boat by Thames Clippers and served by various river transport and cruise operators. It is located next to Westminster Bridge on the north bank of the Thames, and is close to one of London's most prominent landmarks, Big Ben.

== Former Westminster Floating Pier ==
The former Westminster Floating Pier existed on the site through the 1950s, running along the Thames between Kew and the London docks. The floating pier acted as a landing point for many Royal water journeys, including the conclusion of Queen Elizabeth II's Commonwealth tour in May 1954.

On 7 February 1955, night watchmen reported that a leak had been found in the pier, causing the middle sections to sink. Workman from the Port of London Authority spent three hours trying to drain the central pontoon of water, with the pier being half submerged by 10am before fully sinking "as Big Ben struck twelve". No one was hurt during the sinking, with the staff having time to evacuate and retrieve important documents.

The sinking of the pier was widely reported on by newspapers and media of the time, with it being parodied in an episode of The Goon Show a week after the incident.

== Construction ==
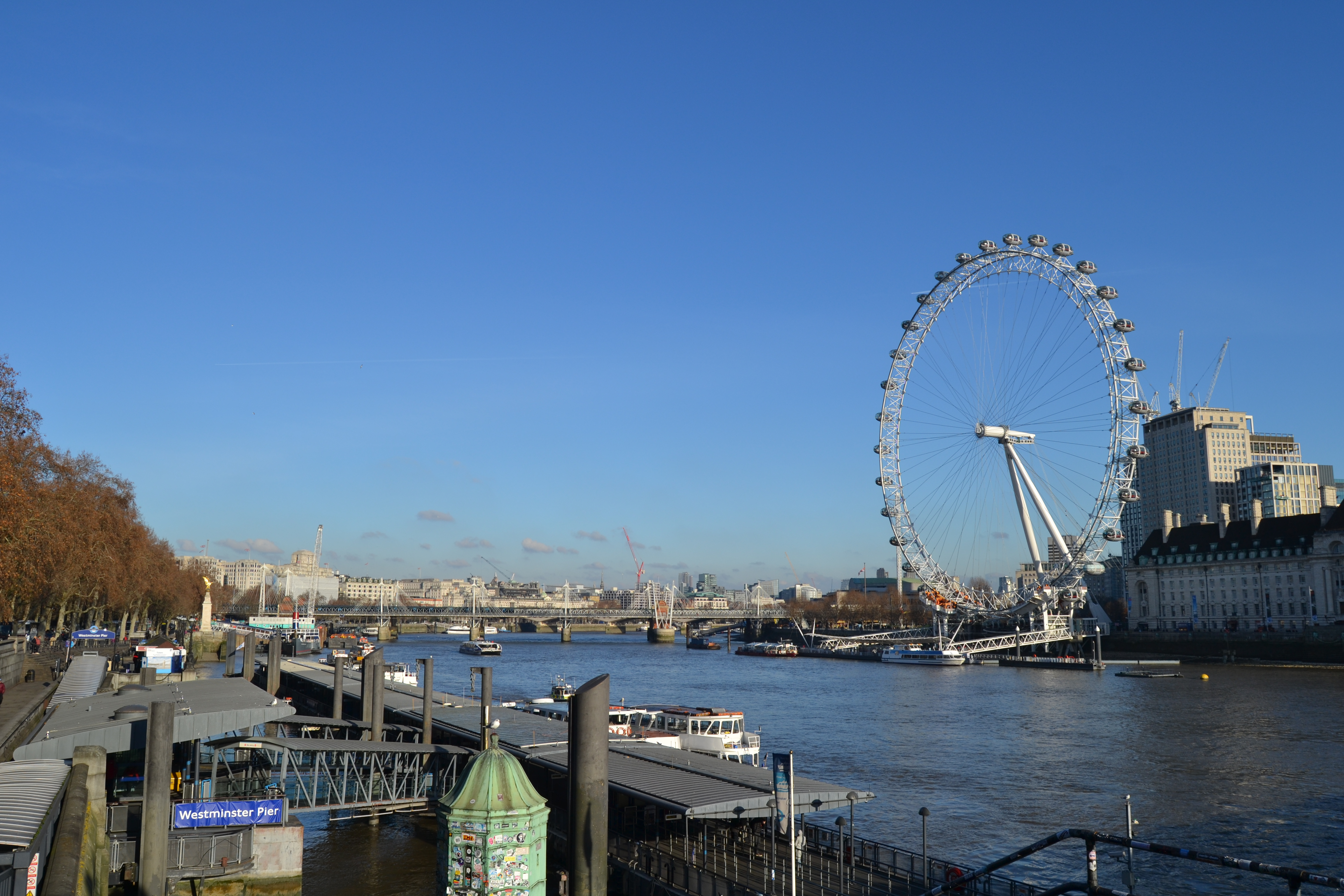
A view from Westminster Pier on the River Thames

The development of Westminster Millennium Pier was funded by the Millennium Commission as part of the Thames project, and it was one of five new piers opened in 2000 by the Commission on the Thames (the others being Blackfriars Millennium Pier, London Eye Pier, Tower Millennium Pier and Millbank Millennium Pier). Its creation was funded by the project as part of an integrated transport and regeneration strategy for the Thames led by London's Cross River Partnership.

== Services ==
The pier is served by various services including:

- Thames River Services between Westminster, Tower Bridge Quay, Greenwich Pier and the Thames Flood Barrier (Pre-booked groups can disembark at Barrier Gardens Pier.)
- City Cruises leisure cruises between Westminster and Greenwich Pier
- Circular Cruise Westminster to St Katharine's Circular
- Thames River Boats cruises to Hampton Court Palace

== Connections ==
- Westminster tube station

== Local attractions ==
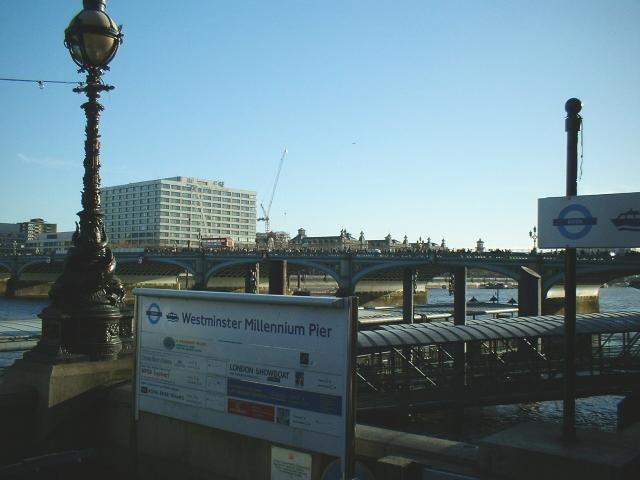
Entrance to the Westminster Pier

=== North bank ===
- Big Ben and the Palace of Westminster
- Westminster Abbey and St. Margaret's, Westminster
- Churchill Museum and Cabinet War Rooms
- The Boudica statue

=== South bank ===
- London Eye
- Sea Life London Aquarium
- Florence Nightingale Museum

== Lines ==
Preceding station	London River Services	Following station
Millbank Pier towards Battersea Power Station Pier	RB1	London Eye Pier towards Barking Riverside Pier
Millbank Pier towards Putney Pier	RB6	London Eye Pier towards Barking Riverside Pier
Terminus	Westminster to Greenwich Express Service	London Eye Pier towards Greenwich Pier

Map of Thames piers in London = TfL piers = Other operators' piers
