= London Eye Pier =

Pier on the River Thames

London Eye (Waterloo) Pier
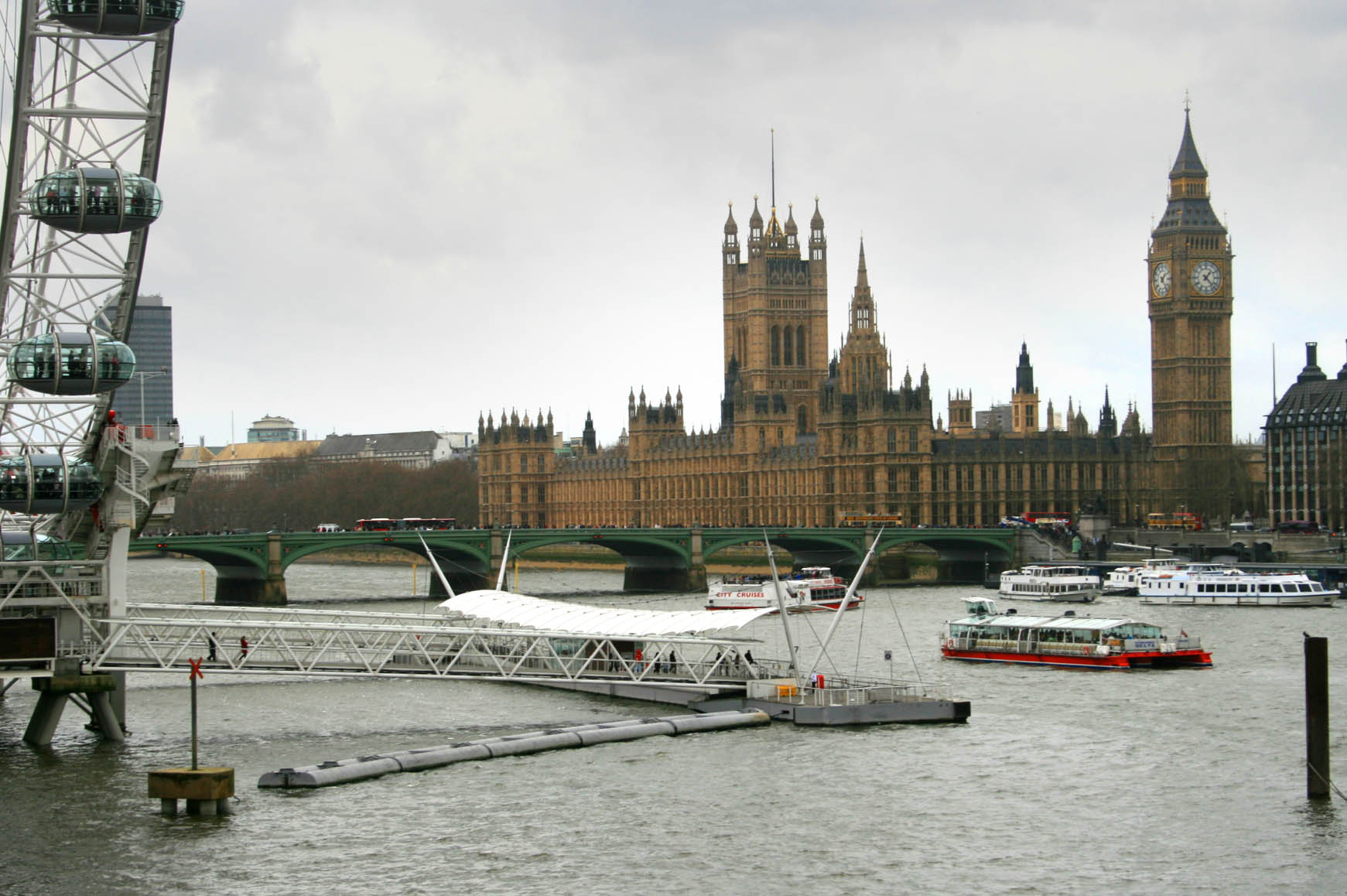
- Type: River bus and tourist/leisure services
- Location: River Thames, London, UK
- Coordinates: 51.50341°N 0.120527°W
- Owner: Merlin Entertainments
- Operator: Uber Boat by Thames Clippers

History
- Location within Central London

The London Eye (Waterloo) Pier is directly in front of the London Eye ferris wheel on the South Bank of the River Thames in Central London, England. It was opened as the Waterloo Millennium Pier in 2000.

It is served by various river transport and cruise operators.

It should not be confused with the former Waterloo Police Pier, on the opposite side of the river on Victoria Embankment next to Waterloo Bridge, which has since been renamed the Tower Lifeboat Station and has been the base for the RNLI's Thames lifeboat service since 2006.

== Construction ==
The pier was designed by Beckett Rankine and Marks Barfield Architects and built by Tilbury Douglas, principally to act as a collision protection system for the London Eye.

It was one of five new piers opened in 2000 on the Thames funded by the Millennium Commission as part of the Thames 2000 project (the others being Blackfriars Millennium Pier, Millbank Millennium Pier, Tower Millennium Pier, and Westminster Millennium Pier), as part of an integrated transport and regeneration strategy for the Thames led by London's Cross River Partnership.

== Services ==
The pier is served by various services including:

- Commuter boat services between Battersea Power Station and Barking Riverside and between Putney and Royal Wharf during off peak hours in the eastbound direction only (Uber Boat by Thames Clippers)
- Summer leisure cruises between Westminster and Greenwich (City Cruises)
- Speedboat tour cruises to Canary Wharf and Thames Barrier (Thames Rockets)

== Connections ==
- Waterloo tube station and London Waterloo station

== Local attractions ==
- London Eye
- Sea Life London Aquarium
- Florence Nightingale Museum
- Big Ben
- South Bank arts precinct
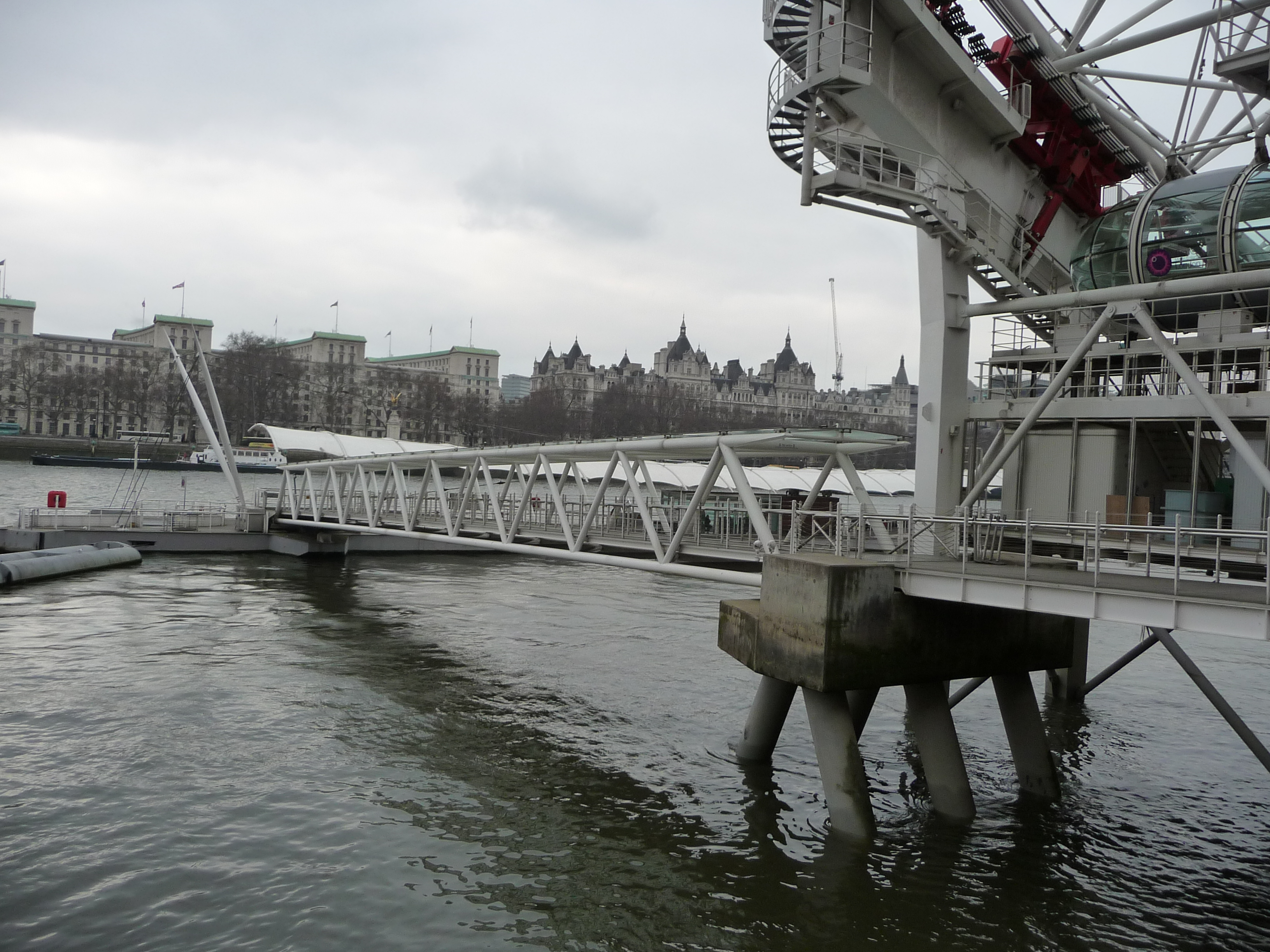

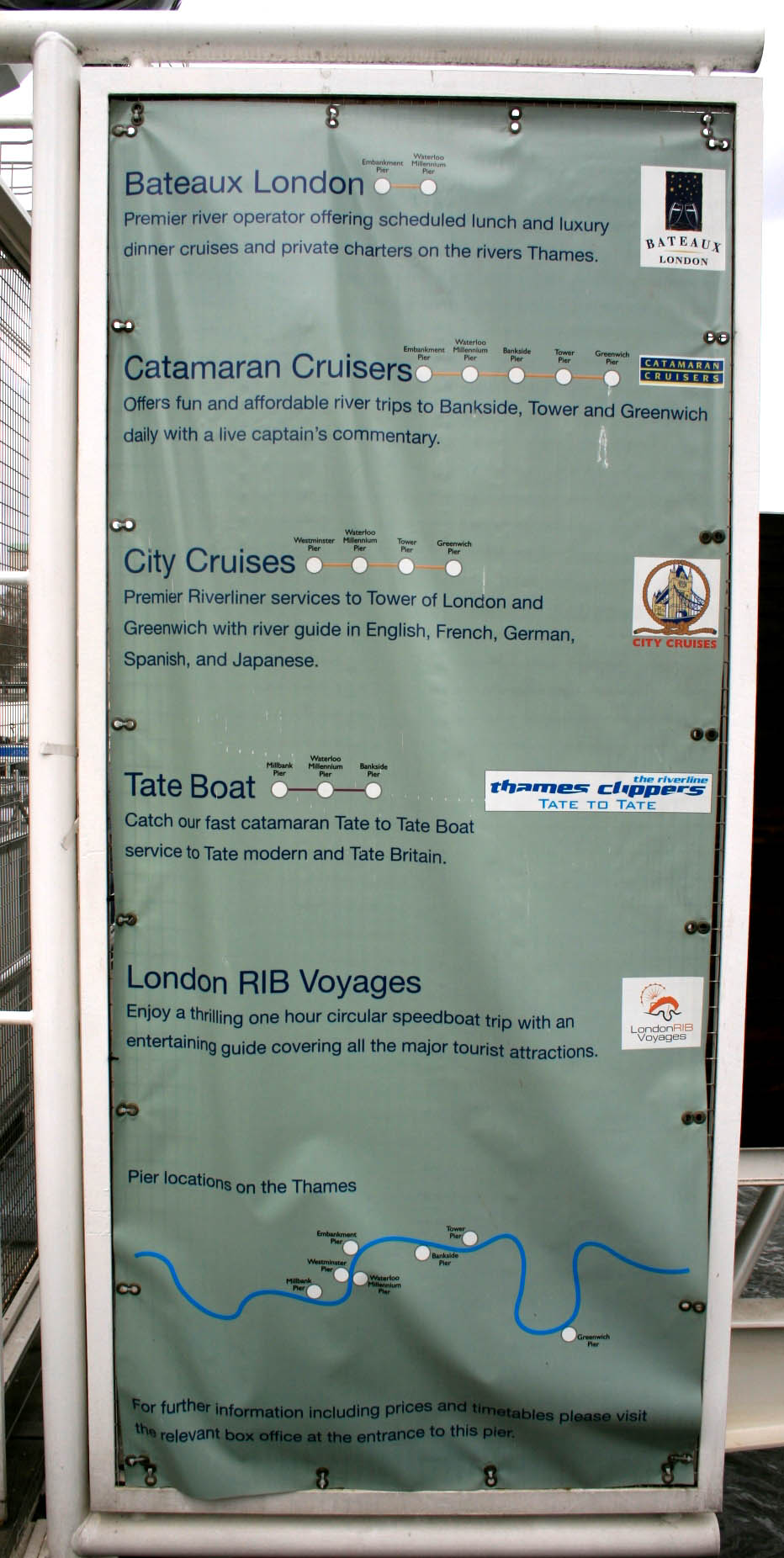

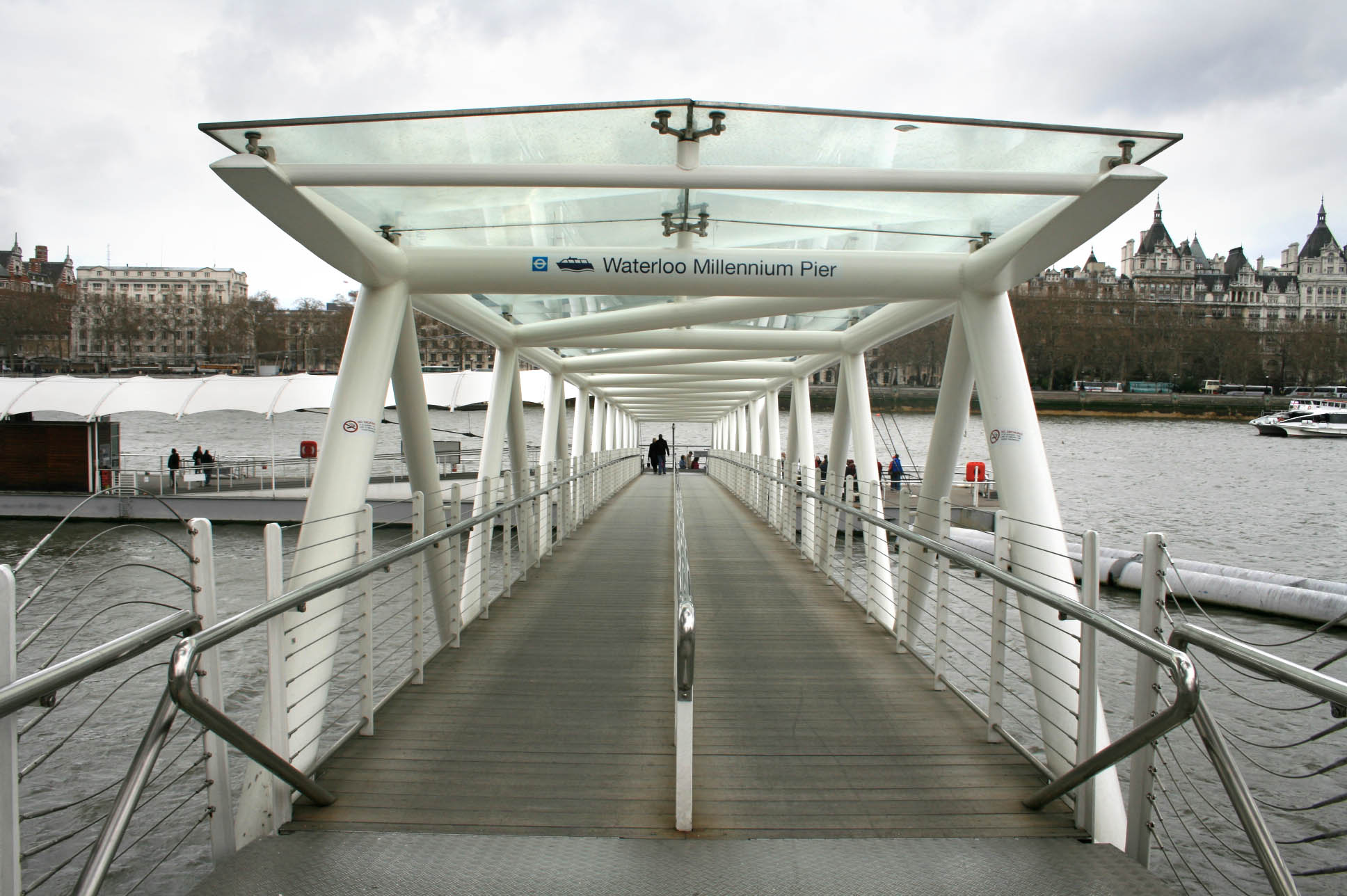

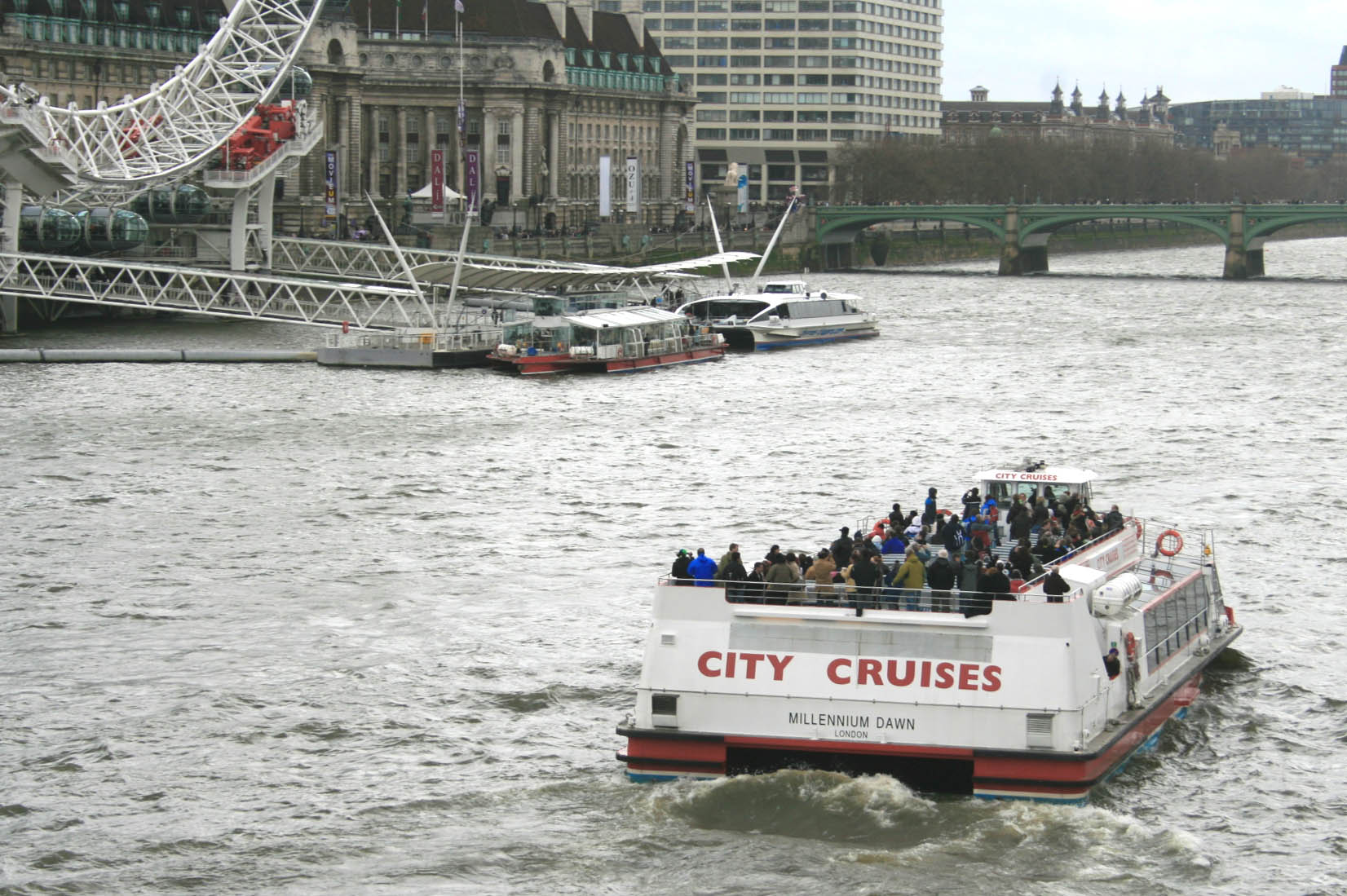

== Lines ==
Preceding station	London River Services	Following station
Westminster Millennium Pier towards Battersea Power Station Pier	RB1	Embankment Pier towards Barking Riverside Pier
Westminster Millennium Pier towards Putney Pier	RB6	Embankment Pier towards Barking Riverside Pier
Westminster Millennium Pier Terminus	Westminster to Greenwich Express Service	Tower Millennium Pier towards Greenwich Pier
