= Thames Clippers =

London river bus operator

Uber Boat by Thames Clippers
- London River Services

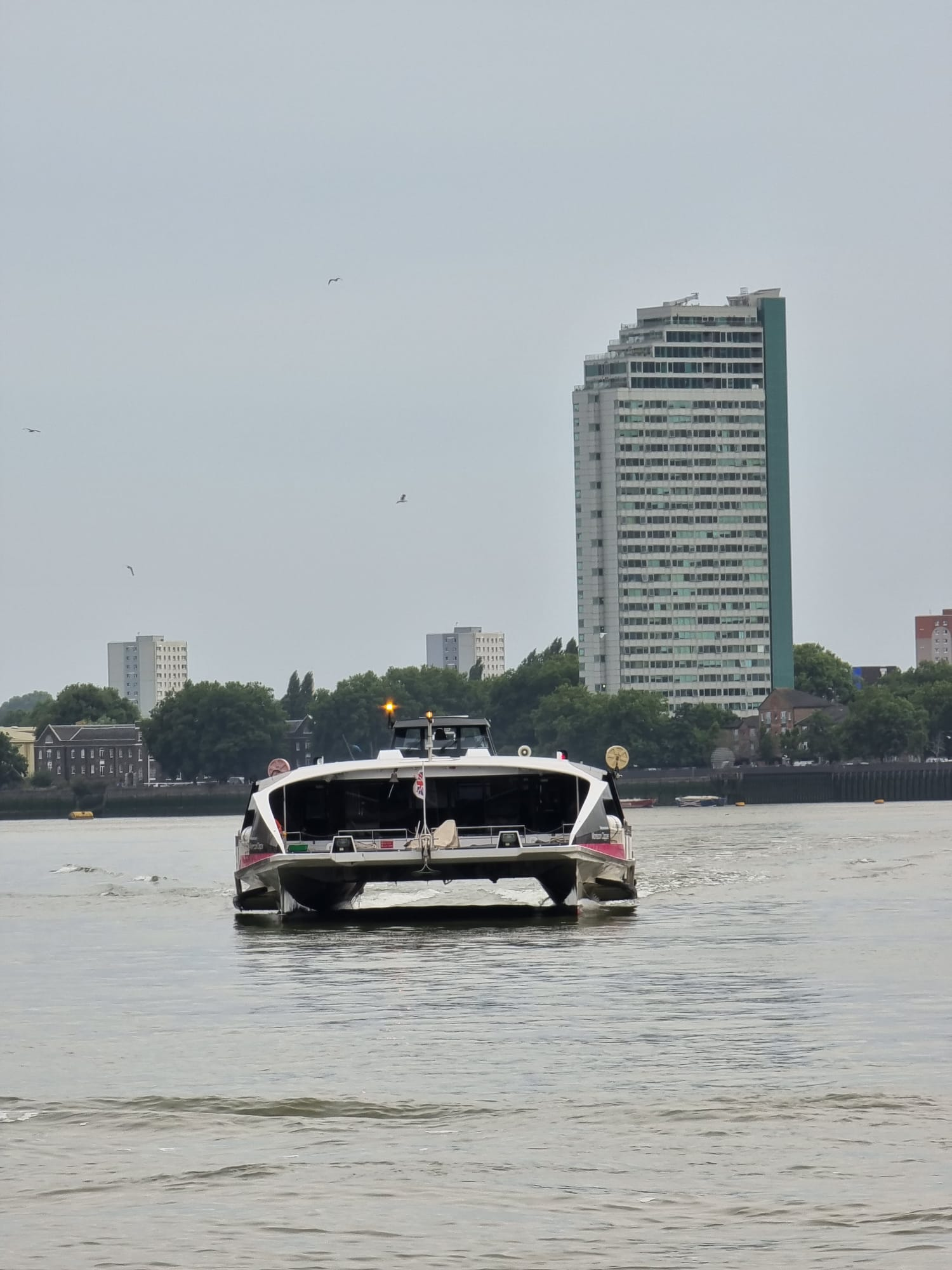
- The Monsoon Clipper near Greenland (Surrey Quays) Pier
- Locale: London, England
- Waterway: River Thames
- Transit type: River bus and tourist/leisure services
- Owner: Northleaf Capital Partners
- Began operation: 24 May 1999; 27 years ago
- No. of lines: 3
- No. of vessels: 25
- No. of terminals: 24
- Website: www.thamesclippers.com

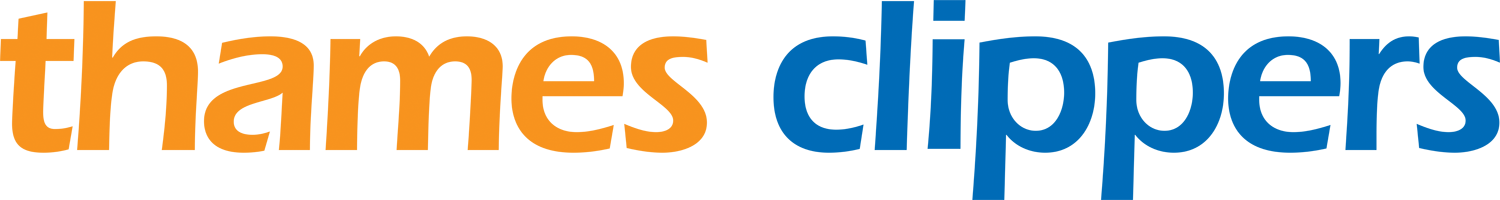
Thames Clippers logo, pre-Uber partnership

Uber Boat by Thames Clippers is a set of river bus services on the River Thames in London, England.

The company operates both commuter services between eastern and Central London and tourist services under licence from London River Services. At present they transport around 10,000 passengers daily on average.

== Company ==
Sean Collins co-founded Thames Clippers in 1999 with partner Alan Woods as Collins River Enterprises. Thames Clippers was then taken over in September 2006 by the Anschutz Entertainment Group (AEG), who promised substantial investment into the company to upgrade the services and to provide a more frequent "hop-on-hop-off" between Central London and The O2, also owned by AEG.

In September 2003, Thames Clippers was awarded a ten-year contract to operate the service.

In 2007 the company purchased six new catamarans to be used on the commuter service in order to carry a large number of passengers in a comfortable environment. In 2015 and 2017, a total of four new 'Hunt Class' catamarans were purchased for use primarily on the RB6 Service.

In July 2020, the company announced a partnership with ride-sharing service Uber, which acquired naming rights to the ferry and rebranding the service as Uber Boat by Thames Clippers.

In April 2022, global private markets investment firm Northleaf Capital Partners acquired a majority interest in Uber Boat by Thames Clippers from AEG, promising to bring new investment.

== Tickets ==
Uber Boat by Thames Clippers operate under licence from Transport for London. The river boat service is now better integrated into the tube and bus ticketing network. From November 2009, Thames Clippers services started to accept Oyster pay as you go on all of its services, which also provides a discount on single and return fares. Contactless payment is also accepted.

A River Roamer ticket, valid for one day, is available from Thames Clippers which allows the holder to hop on and hop off along the banks of the Thames between Putney Pier and Barking Riverside Pier (including the Canary Wharf - Rotherhithe Ferry). An adult single trip fare changes depending on zones. There is a one third discount for holders of valid travelcards (excluding Family River Roamer tickets and fares for The O2 Express).

Special river service season tickets, valid for either 1 week, 1 month, or 1 year, are also available. Discounts for travelcard holders are also available on season tickets. Carnet tickets are also available via the Uber Boat by Thames Clippers tickets app.

Park and Glide tickets are also available which grant access to the car park at The O2, and the River Bus.

== Commuter services ==
=== RB1 ===
During weekday peak times, the service runs from Westminster in the west to Barking Riverside in the east. During off-peak hours the service is extended to Battersea Power Station. Not all services stop at every pier. Stops from west to east:

Pier	Zone	Interchanges	Service notes
Battersea Power Station	Central	Battersea Power Station	Off-peak only, served all day on weekends.
Vauxhall (St George Wharf)	Central	Vauxhall	Off-peak only, served all day on weekends.
Millbank	Central		Off-peak only, served all day on weekends. Intermittent service times
Westminster	Central	Westminster	Eastbound weekday peak services start here
London Eye (Waterloo)	Central	Waterloo	Westbound weekday peak services terminate here, served on weekdays westbound only during peak hours. Intermittent service times
Embankment	Central	Embankment	
Blackfriars	Central	Blackfriars	Weekdays during peak hours only. Intermittent service times
Bankside	Central	Blackfriars	
London Bridge City	Central	London Bridge	
Tower	Central	Tower Hill Tower Gateway Fenchurch Street	
Canary Wharf	Central and East	Canary Wharf Canary Wharf Canary Wharf	
Rotherhithe	East		Selected services stop here
Greenland (Surrey Quays)	East	Canada Water	
Masthouse Terrace	East	Mudchute	
Greenwich	East	Cutty Sark for Maritime Greenwich	
North Greenwich	East	North Greenwich	
Royal Wharf	East	West Silvertown	
Woolwich (Royal Arsenal)	East	Woolwich Arsenal Woolwich	
Barking Riverside	East	Barking Riverside	

=== RB4 ===
Thames Clippers operates the direct cross river Canary Wharf – Rotherhithe Ferry, between Canary Wharf Pier and Rotherhithe Pier at the DoubleTree Docklands in Rotherhithe. The service uses smaller boats than the commuter service but runs at a higher frequency of every 20 minutes and every 10 minutes during peak times. The ferry can be used by guests of the hotel free of charge as well as by passengers not staying at the hotel at a cost.

From March to April 2025, the ferry was temporarily shut down to rebuild the pier, as part of a UK government project to create the first electric cross-river ferry in London, using the new Orbit Clipper. During the works, replacement services ran from Canary Wharf Pier to Greenland (Surrey Quays) Pier. The new wheelchair accessible Rotherhithe Pier opened in April 2025, with the smaller Twinstar continuing to serve the route. The Orbit Clipper is still to be introduced.

Pier	Zone	Interchanges
Canary Wharf	Central and East	Canary Wharf Canary Wharf Canary Wharf
Rotherhithe	East	

=== RB6 ===
Runs every day from Putney to Canary Wharf or North Greenwich, with some services extending to Barking Riverside. Not all services stop at every pier. Stops from west to east:

Pier	Zone	Interchanges	Service notes
Putney	West	Putney Bridge Putney	
Wandsworth Riverside Quarter	West	Wandsworth Town	
St Mary's Wandsworth	West	Clapham Junction	
Chelsea Harbour	West	Imperial Wharf	
Cadogan	West		Intermittent service times
Battersea Power Station	Central	Battersea Power Station	
Vauxhall (St George Wharf)	Central	Vauxhall	
Millbank	Central		Off-peak only, served all day on weekends. Intermittent service times
Westminster	Central	Westminster	
London Eye (Waterloo)	Central	Waterloo	Eastbound only. Intermittent service times
Embankment	Central	Embankment	
Blackfriars	Central	Blackfriars	Weekdays during peak hours only. Intermittent service times
Bankside	Central	Blackfriars	
London Bridge City	Central	London Bridge	
Tower	Central	Tower Hill Tower Gateway Fenchurch Street	
Canary Wharf	Central and East	Canary Wharf Canary Wharf Canary Wharf	
Rotherhithe	East		Selected services stop here
Greenland (Surrey Quays)	East	Canada Water	
Masthouse Terrace	East	Mudchute	
Greenwich	East	Cutty Sark for Maritime Greenwich	
North Greenwich	East	North Greenwich	
Royal Wharf	East	West Silvertown	Limited service
Woolwich (Royal Arsenal)	East	Woolwich Arsenal Woolwich	Limited service
Barking Riverside	East	Barking Riverside	Limited service

=== Trial service to Gravesend ===
In September 2017, Thames Clippers ran a trial commuter service between Gravesend and Central London.
On 4 November 2022, Uber Boat by Thames Clippers announced that they had completed the purchase of Gravesend Town Pier, with an aim to operating long-term River Bus services from the pier within the next 2–3 years.

From 27 July 2024 to 29 September 2024, Thames Clippers will run the service again.

== Visitor/tourist services ==
=== Tate to Tate ===
The Tate to Tate is a ticketed leisure service between the Tate Modern at Bankside Pier and the Tate Britain at Millbank Pier. Passengers travel on the RB1 service on weekdays and the RB2 at weekends. Tickets can be purchased from the Tate galleries in addition to standard options.

=== The O2 Express ===
The O2 Express is an express service from North Greenwich Pier calling at London Bridge City Pier, London Eye (Waterloo) Pier and Battersea Power Station Pier. The service also provides private charters.

== Fleet ==
Thames Clippers operates a fleet of 25 vessels.

Name	Length	Passengers	Type	Builder	Built	Acquired	Image
Saturn Clipper	38 m (125 ft)	230	Hunt Class Mk IV	Wight Shipyard	2026	2026	
Orbit Clipper	25 m (82 ft)	150	Passenger RO-RO	Wight Shipyard	2024	2025	
Mars Clipper	38 m (125 ft)	230	Hunt Class Mk IV	Wight Shipyard	2023	2023	
Celestial Clipper	38 m (125 ft)	230	Hunt Class Mk IV	Wight Shipyard	2023	2023	
Earth Clipper	38 m (125 ft)	230	Hunt Class Mk IV	Wight Shipyard	2023	2023	
Venus Clipper	38 m (125 ft)	220	Hunt Class Mk III	Wight Shipyard	2018	2019	
Jupiter Clipper	35 m (115 ft)	172	Hunt Class Mk II	Wight Shipyard	2017	2017	
Mercury Clipper	35 m (115 ft)	172	Hunt Class Mk II	Wight Shipyard	2017	2017	
Galaxy Clipper	35 m (115 ft)	150	Hunt Class Mk I	Incat	2015	2015	
Neptune Clipper	35 m (115 ft)	150	Hunt Class Mk I	Incat	2015	2015	
Aurora Clipper	38 m (125 ft)	220	River Runner 200 Mk IIB 'Typhoon Class'	BSC Marine	2008	2008	
Meteor Clipper	38 m (125 ft)	220	River Runner 200 Mk IIB 'Typhoon class'	BSC Marine	2008	2008	
Cyclone Clipper	38 m (125 ft)	220	River Runner 200 Mk IIB 'Typhoon Class'	BSC Marine	2007	2007	
Monsoon Clipper	38 m (125 ft)	220	River Runner 200 Mk IIB 'Typhoon Class'	BSC Marine	2007	2007	
Tornado Clipper	38 m (125 ft)	220	River Runner 200 Mk IIB 'Typhoon Class'	BSC Marine	2007	2007	
Typhoon Clipper	38 m (125 ft)	220	River Runner 200 Mk IIB 'Typhoon Class'	BSC Marine	2007	2007	
Hurricane Clipper	38 m (125 ft)	220	River Runner 200 MkII	NQEA	2001	2001	
Moon Clipper	32 m (105 ft)	138	River Runner 150 Mk II	NQEA	2001	2005	
Sun Clipper	32 m (105 ft)	138	River Runner 150 Mk II	NQEA	2001	2005	
Sky Clipper	25 m (82 ft)	62	FBM Hydrocat	FBM	1992	1999	
Star Clipper	25 m (82 ft)	62	FBM Hydrocat	FBM	1992	1999	
Storm Clipper	25 m (82 ft)	62	FBM Hydrocat	FBM	1992	1999	
Twinstar Clipper	19 m (62 ft)	120	Class V	?	1976	2004	
Comet Clipper		12	Executive Launch	?	?	2019	
Orion Clipper		12	Executive Launch	?	?	2016	

== Accidents ==
On 2 May 2004, a woman was killed while waiting for a boat after she was hit by a mooring bollard which had come loose from the Star Clipper at St. Katharine's Pier.

On 4 October 2011 at 7pm, the Moon Clipper hit the Tower Millennium Pier when it was carrying about 50 people. Four people were injured.

On 31 December 2014, Moon Clipper hit a moored vessel, Mercuria, while running light back to Trinity Buoy Wharf. The vessel was then repaired, and returned to service on 5 February 2015.

On 5 December 2016, the Typhoon Clipper collided with the work-boat Alison, resulting in the sinking of the work-boat. The two crew members on the work-boat were taken to hospital.

On 20 September 2022, the Moon Clipper had an engine fire while working on the RB6 service to Putney. No one was hurt, but the vessel was evacuated, and spent a few months in dry-dock being repaired.

== Piers ==
Thames Clippers serves at least 24 piers in London, five of which they own, including St Mary's Wandsworth Pier and Gravesend Town Pier, which they purchased from Gravesham Borough Council in 2022.

== Expansion ==
A Policy Exchange report from 2010 advocated significant expansion in river services on the Thames. The aim of the report is to lead to a "river tube line" being created which would lead to easing of current congestion on London's transport systems, and better quality of travel, at a significantly cheaper price than other options. Opponents note that the river capacity, especially at low tide could mean a reduction of tourist boats (especially at peak commuter times), and turn the Thames into an urban highway which would be detrimental to London. To be feasible, the report calls for better management of river traffic, improved interchange with other public transport modes and expansion of key piers.

The Mayor of London is responsible for the River Concordat group, which is made-up of over forty different organisations including Thames Clippers. The publication, By the River, sets out the strategic vision for improving river transport on the Thames.

Plans were announced in 2018 to expand further east down the river start with a calling at a pier in Silvertown in October 2019 and plans in the future to go to Thamesmead and Barking. Proposals to extend the service westward to newly built piers at Fulham (as part of the Craven Cottage Riverside Stand development), and Hammersmith have met stiff opposition due to the heavy use of that stretch of river by rowing and sailing clubs.

In 2017, Thames Clippers and London Resort signed a memorandum of understanding for the provision of Clipper services between Central London and a proposed theme park located in the Borough of Dartford, east of London, on the south bank of the Thames. The concept included Thames Clipper services between the theme park and a park & ride car park in Tilbury Docks, on the north side of the Thames. plans for the theme park were cancelled in 2022, and London Resort Company Holdings went into administration in March 2023.

== Sponsorship ==
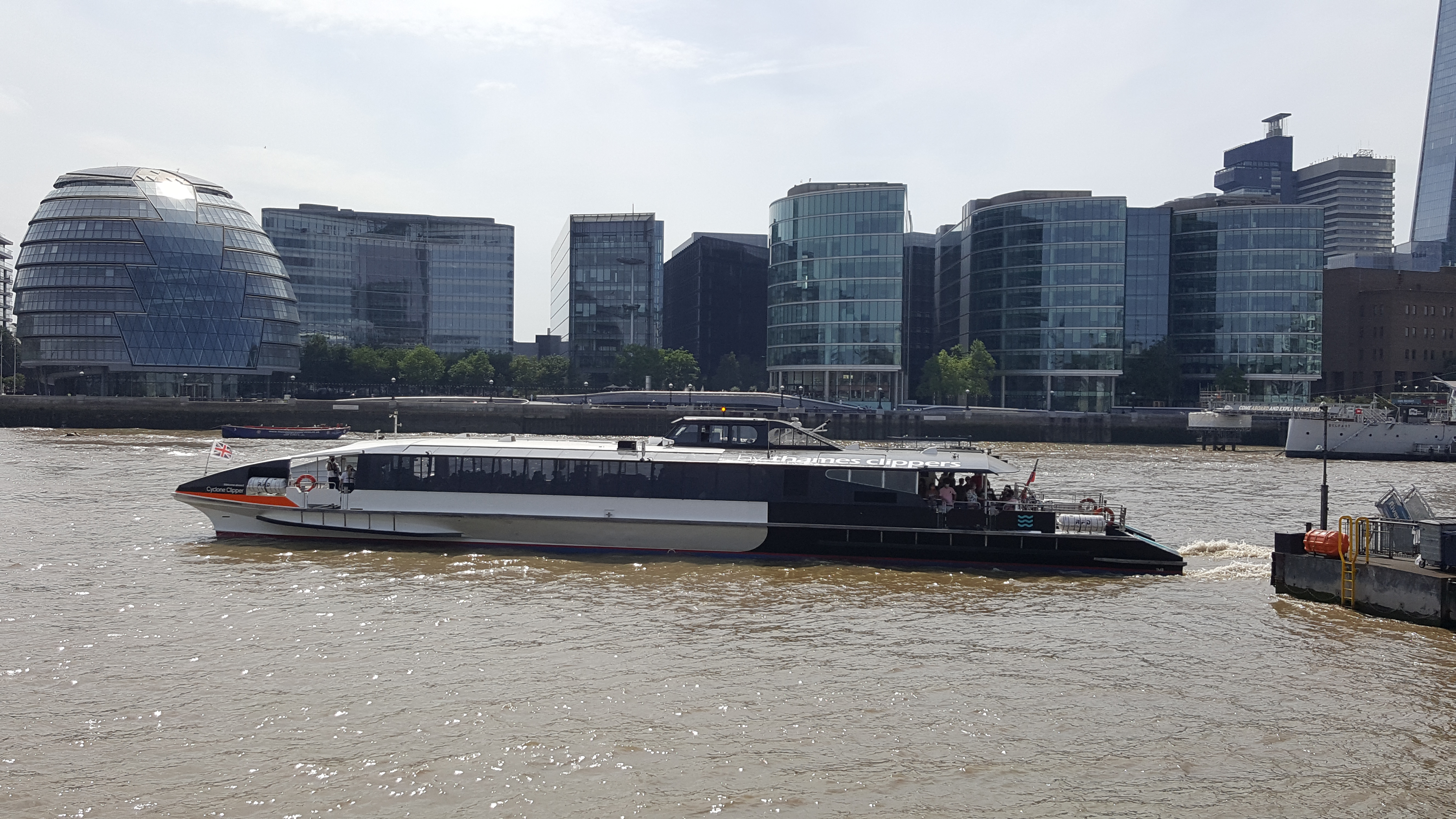
Cyclone Clipper in Uber branding

The first company to enter a partnership with Thames Clippers was NatWest in 2008. The boats were reliveried in black sponsorship stickers displaying the NatWest and Thames Clippers Logo. KPMG won a three-year sponsorship deal in 2011 and sponsored the clippers during the 2012 Olympics and Paralympics. In August 2014, MBNA, the bank holding company, signed a three-year sponsorship deal with Thames Clippers, and introduced a better ticketing system. In June 2020, American company Uber entered a new partnership with Thames Clippers whereby they won naming rights to the service. As of 2020, the service has been rebranded as "Uber Boat by Thames Clippers".
