= Greenwich Pier =

Pier on the River Thames

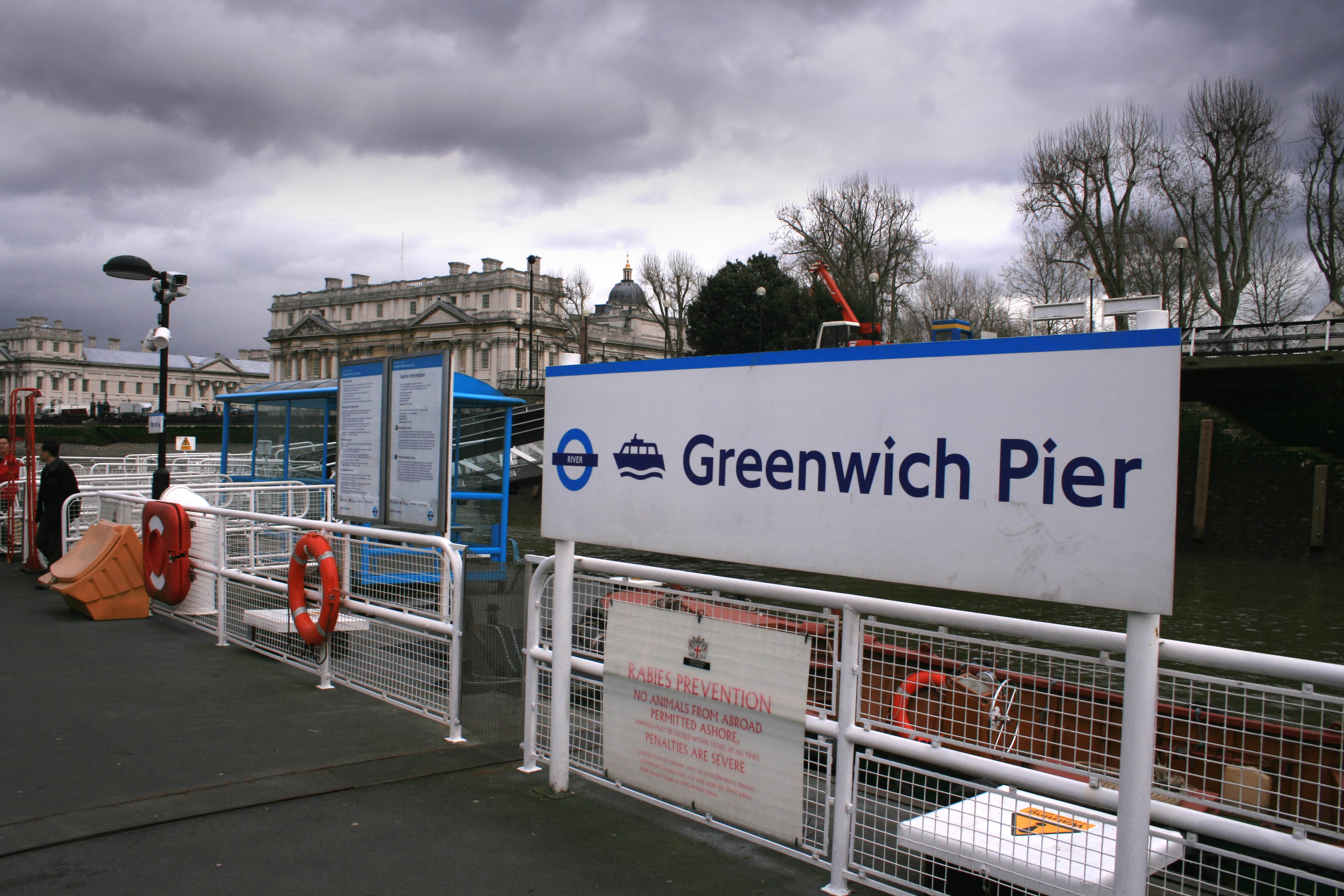
- Type: Working pier. River bus and tourist/leisure services
- Location: River Thames, Greenwich, London
- Coordinates: 51°29′02.48″N 0°0′33.92″W
- Owner: London River Services
- Operator: Uber Boat by Thames Clippers

History
- Opening date: 1836
- Location within Royal Borough of Greenwich

Greenwich Pier movement
The sound of the gangway that connects the pier to the riverbank, moving with the tide. Recorded January 2012.

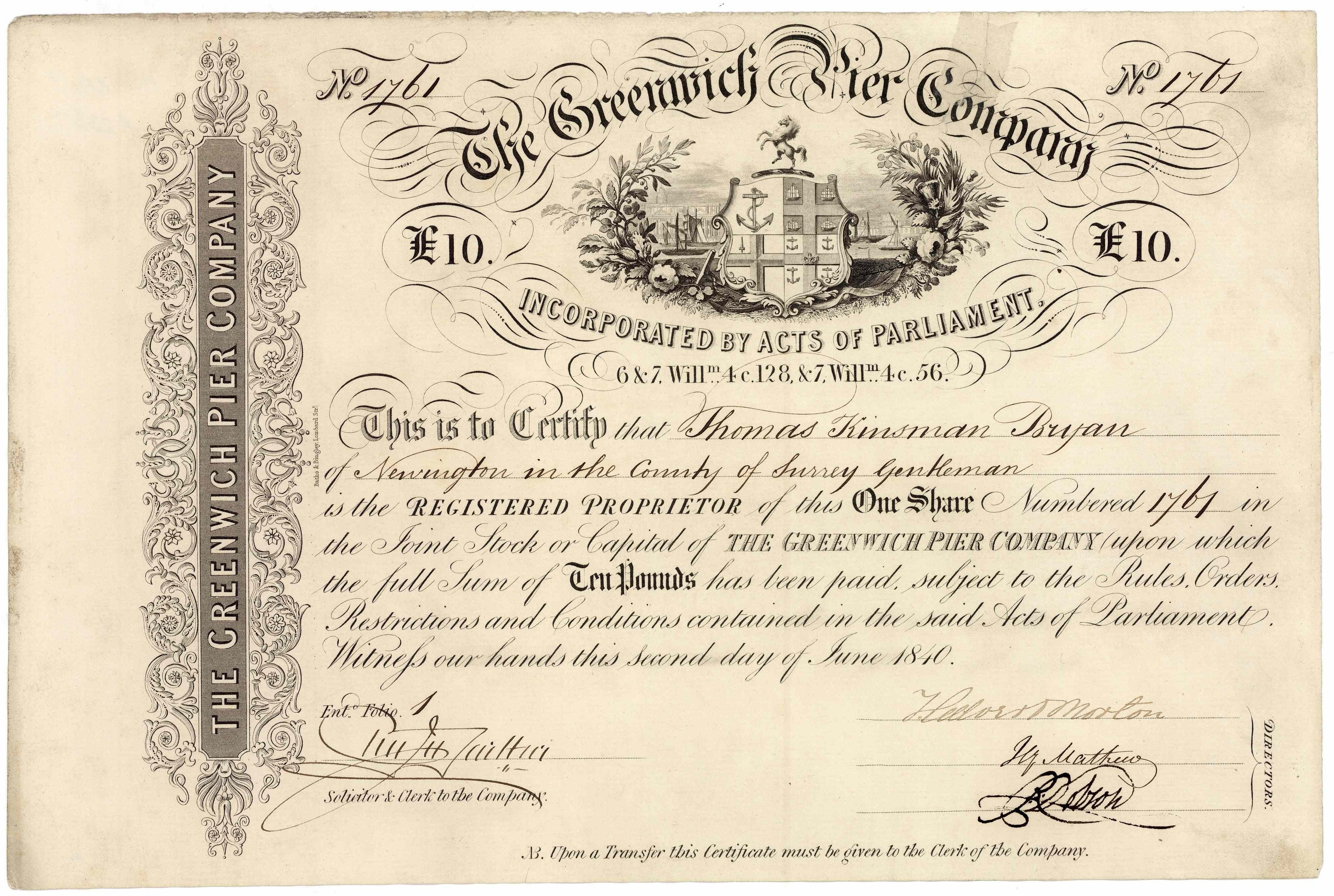
Share of the Greenwich Pier Company, issued 2 June 1840

Greenwich Pier is on the south bank of the River Thames in Greenwich, London. It was built in 1836 to cater for the many paddle steamers that brought visitors on day trips to Greenwich from London further up river. At the time, London's urban area did not extend as far out as Greenwich.

The pier is currently owned by London River Services and is used by various river operators, running public cruise services to and from Central London. It is immediately adjacent to the Cutty Sark and is within easy walking distance of a variety of other popular attractions. It was refurbished in 2004 and again in March 2018.

== Services ==
Greenwich Pier is a major stop for a number of river operators including:

- Uber Boat by Thames Clippers, which operates a commuter catamaran service between Greenwich and Central London, via Embankment, Tower Millennium Pier and Canary Wharf. This service also extends down river to The O_{2} and Barking Riverside Pier.
- Thames River Sightseeing, which operates sightseeing tours between Westminster Pier, Embankment Pier, Festival Pier, Bankside Pier, Tower Bridge Quay and Greenwich Pier. Thames River Sightseeing also operate cruises through the Thames Flood Barrier.
- Viscount Cruises (Campion Launches), which operates a sightseeing cruise on Sunday evenings from Greenwich Pier during May, June, July, August, and September.

== Connections ==
- Cutty Sark for Maritime Greenwich station
- London Buses 188, 199 and N1
- Greenwich Foot Tunnel under the River Thames

== Gallery ==
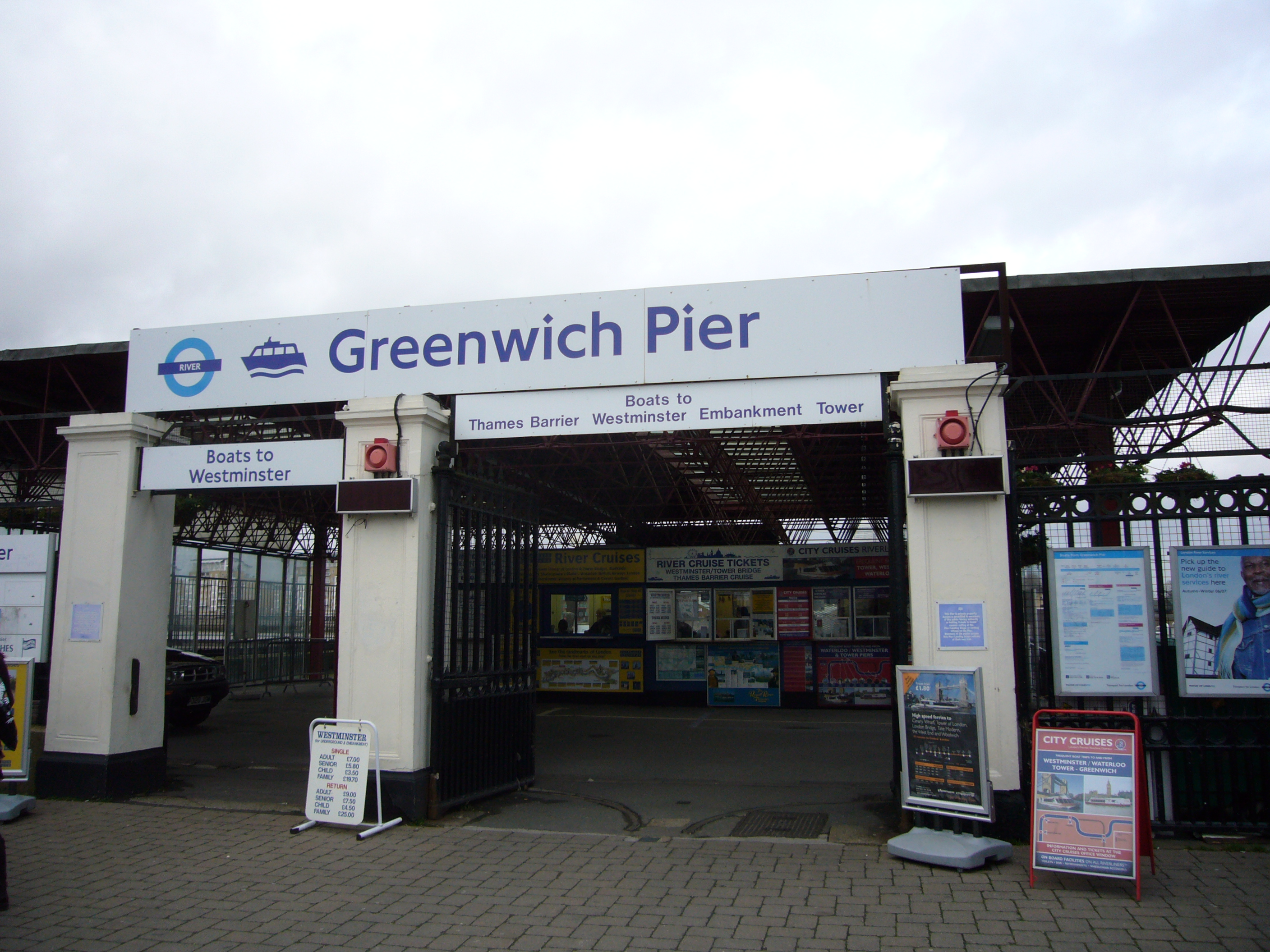
The entrance to the pier

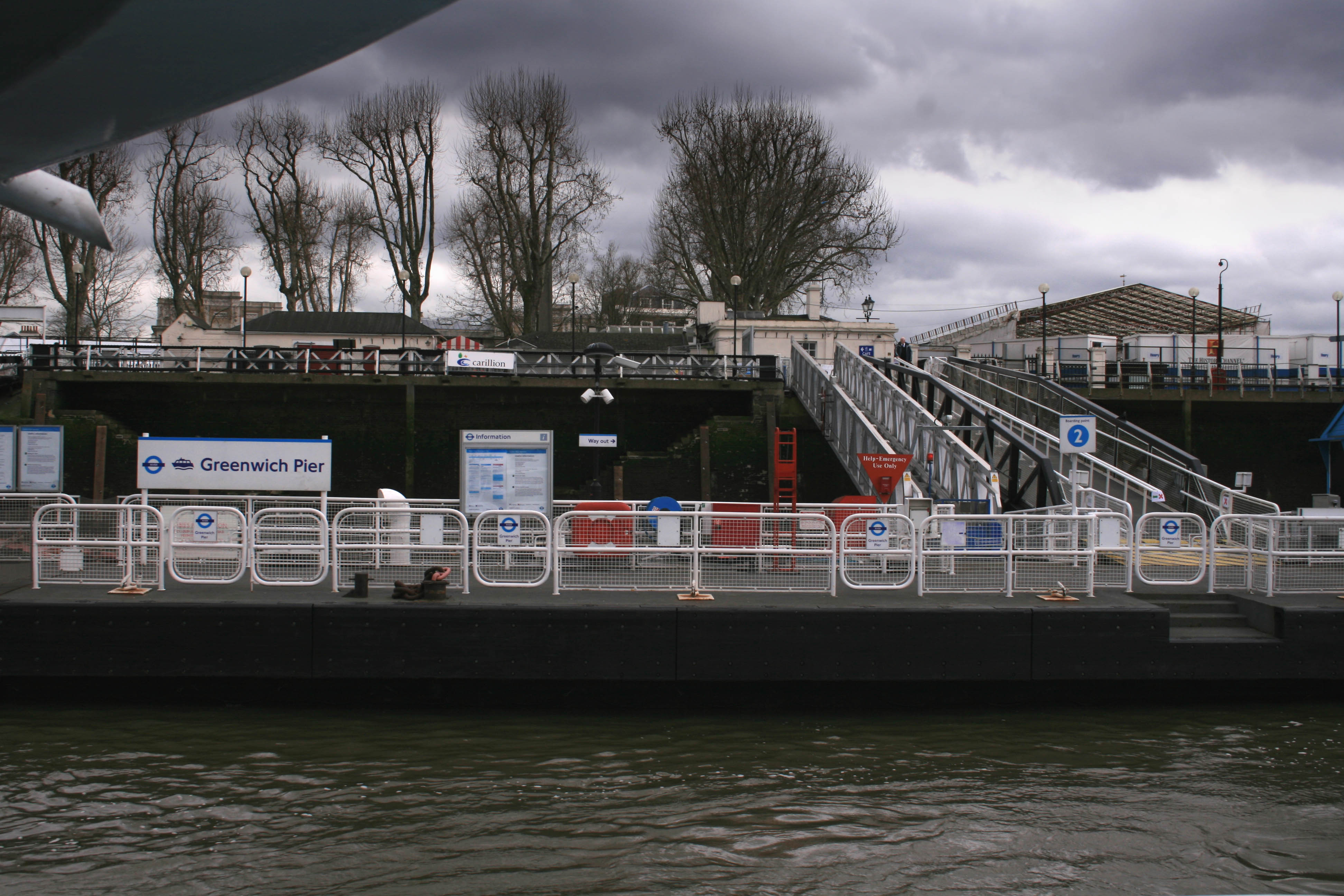
The pier on the Thames

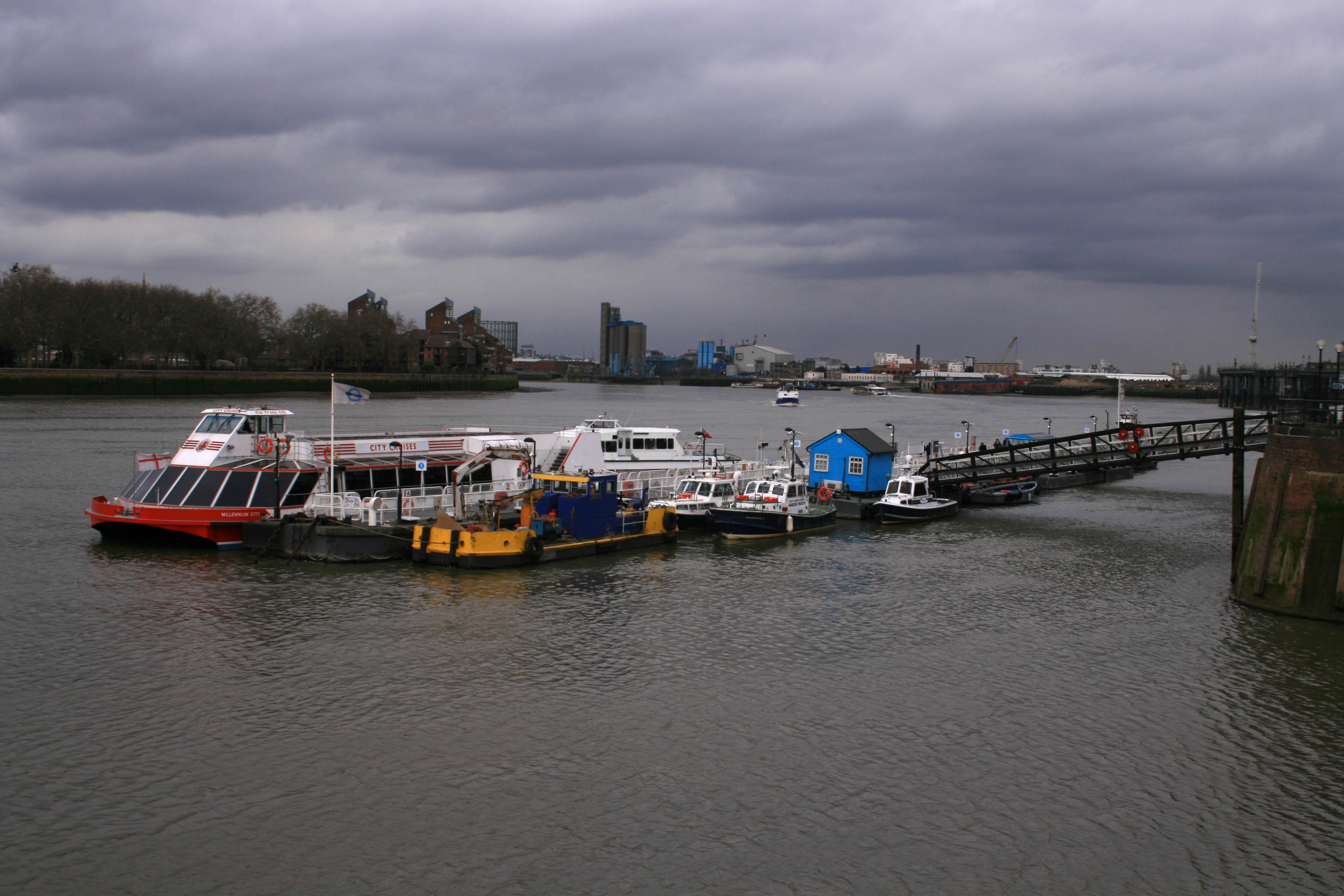
The pier on the Thames

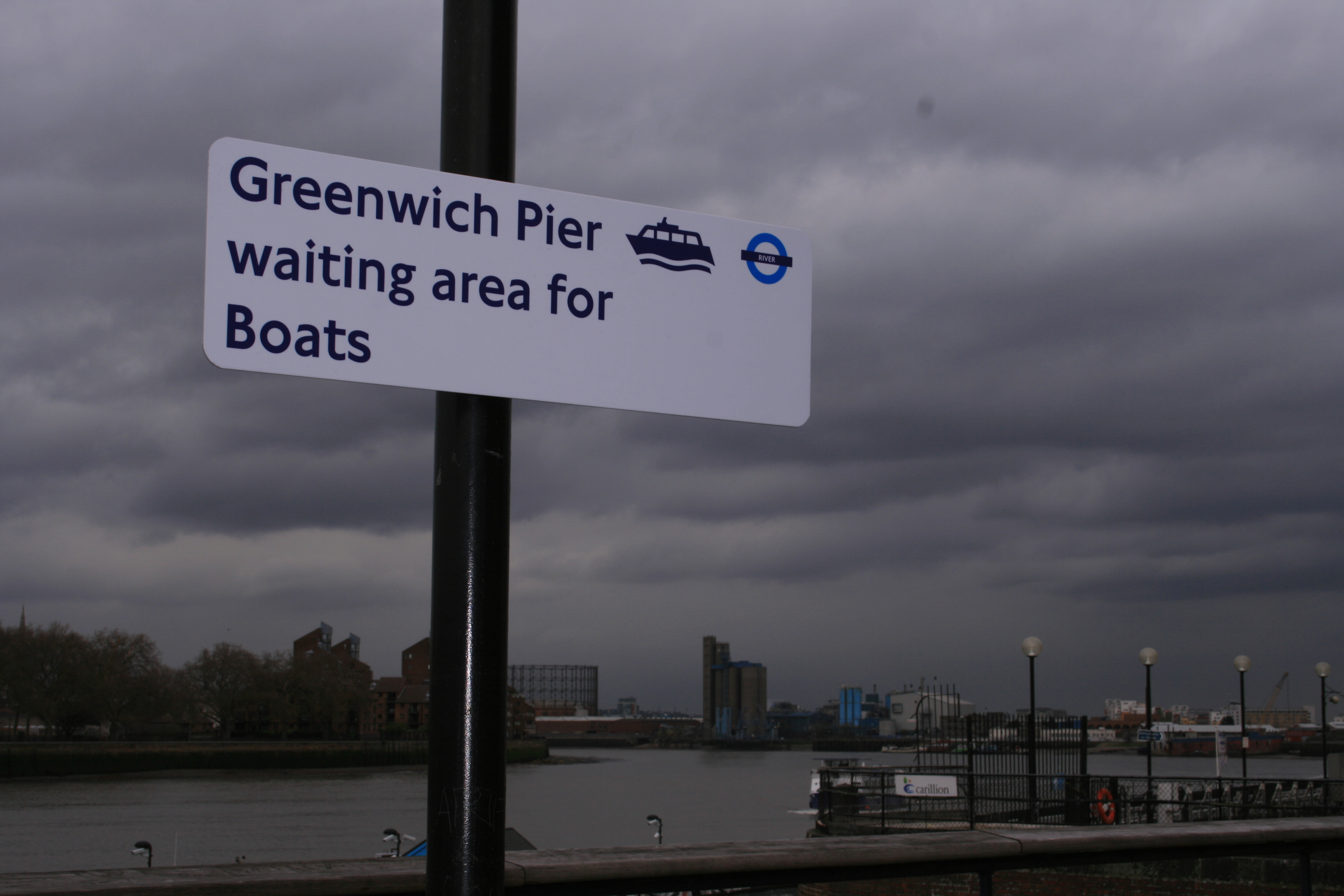
Sign

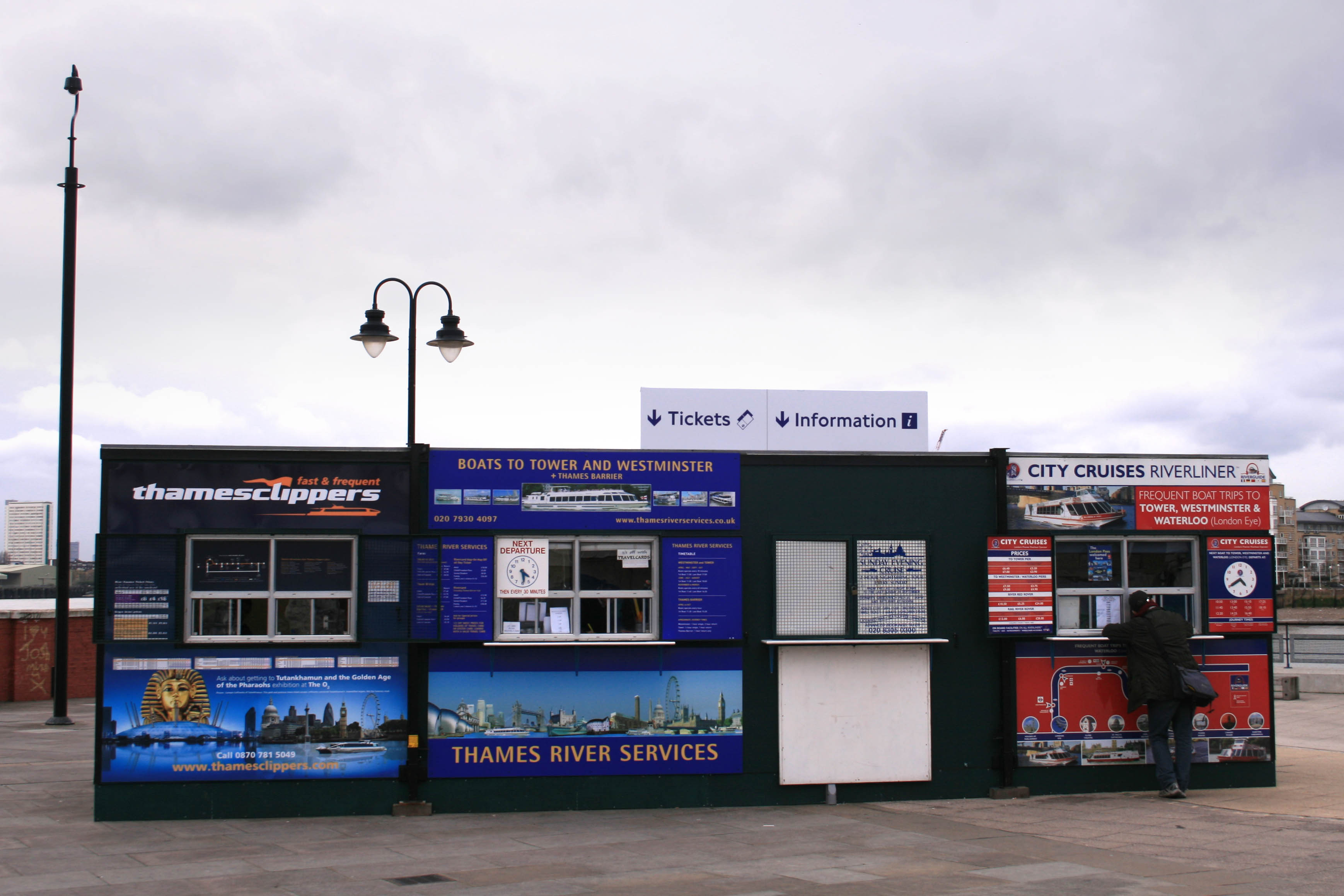
Ticket kiosks

Preceding station	London River Services	Following station
Masthouse Terrace Pier towards Battersea Power Station Pier	RB1	North Greenwich Pier towards Barking Riverside Pier
Masthouse Terrace Pier towards Putney Pier	RB6	North Greenwich Pier towards Barking Riverside Pier
Tower Millennium Pier towards Westminster Millennium Pier	Westminster to Greenwich Express Service	Terminus
