= Waterloo Pier =

Waterloo Pier may refer to:

- Waterloo Millennium Pier, the passenger boat service pier on the River Thames, London, UK
- Tower Lifeboat Station, formerly the Waterloo Police Pier, the base of the Royal National Lifeboat Institution's lifeboat service on the River Thames, London, UK
