= BSC Marine Group =

- Founded: 1994; 32 years ago
- Headquarters: Toowong, Queensland, Australia
- Services: Ship builder
- Owner: Michael Hollis
- Website: www.bscship.com.au

The BSC Marine Group is a shipbuilding company based in Brisbane, Queensland, Australia. Founded in 1994, it specialises in the design and construction of aluminium and composite vessels. Headquartered in Toowong in Queensland, Australia, its shipyard is at Hemmant.

== Overview ==
Its first vessel was the Incat Crowther designed by MSY Aussie Legend for Matilda Cruises, Sydney in 1995. Other vessels built have included eight CityCat ferries for the Brisbane City Council between 1996 and 1998 and six fast catamarans for the Thames Clippers service on the River Thames in London, England.
