= Town Pier, Gravesend =

Pier on the River Thames in Gravesend, Kent, England

Gravesend Town Pier
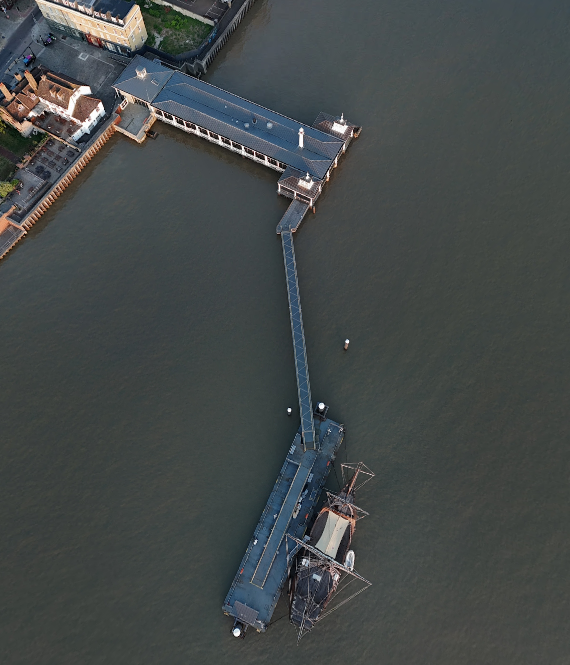
- Aerial of Gravesend Town Pier on the River Thames
- Type: Boat passenger pier
- Carries: Pedestrians
- Spans: River Thames
- Coordinates: 51.4454°N 0.3697°E
- Official name: Gravesend Town Pier
- Owner: Uber Boat by Thames Clippers
- Maintained by: Gravesham Borough Council

Characteristics
- Total length: 39 metres (127 ft)
- Width: 12 metres (40 ft)

History
- Designer: William Tierney Clark

The Gravesend Town Pier is located in Gravesend, Kent. It was designed by William Tierney Clark and built in 1834 on the site of the earlier Town Quay. Over 3 million passengers were served between 1835 and 1842, but around 1900, this pier fell into disuse due to the arrival of the railways.

In 2000, this site was restored by the Gravesham Borough Council, partly funded by the organisations English Heritage, English Partnerships, Heritage Lottery Fund, Kent County Council, and Manifold Trust. In 2002, this renovation project was finished. They had also added a restaurant and a bar to the pier. When reopened, the Gravesend Town Pier was initially successful, but it later became a fiscal failure.

Gravesend town pier is the oldest surviving cast iron pier in the world and is a Grade II* listed building.

== Current services ==
From 2012 to 2024 the Gravesend–Tilbury Ferry ran from the Town Pier. It is no longer in service.

On 4 November 2022, Uber Boat by Thames Clippers announced that they had completed the purchase of the Pier, with an aim to operate a long-term River Bus service from Gravesend within 2-3 years. In recent years they have operated select sailings into Central London during the summer season.

== Mention of the pier in other media ==
It is the setting of the 2017 song "Gravesend Pier" by Gone Molly, which describes a scene of poverty and wealth in nineteenth century England.

== See also ==
- List of piers
