= Wight Shipyard =

Coordinates: 50.7600°N 1.2889°W

- Industry: Ship building
- Headquarters: East Cowes, Isle of Wight, England
- Products: Ferries
- Website: www.wightshipyard.com

The Wight Shipyard is a shipbuilding company and shipyard based in East Cowes on the Isle of Wight, with their facilities occupying and including the historic Saunders-Roe flying boat hangar and British Hovercraft Corporation hangar. The company was originally known as Shemara Refit LLP, and was formed to undertake the refit of the classic yacht MY Shemara. They now specialise in the construction and refit of high speed craft and aluminium ships.

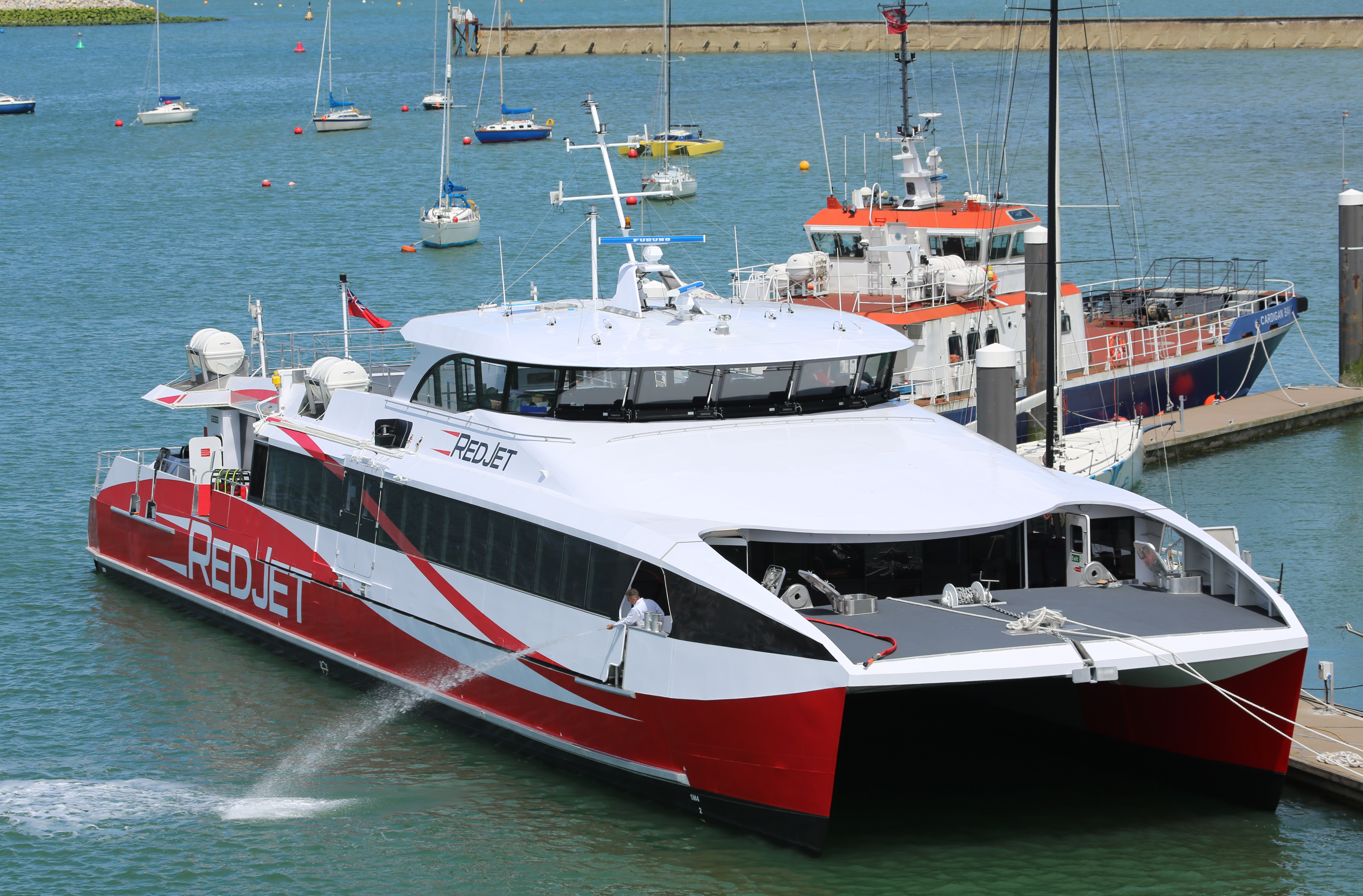
Red Jet 6 at 'ast Cowes in June 2016

== Ships built ==
Yard No.	Year	Type	Name	Tonnage	IMO Number	owner	Flag	Notes
1	2016	41.73 m high speed passenger ferry	Red Jet 6	363 GT	9788083	Red Funnel	British	
2	2017	35.37 m high speed passenger ferry	Jupiter Clipper	155 GT	N/A	Thames Clippers	British	
3	2017	35.37 m high speed passenger ferry	Mercury Clipper	155 GT	N/A	Thames Clippers	British	
4	2018	21 m cruise boats	Jacobite Maverick	N/A	N/A	Jacobite Loch Ness Ferries	British	Built by Aluminium Marine Consultants under subcontract at their shipyard in East Cowes
5	2018	41.73 m high speed passenger ferry	Red Jet 7	363 GT	9838321	Red Funnel	British	
6	2018	39 m high speed passenger ferry	Twin City Liner 3	N/A	N/A	Central Danube Region Marketing & Development GmbH’s Twin City Liner	Austria	Wight Shipyard first export order
7	2019	38.2 m high speed passenger ferry	Venus Clipper	172 GT	N/A	Thames Clippers	British	
8	2019	37 m passenger ferry	Lady A	295 GT	9886146	Ultramar ferries	Mexico	
9	2019	37 m passenger ferry	Lady D	295 GT	N/A	Ultramar ferries	Mexico	
10	2019	9 m Hybrid Patrol Vessel	Chasewell 9m	N/A	N/A	Chartwell Marine	British	
11	2020	34.14 m passenger ferry	I See One	222 GT	9881976	Captain Morgan Holdings Ltd	Malta	
12	2020	34.14 m passenger ferry	I See Two	222 GT	N/A	Captain Morgan Holdings Ltd	Malta	
13	2020	20 m passenger ferry	I See Three	125 GT	9881952	Captain Morgan Holdings Ltd	Malta	
14	2020	20 m passenger ferry	I See Four	125 GT	9881964	Captain Morgan Holdings Ltd	Malta	
15	2021	22 m Hybrid CTV	CWind Pioneer	N/A	N/A	Cwind	British	World’s first hybrid powered surface effect ship
16	2022	27.3 m explorer yachts Arksen 85	N/A	N/A	N/A	Arksen yachts	N/A	
17	2022	27.3 m explorer yachts Arksen 85	N/A	N/A	N/A	Arksen yachts	N/A	
18	2022	38.22 m Hybrid high speed passenger ferry	Earth Clipper	N/A	N/A	Thames Clippers	British	first hybrid high speed passenger ferry to be built in the UK
19	2023	38.22 m Hybrid high speed passenger ferry	Celestial Clipper London	N/A	N/A	Thames Clippers	British	second hybrid high speed passenger ferry to be built in the UK
20	2023	27.3 m explorer yachts Arksen 85	N/A	N/A	N/A	Arksen yachts	N/A	
21	2024	38.22 m Hybrid high speed passenger ferry	Mars Clipper London	N/A	N/A	Thames Clippers	British	

== Ships refitted ==
- Thames Clippers ferries
  - Sky Clipper
  - Star Clipper
  - Storm Clipper
- Red Funnel ferries
  - Red Eagle (In conjunction with Southampton Marine Services)
