= Woolwich (Royal Arsenal) Pier =

Pier on the River Thames

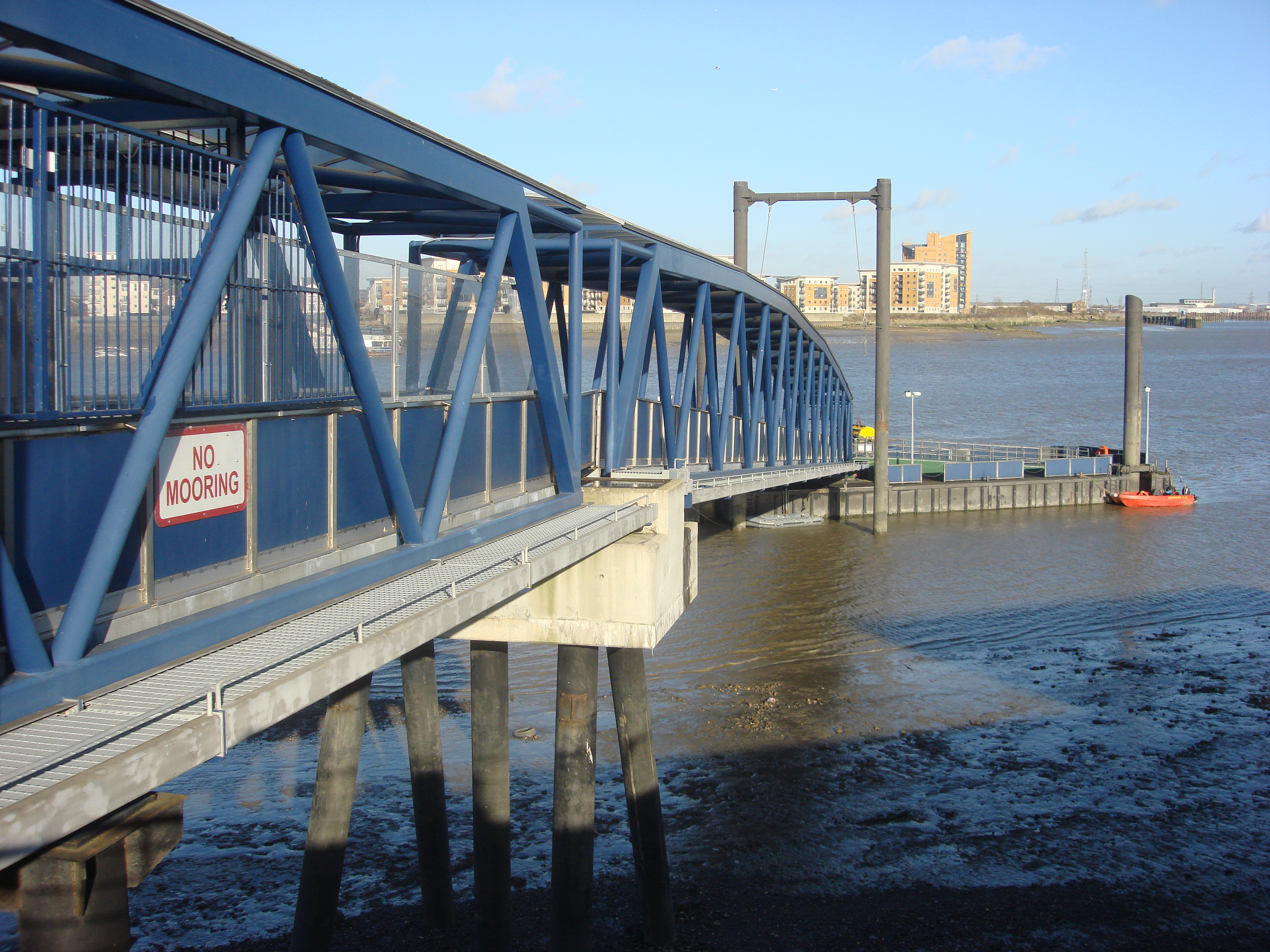
- Type: River bus and tourist/leisure services
- Location: River Thames, London
- Coordinates: 51.495858°N 0.070982°E
- Owner: London River Services
- Operator: Uber Boat by Thames Clippers

Characteristics
- Construction: Mowlem

History
- Opening date: 2002
- Location within Royal Borough of Greenwich

Woolwich (Royal Arsenal) Pier, also known as the Royal Arsenal Pier, Woolwich, is a pier on the River Thames, at Woolwich in the Royal Borough of Greenwich, England. Designed by Beckett Rankine and built by Mowlem in 2002, the pier is operated by Uber Boat by Thames Clippers.

== Service ==
Woolwich (Royal Arsenal) Pier is served by Uber Boat by Thames Clippers' RB1 service.

It is adjacent to the Royal Arsenal residential development.

== Connections ==
- Woolwich station
- Woolwich Arsenal station
- River crossings to North Woolwich

Woolwich Ferry
Woolwich foot tunnel (located next to the pier)

== Nearby places ==
- Plumstead
- Thamesmead
- London City Airport

== Lines ==
Preceding station	London River Services	Following station
Royal Wharf Pier towards Battersea Power Station Pier	RB1	Barking Riverside Pier Terminus
Royal Wharf Pier towards Putney Pier	RB6	Barking Riverside Pier Terminus
