= Blackfriars Pier =

Pier on the River Thames

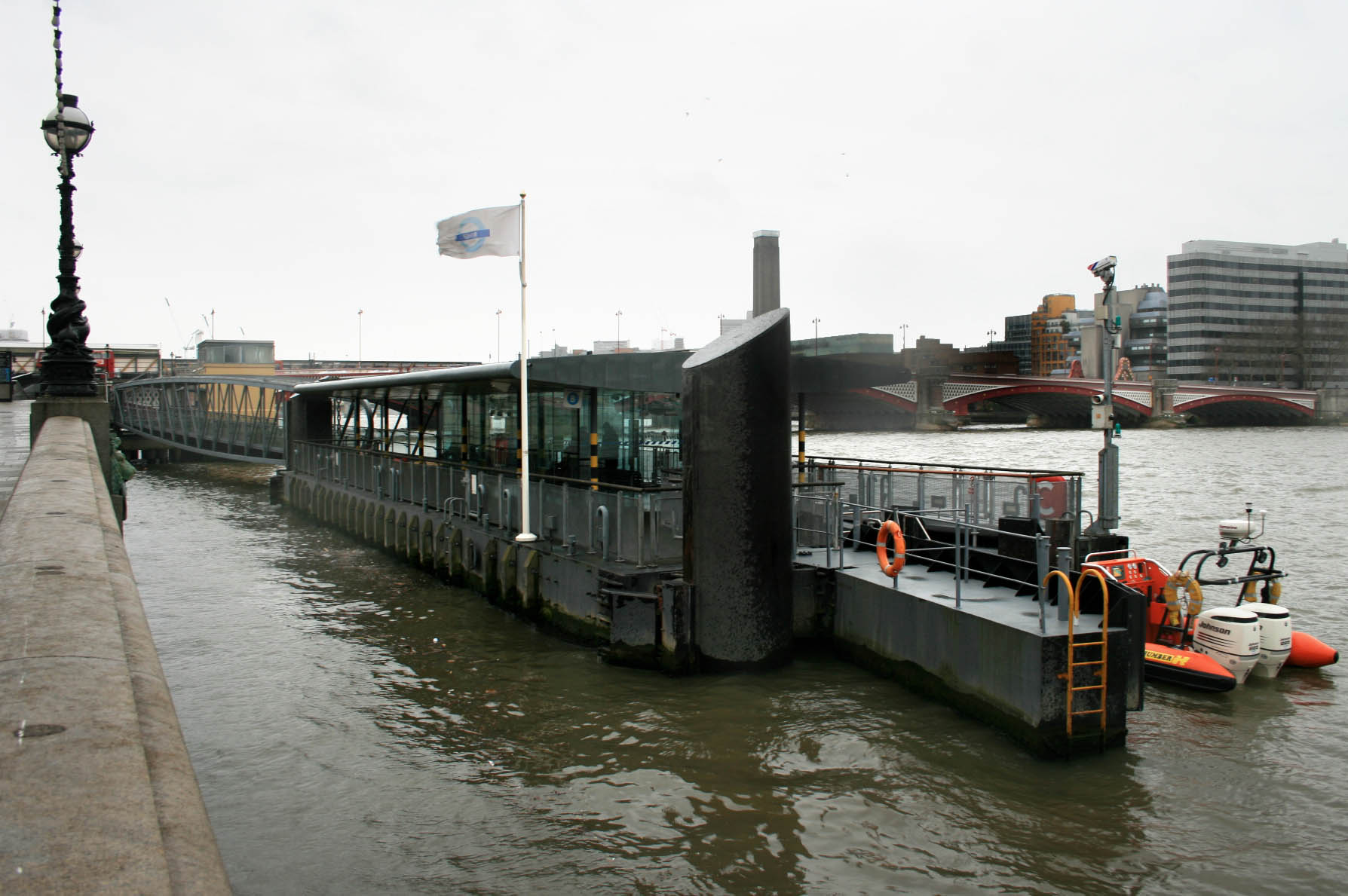
- The pier on the Thames with Blackfriars Bridge
- Type: River bus services
- Location: River Thames, London, UK
- Coordinates: 51.5107°N 0.1017°W
- Owner: London River Services
- Operator: Uber Boat by Thames Clippers

History
- Location within City of London

Blackfriars Pier is a pier on the River Thames, in the Blackfriars area of the City of London, United Kingdom. It is served by boats operated by Uber Boat by Thames Clippers under licence from London River Services and is situated on the north bank of the Thames, adjacent to Blackfriars Bridge.

Blackfriars Millennium Pier is a major transport interchange being close to Blackfriars rail and tube station, providing direct interchange with Thameslink and Southeastern rail services, and with the London Underground Circle and District lines. The Pier is seen predominantly as a commuter pier and thus is not typically served by River Bus services during weekend and bank holiday periods.

== History ==
The original Blackfriars Millennium Pier was made in 2000. It was funded by the City of London Corporation and London Transport.

In order to allow for works on the Thames Tideway Tunnel, the pier was moved to a new location 250 m (820 ft) downstream and opened in October 2016.

== Services ==
The pier is served by river bus service route RB6 between Putney and Canary Wharf (extends to Royal Wharf during off peak times) and route RB1 between Battersea Power Station and Barking Riverside during peak hours only operated by Uber Boat by Thames Clippers. Thames Tigers operate daily scheduled services and private charter trips from the pier.

== Connections ==
- Blackfriars station

== Gallery ==
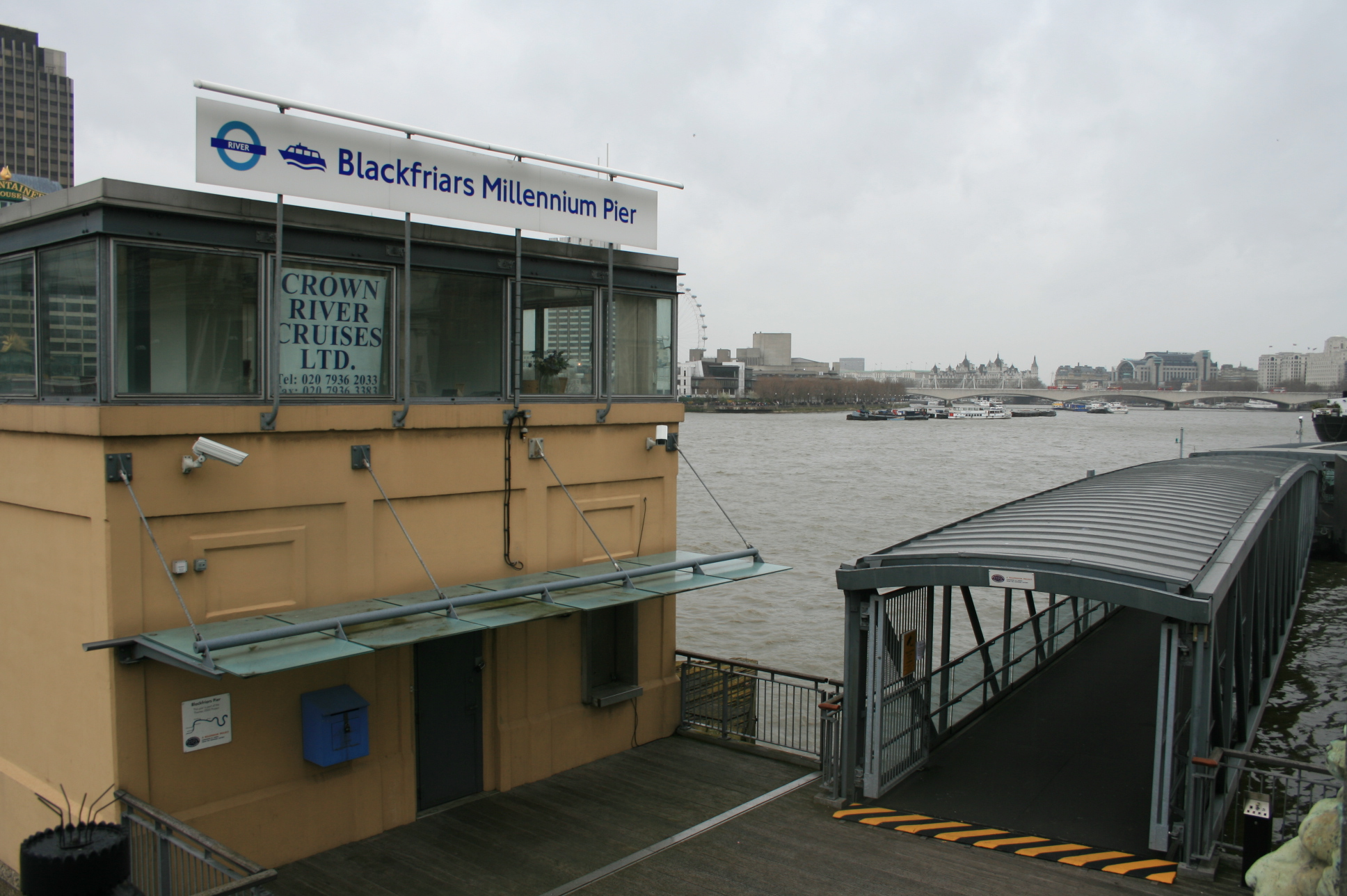
Entrance to the old (demolished) pier

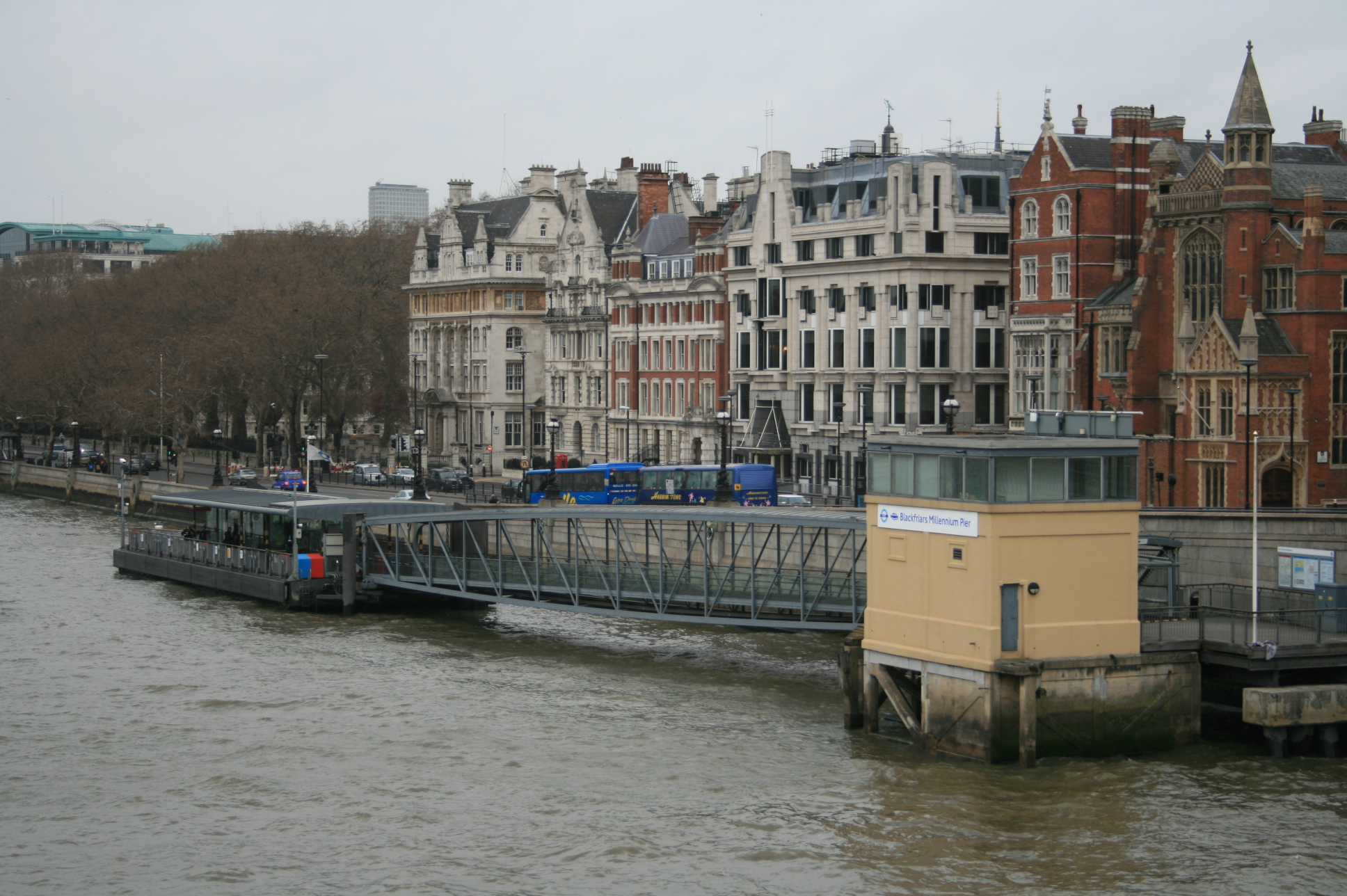
View from Blackfriars Bridge of the old pier

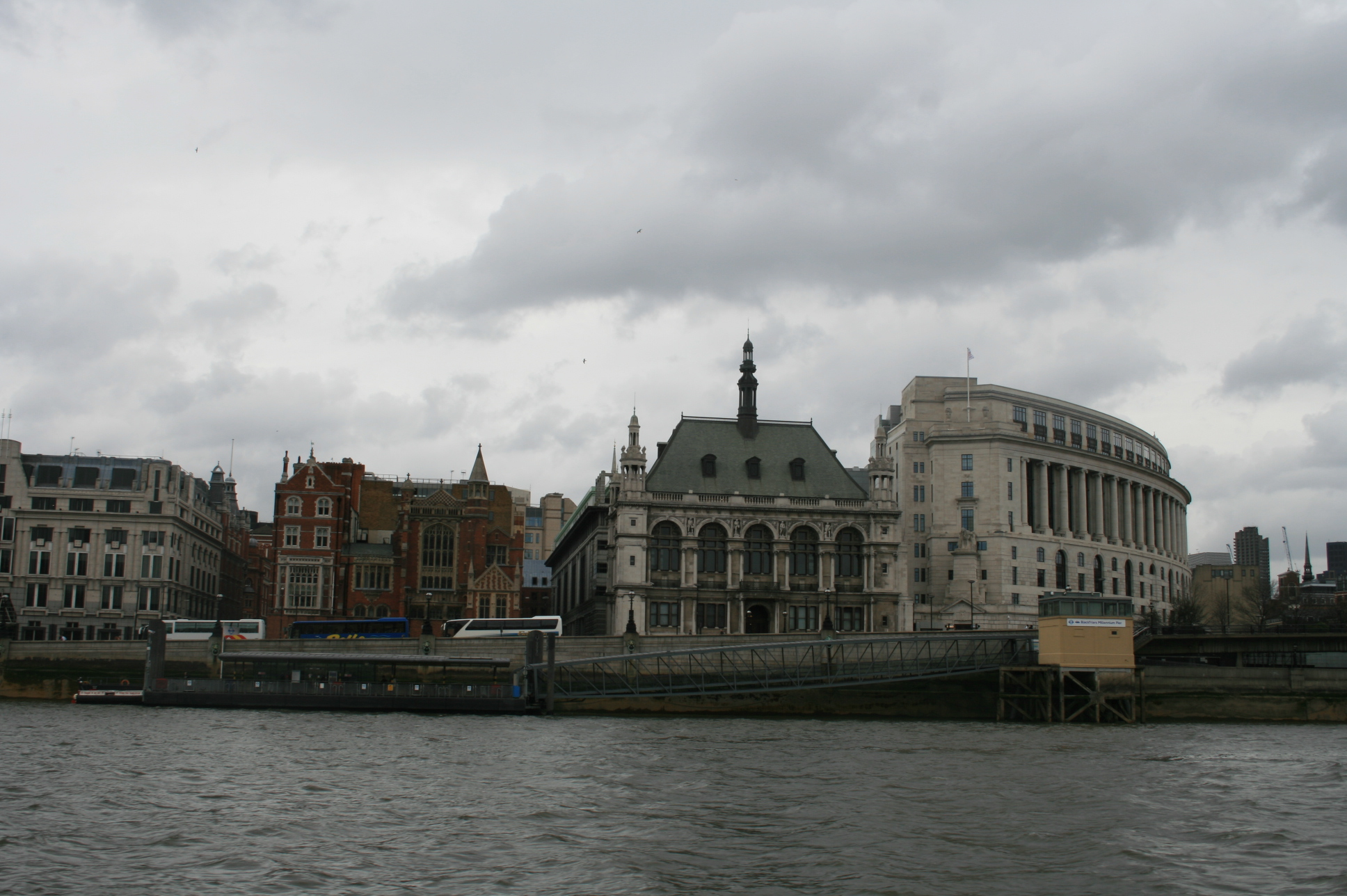
The old (demolished) pier with Unilever House in the background

== Lines ==
Preceding station	London River Services	Following station
Embankment Pier towards Battersea Power Station Pier	RB1	Bankside Pier towards Barking Riverside Pier
Embankment Pier towards Putney Pier	RB6	Bankside Pier towards Barking Riverside Pier
