= Cutty Sark for Maritime Greenwich DLR station =

Docklands Light Railway station

Cutty Sark
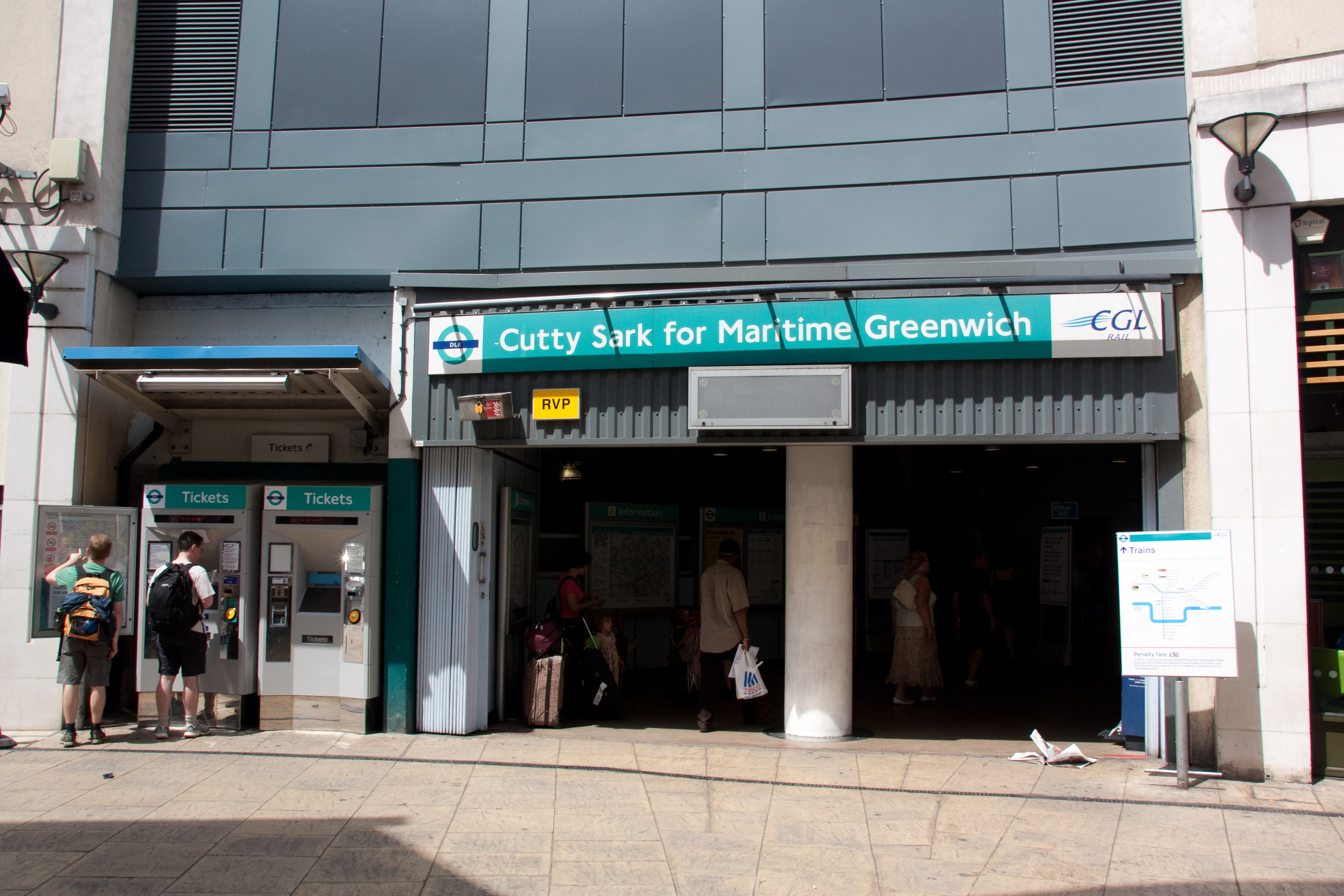
- Station entrance

General information
- Other names: Cutty Sark for Maritime Greenwich
- Location: Greenwich, Royal Borough of Greenwich
- Coordinates: 51.4815°N 0.0103°W
- Owner: Transport for London
- Manager: Docklands Light Railway
- Platforms: 2
- Connections: Greenwich Pier

Construction
- Structure type: Underground
- Accessible: Yes

Other information
- Fare zone: 2 and 3
- Website: Official website

History
- Opened: 3 December 1999

Passengers

DLR annual entry and exit
- 2021: ▲3.921 million
- 2022: ▲6.430 million
- 2023: ▲7.630 million
- 2024: ▼5.92 million
- 2025: No data
Location
- Location in Greenwich

Cutty Sark for Maritime Greenwich is a light metro station on the Docklands Light Railway (DLR) in Greenwich, south-east London. The station is named for its proximity to the Cutty Sark in the Maritime Greenwich district. It is the most central of the Greenwich DLR stations.

The station was designed, built and maintained by a private contractor from opening in 1999 to 2021, with the reliability of escalators at the station criticised by passengers. Between June 2025 and March 2026, the station was temporarily closed for all escalators in the station to be replaced.

== Location ==
The northernmost of the Greenwich DLR stations, Cutty Sark for Maritime Greenwich is located in the Maritime Greenwich district of south-eastern London. Its name comes from the clipper ship named Cutty Sark which is housed 200 metres (660 ft) to the north of the station. A number of well-known tourist attractions are in the surrounding area, including the National Maritime Museum, Royal Observatory, Greenwich Hospital, Greenwich foot tunnel, Trinity College of Music, and the Old Royal Naval College.

It is located close to the south bank of the River Thames and is 20 metres (66 ft) below ground. Along with all other stations on the Lewisham extension, it is in London fare zone 2 and 3, with passengers charged the lower of two possible fares.

== History ==
In the mid 1990s, Cutty Sark station was proposed as part of a 4.2-kilometre (3 mi) southern extension of the DLR to Lewisham. The station would serve the historic Greenwich town centre and nearby tourist attractions.

However, Cutty Sark was dropped from the project owing to its high construction costs (around £50 million) for the private consortium that would design, build, finance and maintain the extension. Following protests by Greenwich Council and promises of local funding, Cutty Sark was added back to the project in 1996 – with a mixed-use development to be built on top of the station by a developer working with English Partnerships. Construction started in October 1996, with a 60 metres (200 ft) long, three-storey deep station box built in Greenwich town centre to house the future station, with the cutter heads of the tunnel boring machines also extracted at the site.

Cutty Sark station opened on 3 December 1999 as part of the opening of the DLR extension to Lewisham. As with other stations on the extension, the station was designed by consultant W S Atkins. Since its opening, the extension has seen passenger growth as a result of it connecting, along with two National Rail connections, the Canary Wharf financial centre with Greenwich.

=== Escalator replacement ===
In the 2020s, the quality and reliability of the escalators at the station was criticised, with passengers noting that escalators had been broken for years. When escalators were unavailable, passengers had to use a 121-step staircase (or a small lift) to enter and leave the deep-level station. Between 1999 and 2021, the escalators were maintained by CGL Rail, the private contractor that built and maintained the Lewisham extension of the DLR. A local Labour councillor accused CGL Rail of handing the station back to TfL in a "shameful state".

In April 2024, TfL stated that they planned to repair and refurbish the escalators to improve their reliability at a cost of £695,000, however this did not resolve the issue. Local residents started a petition for full replacement of the escalators. In February 2025, TfL announced that all four escalators would be replaced at a cost of £4 million. In March 2025, TfL announced that the station would be temporarily closed for ten months from May 2025 for the works to take place. The station reopened on 23 March 2026. As well as replacing the escalators, the station had been refurbished – with a new lift, brighter wall panels in white and LED lighting.

== Station layout ==
Cutty Sark station has an island platform with a track each side of it. This is similar to its cross-river sister station, Island Gardens. The platforms are 20 metres (66 ft) below street level.

The need for increased capacity has posed issues for the station. While the majority of other DLR stations have had their platforms extended as part of Transport for London's three-carriage capacity enhancement project, the two-car-long island platform at Cutty Sark cannot be lengthened due to cost (estimated at £30 million) and risk of damage to the heritage site at street level. This is addressed by using selective door operation, allowing three-car trains to stop at the station by only having the doors near the centre of the train open in both end carriages; the first and last two sets of doors on each train do not open. Customers are warned of the need to move to the centre to leave the train by on-board announcements. A similar situation applies at Elverson Road.

== Services ==
The typical off-peak service in trains per hour from Cutty Sark for Maritime Greenwich in trains per hour (tph) is:

- 12 tph to Bank
- 12 tph to Lewisham

Additional services call at the station during the peak hours, increasing the service to up to 22 trains per hour in each direction, with up to eight trains per hour during the peak hours running to and from Stratford instead of Bank.

Preceding station	DLR	Following station
Island Gardens towards Bank or Stratford	Docklands Light Railway	Greenwich towards Lewisham

== Connections ==
Day and nighttime London Buses routes serve the station.

== Nearby places of interest ==
- Cutty Sark
- Fan Museum
- Greenwich Park
- National Maritime Museum
- Royal Observatory Greenwich
- Greenwich foot tunnel
- Greenwich Market
- Greenwich Hospital
- Old Royal Naval College
- St. Alfege's Church
- Trinity College of Music
- University of Greenwich
- Wernher Collection at Ranger's House
