= St George Wharf =

Residential development in Vauxhall, London

Coordinates: 51°29′8″N 0°7′34″W

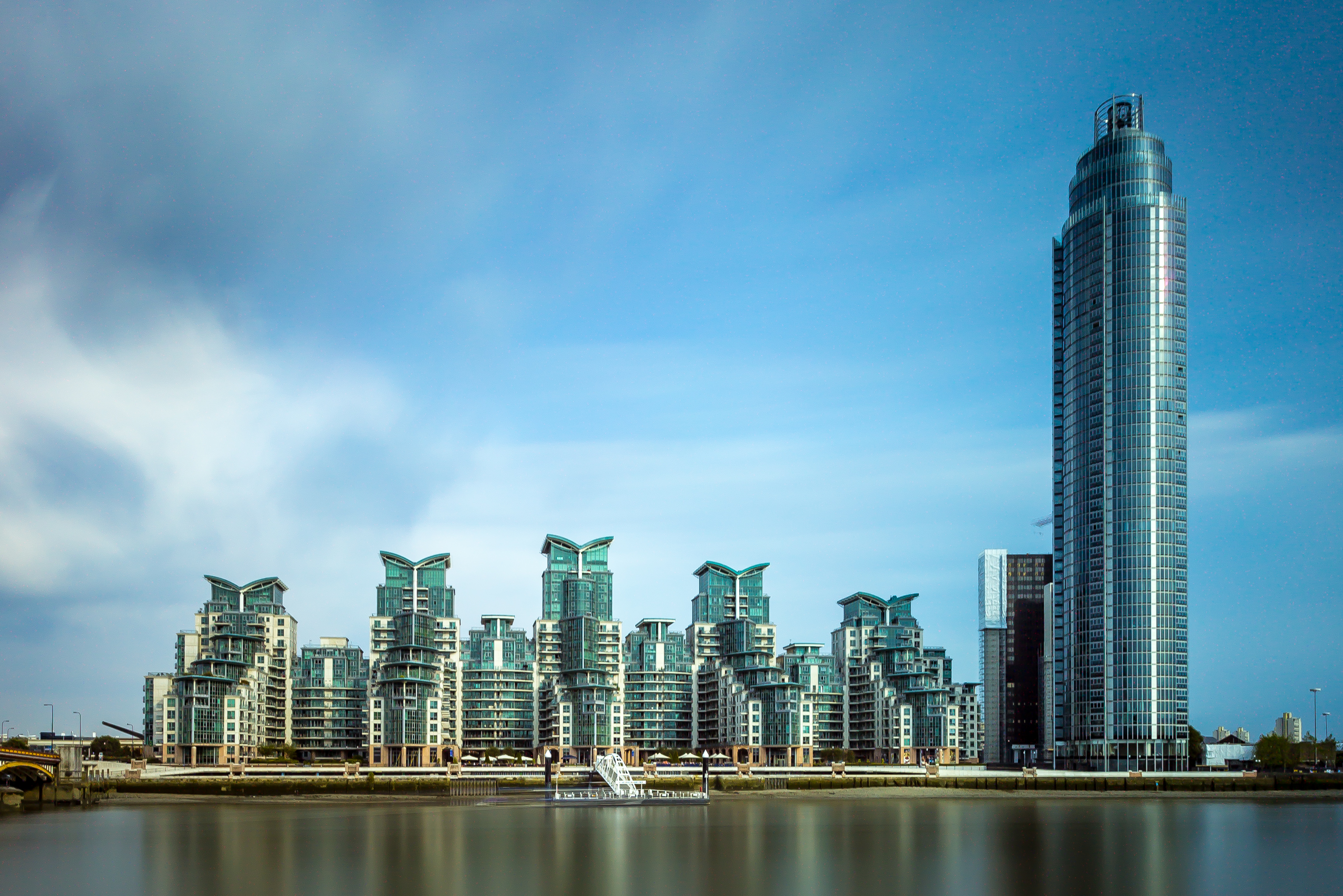
St. George Wharf residential complex of buildings

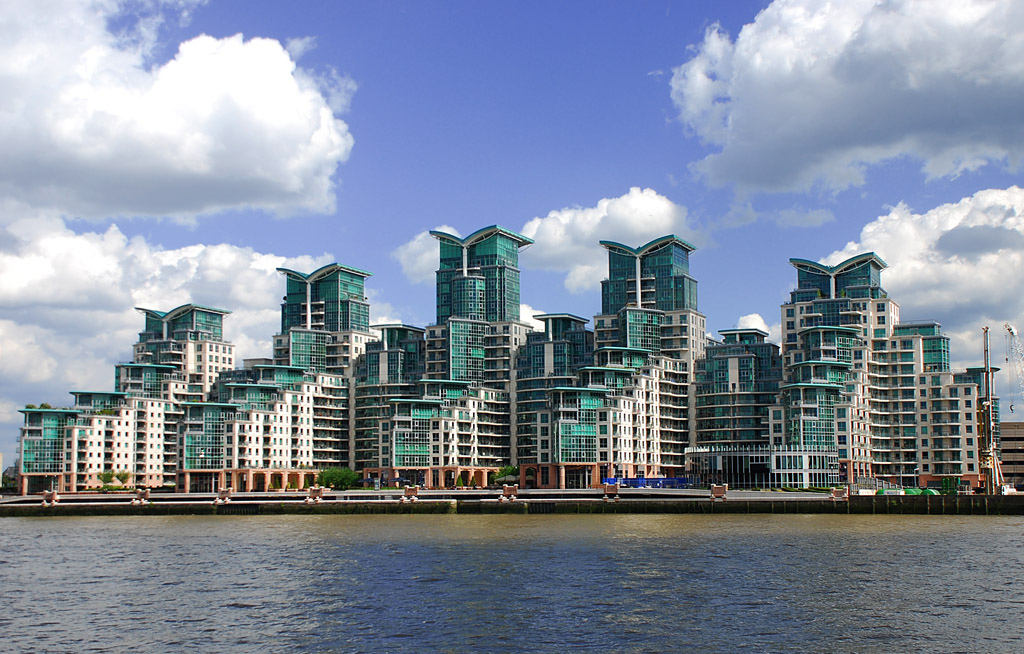
St George Wharf

St George Wharf is a riverside development in Vauxhall, Lambeth, London, England, located on the southern bank of the River Thames beside Vauxhall Bridge. Vauxhall (St George Wharf) Pier is a calling point for Uber Boat by Thames Clippers riverboats RB1 and RB6 services.

The 93,000-square-metre (1,000,000 ft^{2}) mixed-use development is located between the Vauxhall Cross road junction and the river, and is near Vauxhall station. The River Effra, one of the Thames' many underground tributaries, empties into the river close by. This development should not be confused with the smaller St George's Wharf which is in Shad Thames, London SE1, close to Tower Bridge.

== Construction ==
Construction of St George Wharf was carried out in phases by developers St George, part of Berkeley Group Holdings, with blocks opening between 2001 and 2010. St George Wharf Tower was the final block to be completed, opening in 2012. The development comprises over 1,400 apartments, as well as offices, retail units and restaurants. It was designed by the architecture practice Broadway Malyan.

St George Wharf comprises the following blocks:

1. Admiral House
2. Anchor House (21 St George Wharf, SW8 2FH)
3. Aquarius House
4. Armada House
5. Bridge House (18 St George Wharf, SW8 2LP/Q)
6. Drake House
7. Ensign House (12 St George Wharf, SW8 2LU)
8. Flagstaff House
9. Fountain House
10. Galleon House
11. Hamilton House
12. Hanover House (7 St George Wharf, SW8 2JA)
13. Hobart House
14. Jellicoe House
15. Kestrel House
16. Kingfisher House
17. Sentinel Point
18. The Tower

St George Wharf Tower is a residential skyscraper. It is 181 metres (594 ft) tall with 49 storeys. It is cited as the tallest residential building in the United Kingdom, however there are 10 apartments within The Shard, which is taller. By 2021, two fully residential towers in London had also exceeded St George Wharf Tower in height: Newfoundland Quay and Landmark Pinnacle.

== Helicopter crash ==
At 07:57 GMT on 16 January 2013, a helicopter collided with a crane being used in the construction of the St George Wharf Tower. The helicopter crashed in nearby Wandsworth Road, killing the pilot. One person on the ground also died, and a number of others were injured.

== Carbuncle Cup ==
In October 2006, St George Wharf was nominated and made the Building Design shortlist for the inaugural Carbuncle Cup, which was ultimately awarded to Drake Circus Shopping Centre in Plymouth.
