= Barking Riverside Pier =

Pier on the River Thames in London

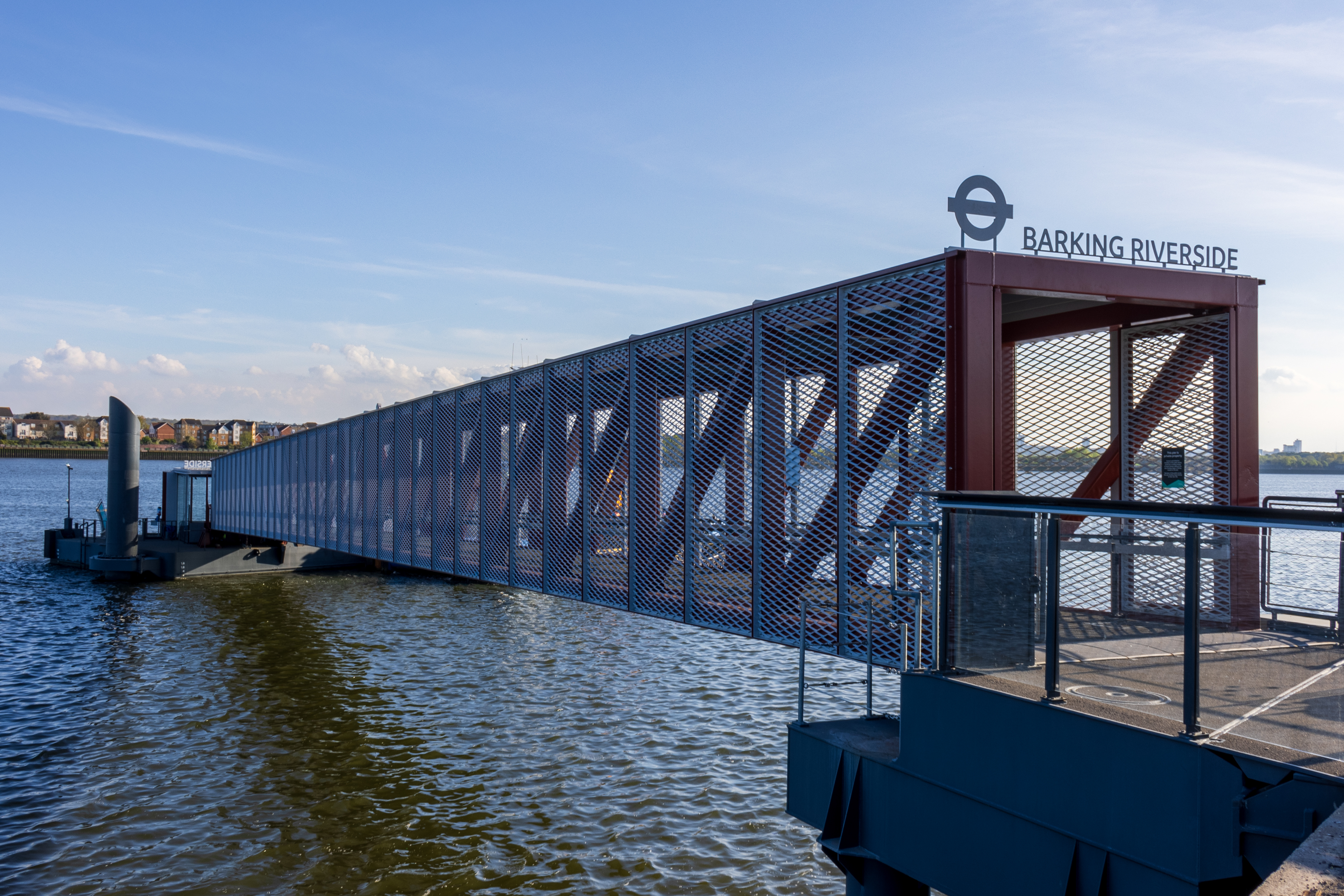
- The pier in April 2023
- Type: Passenger pier
- Carries: Passengers
- Spans: River Thames
- Location: Barking Riverside
- Coordinates: 51.5163°N 0.1173°E
- Owner: London River Services
- Operator: Uber Boat by Thames Clippers

Characteristics
- Construction: 1940; 86 years ago

History
- Designer: Anthony Carlile Architects/Beckett Rankine
- Opening date: 26 April 2022; 4 years ago
- Renovated: 2022; 4 years ago
- Location within Barking and Dagenham

Barking Riverside Pier movement
The sound of the gangway that connects the pier to the riverbank, moving with the tide. Recorded May 2022.

Barking Riverside Pier is an Uber Boat by Thames Clippers commuter service pier located on the River Thames at Barking Riverside. Passenger services began on 26 April 2022. The pier provides interchange with Barking Riverside railway station and local bus routes. The pier was brought into use following a renovation of the reinforced concrete coaling jetty previously used by Barking Power Station.

== History ==
The existing structure was built in 1940 in order to bring coal to Barking Power Station. Earlier jetty structures were found at the site as early as 1864 and a coaling jetty was constructed with the power station in 1925. Construction of the passenger pier began in 2021 and cost £7.3 million.

== Design ==
The 1940 T-shaped jetty consists of a deck and supports made from reinforced concrete. The canting brow and pontoon were added in order to provide passenger services from 2022. They were fabricated at the Ravestein shipyard in the Netherlands. The renovation work was designed by Anthony Carlile Architects and marine engineers Beckett Rankine.

== Location ==
The pier is located on the north bank of the River Thames at Barking Riverside. It is accessed from Project Road in the Barking Riverside neighbourhood of the London Borough of Barking and Dagenham. It provides interchange with Barking Riverside railway station on the London Overground’s Suffragette line and East London Transit branded local bus routes EL1 and EL3.

== Services ==
Passenger services began on 26 April 2022. It is served by route RB1 and is located in the East Zone.

The first westbound service towards central London is at 06:10 on weekdays and 07:53 at weekends. The last westbound service is 21:25 on weekdays and 21:05 at weekends.

Journey times are 9 minutes to Woolwich, 20 minutes to North Greenwich, 28 minutes to Greenwich, 40 minutes to Canary Wharf, 51 minutes to London Bridge City, 63 minutes to Blackfriars and 69 minutes to Embankment.

Preceding station	London River Services	Following station
Woolwich (Royal Arsenal) Pier towards Battersea Power Station Pier	RB1	Terminus
Woolwich (Royal Arsenal) Pier towards Putney Pier	RB6	Terminus
