= Battersea Power Station Pier =

Pier on the River Thames in London

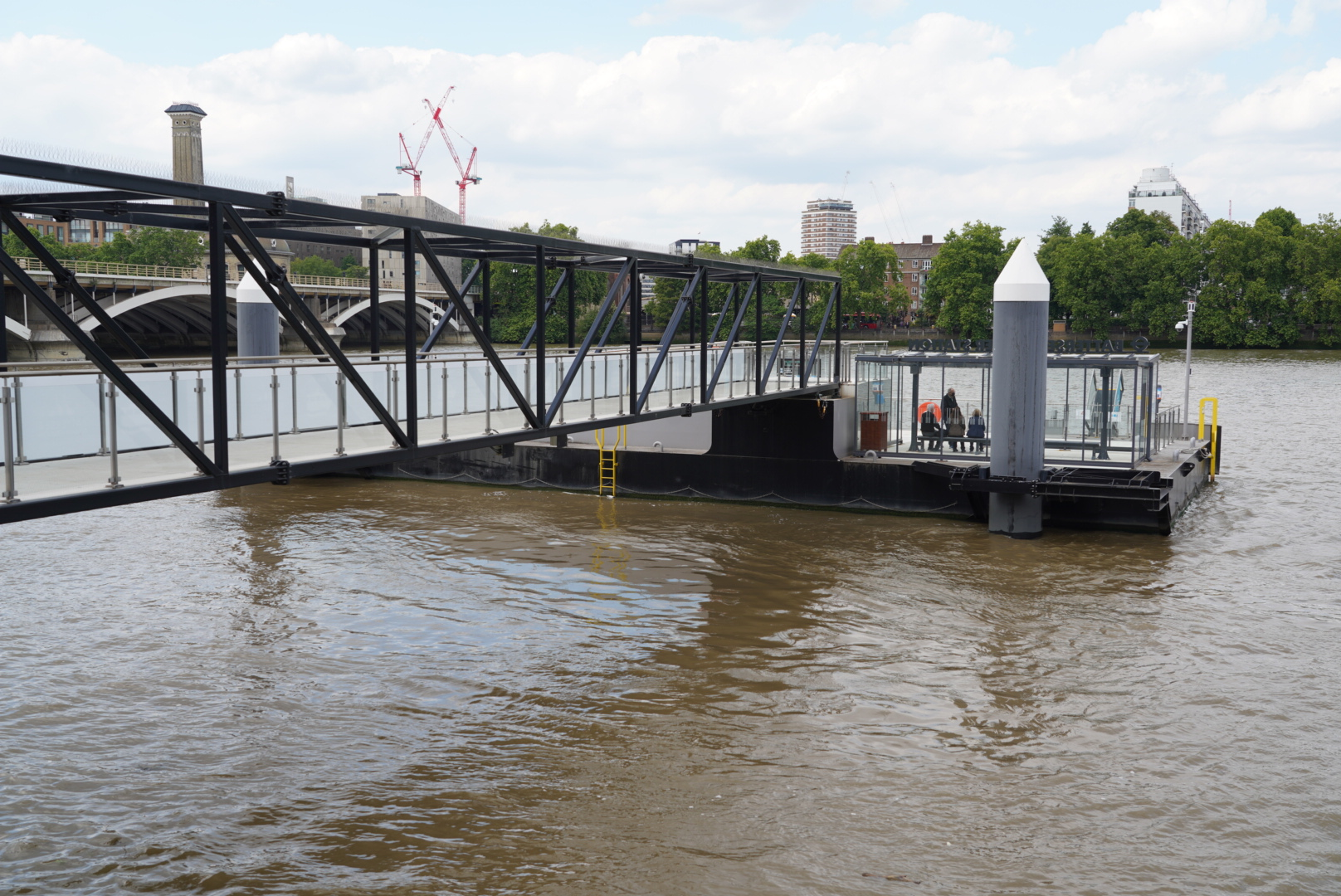
- Type: Passenger pier
- Carries: Passengers
- Spans: River Thames
- Location: Battersea Power Station
- Coordinates: 51.4837°N 0.1456°W
- Owner: London River Services
- Operator: Uber Boat by Thames Clippers

History
- Opening date: 2017
- Location within London Borough of Wandsworth

Battersea Power Station Pier is an Uber Boat by Thames Clippers commuter service pier, located on the River Thames at Battersea Power Station. The pier provides interchange with Battersea Power Station tube station.

== Location ==
The pier is located on the south bank of the River Thames at Battersea Power Station. It provides interchange with Battersea Power Station tube station on the London Underground.

== Services ==
It is served by routes RB1, RB2 and RB6. It is located in the Central Zone.

Preceding station	London River Services	Following station
Terminus	RB1	St George Wharf Pier towards Barking Riverside Pier
Cadogan Pier towards Putney Pier	RB6	St George Wharf Pier towards Barking Riverside Pier
