= West India Pier =

Disused pier on the River Thames

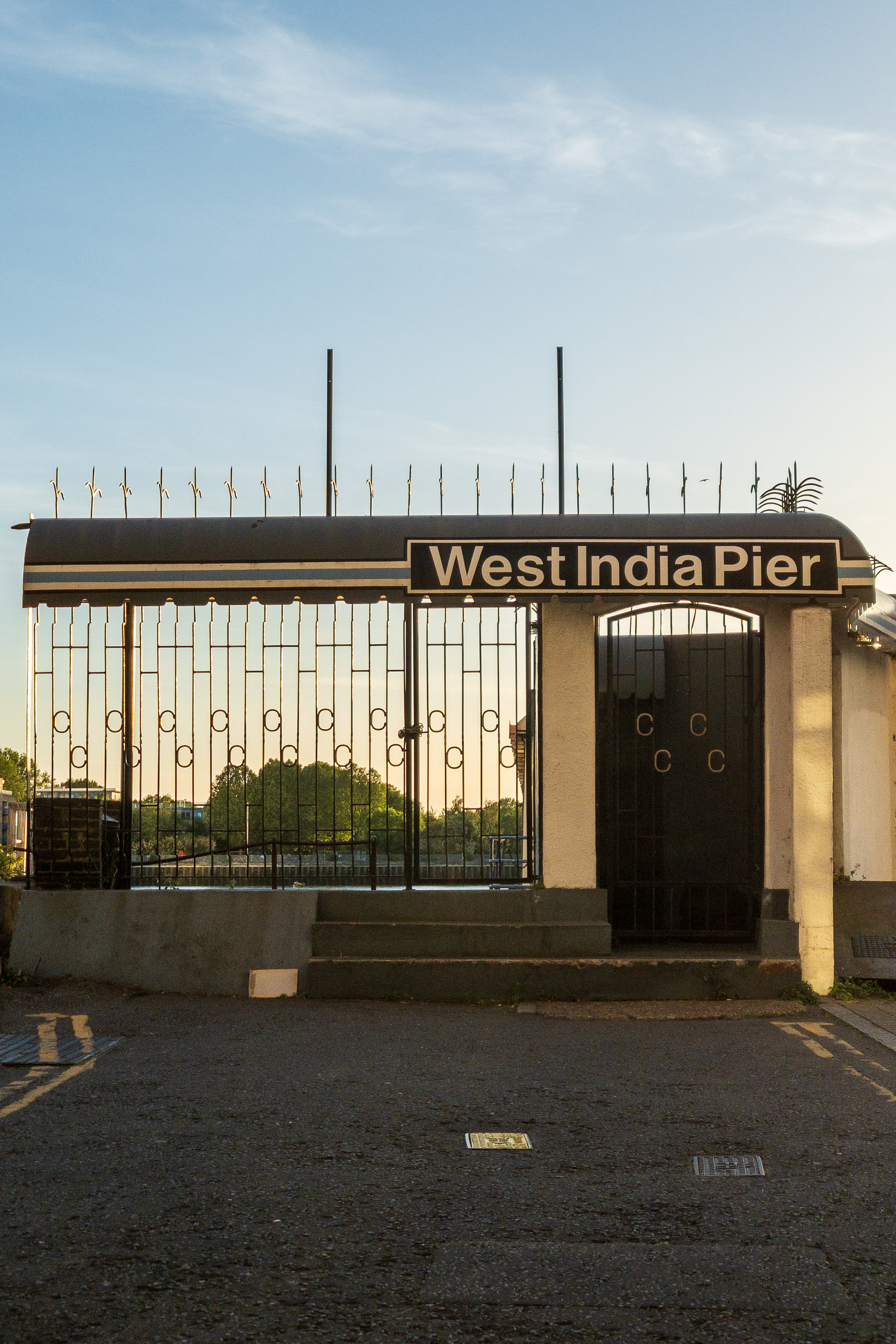
- West India Pier as seen from Cuba Street
- Type: Former working pier
- Spans: River Thames
- Location: Isle of Dogs
- Coordinates: 51°30′05″N 0°1′38″W
- Operator: London River Services

Characteristics
- Construction: 1874-75

History
- Opening date: 1874-75
- Closure date: 1993

West India Pier (formerly West India Dock Pier) is a pier on the River Thames in the Isle of Dogs area of London. It can be found beside the Anchorage Point and Millennium Harbour housing developments at the end of Cuba Street.

== Construction ==
It was built in 1874–75 to support the transfer of goods by the East and West India Dock Companies before its ownership was transferred to the Port of London Authority in 1909.

After becoming damaged by enemy fire in March 1941 (during the Second World War), it was rebuilt with the pontoon from the unused Blackwall Pier and reopened in 1949–50.

== Services ==
The pier has been disused since 1993 when the Docklands River Bus route it served from 1988 to 1991 failed to gain traction, owing to low passenger footfall. The route could cover Charing Cross to West India Pier in 20 minutes.

A 10-minute walk away, Canary Wharf Pier (which opened in July 1991) is the nearest active pier serving River Bus passengers.
