= Columbia Wharf, Rotherhithe =

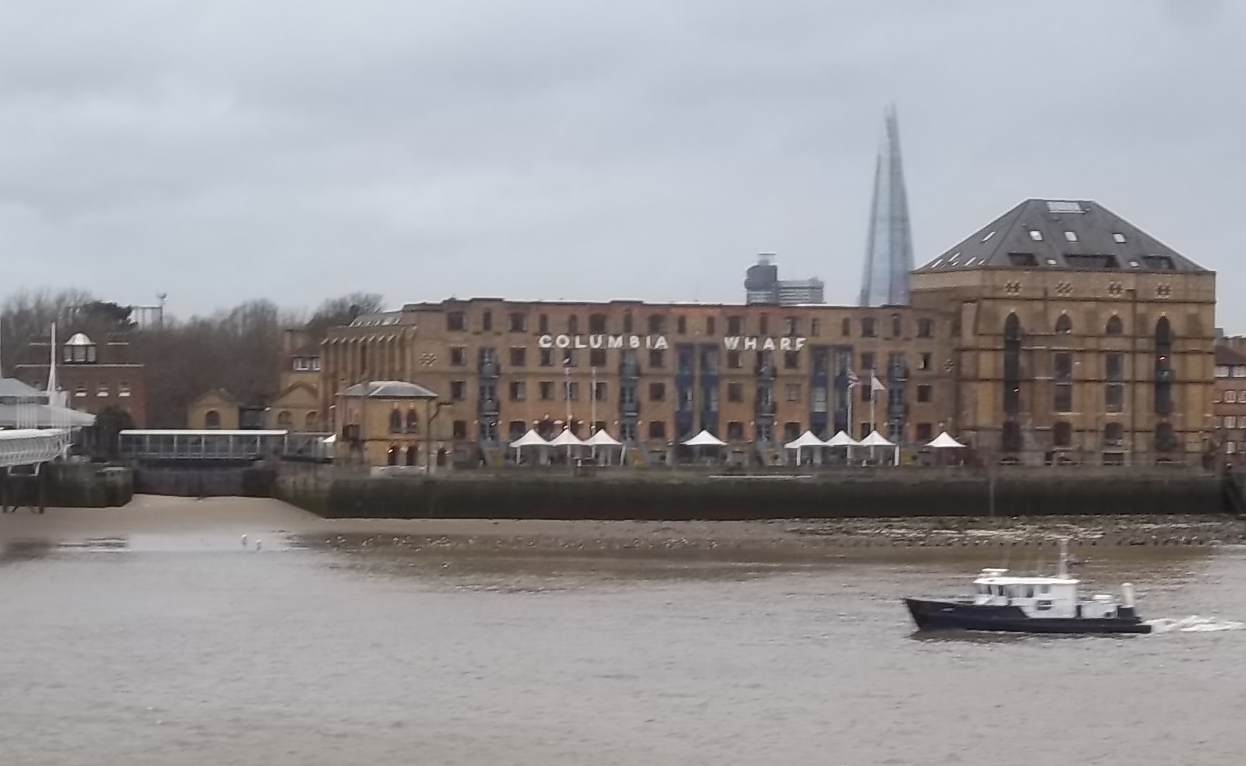

- Location within London Borough of Southwark

General information
- Type: converted grain silo
- Location: 265 Rotherhithe Street, London, United Kingdom
- Coordinates: 51.5050°N 0.0334°W
- Construction started: 1864
- Completed: 1991

Columbia Wharf, on the south bank of the River Thames in London, was the first grain silo in a British port. Built in 1864, it was designed by architect and hymnwriter James Edmeston for G & I L Green's Patent Ventilating Grain Company. It is in Rotherhithe, south of Cuckold's Point and north of Nelson Dock Pier. Canada Wharf was added to the complex in 1870–1. Used for storage of foodstuffs until 1976, the complex, including a former engine house and boiler to the south, was listed as a Grade II building in 1983, and is now used for accommodation.

== Use as storage ==
In 1914, the building was adapted for more general use, such as storage of tea, coffee, cocoa and dried fruits, and used as such until 1976.

== Conversion to accommodation ==
The façade remains, but it has since been turned into housing with part being incorporated into the DoubleTree by Hilton Hotel London – Docklands Riverside.
