= Canary Wharf – Rotherhithe Ferry =

Ferry service in London

Coordinates: 51.504642°N 0.031908°W

- London River Services
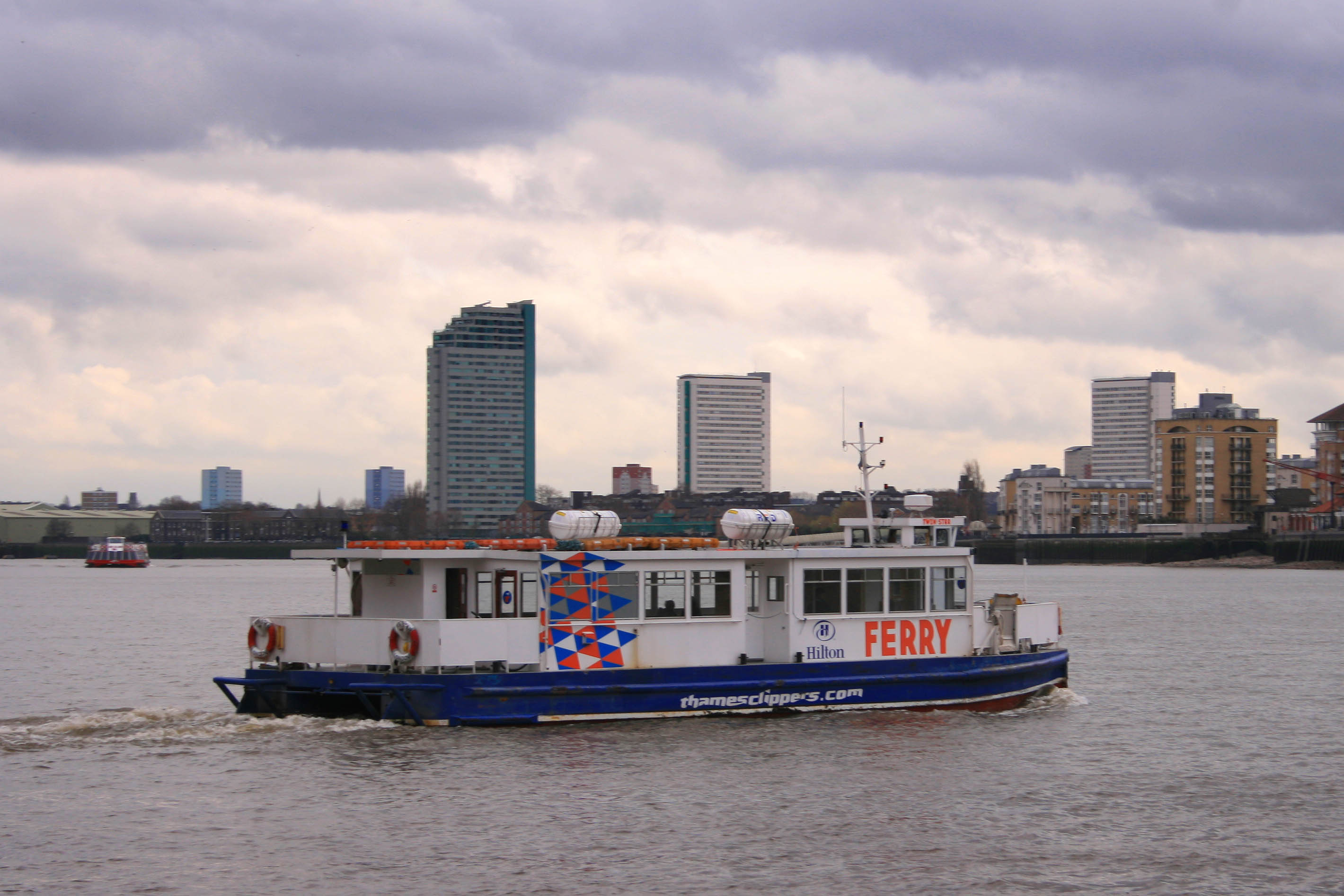
- The ferry crossing the Thames to Rotherhithe
- Locale: London, England
- Waterway: River Thames
- Transit type: Passenger ferry
- Owner: London River Services
- Operator: Uber Boat by Thames Clippers
- No. of terminals: 2

The Canary Wharf – Rotherhithe Ferry is a passenger ferry across the River Thames in the south east of London, England. The service connects Canary Wharf Pier, serving the major Canary Wharf office development north of the river, with Rotherhithe Pier at the DoubleTree Docklands Hotel in Rotherhithe.

Boats operate roughly every 10 minutes at peak time, or every 20 minutes off-peak time. There are service breaks between 11:03–12:05 and 20:13–21:05.

Boats can be used by guests of the hotel free of charge, as well as by passengers not staying at the hotel, for a fee.

The service is operated by Uber Boat by Thames Clippers, who also operate commuter boats along the river, but uses rather smaller boats.

In March 2020 the service was suspended due to the Covid-related closure of the DoubleTree by Hilton hotel in Rotherhithe. The service re-opened in September 2020.

In March 2025, the service was suspended once again to facilitate works as part of a project to launch an electric boat, christened Orbit Clipper, and become the first fully electric cross river ferry in London. While the project is underway, extra services are being run to Greenland (Surrey Quays) Pier, as an alternative to the ferry.

The new fully electric Orbit Clipper launched on 5 December 2025.

== See also ==
- Crossings of the River Thames
