= Rotherhithe =

Residential district in south-east London, England

Coordinates: 51.4989°N 0.0426°W

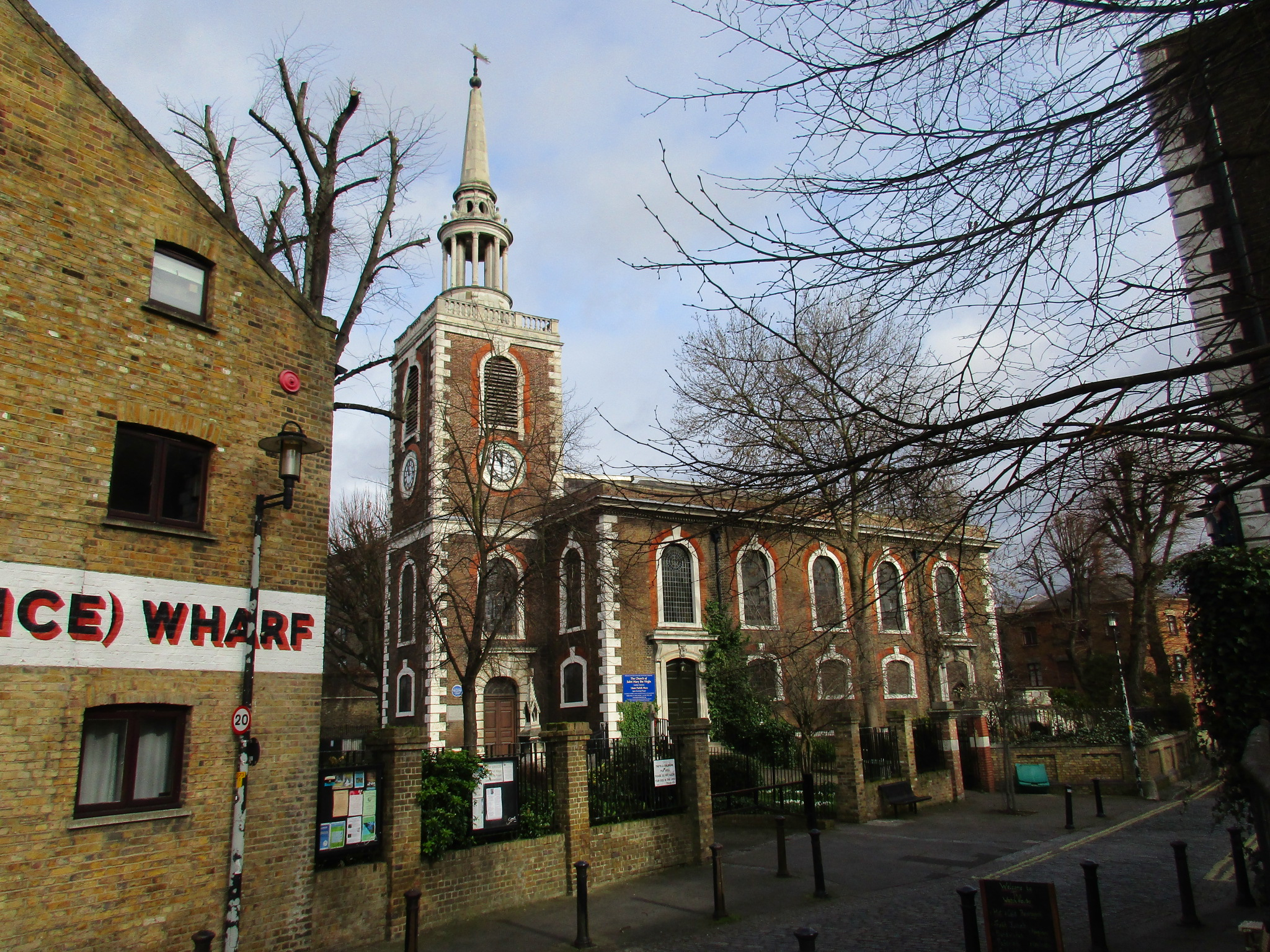
- St. Mary's Church, Rotherhithe

- Location within Greater London
- Population: 13,743 (2011 Census. Ward)
- OS grid reference: TQ358796
- London borough: Southwark
- Ceremonial county: Greater London
- Region: London
- Country: England
- Sovereign state: United Kingdom
- Post town: LONDON
- Postcode district: SE8, SE16
- Dialling code: 020
- Police: Metropolitan
- Fire: London
- Ambulance: London
- UK Parliament: Bermondsey and Old Southwark
- London Assembly: Lambeth and Southwark

Rotherhithe (/ˈrɒðərhaɪð/ RODH-ər-hydhe) is a district of South London, England, and part of the London Borough of Southwark. It is on the south bank of a bend in the Thames, facing Wapping, Shadwell and Limehouse on the north bank, with the Isle of Dogs to the east. It borders Bermondsey to the west and Deptford to the south-east. The district is a part of the Docklands area.

Rotherhithe has a long history as a port, with Elizabethan shipyards and working docks until the 1970s. In the 1980s, the area along the river was redeveloped as housing through a mix of warehouse conversions and new-build developments. The Jubilee line was extended to the area in 1999, giving fast connections to the West End and to Canary Wharf; the East London underground line was converted to part of the London Overground network in 2010, which provides easy access to the City of London. As a result, Rotherhithe is now a gentrifying residential and commuter area, with urban regeneration progressing around Deal Porter Square at Canada Water; a new town centre with restaurant and retail units, as well as new residential developments, is emerging here around the existing freshwater dock and transport hub.

Rotherhithe is 4.5 km (2.8 mi) east of London's centre point at Charing Cross.

== Etymology ==
The name "Rotherhithe" is thought to derive from the Anglo-Saxon Hrȳðer-hȳð, meaning "landing-place for cattle". The first recorded use of this name was in about 1105, as Rederheia. In the past Rotherhithe was also pronounced and written as Redriff(e).

== Description ==
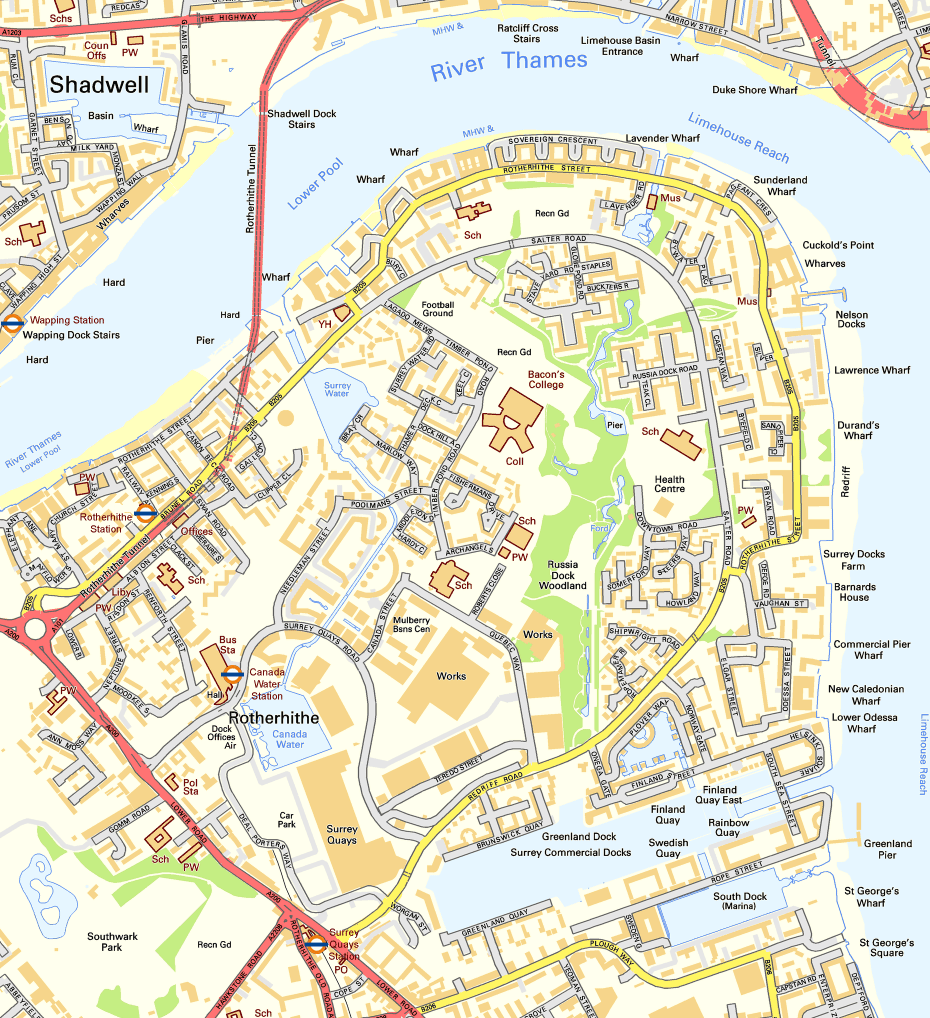
Map of Rotherhithe

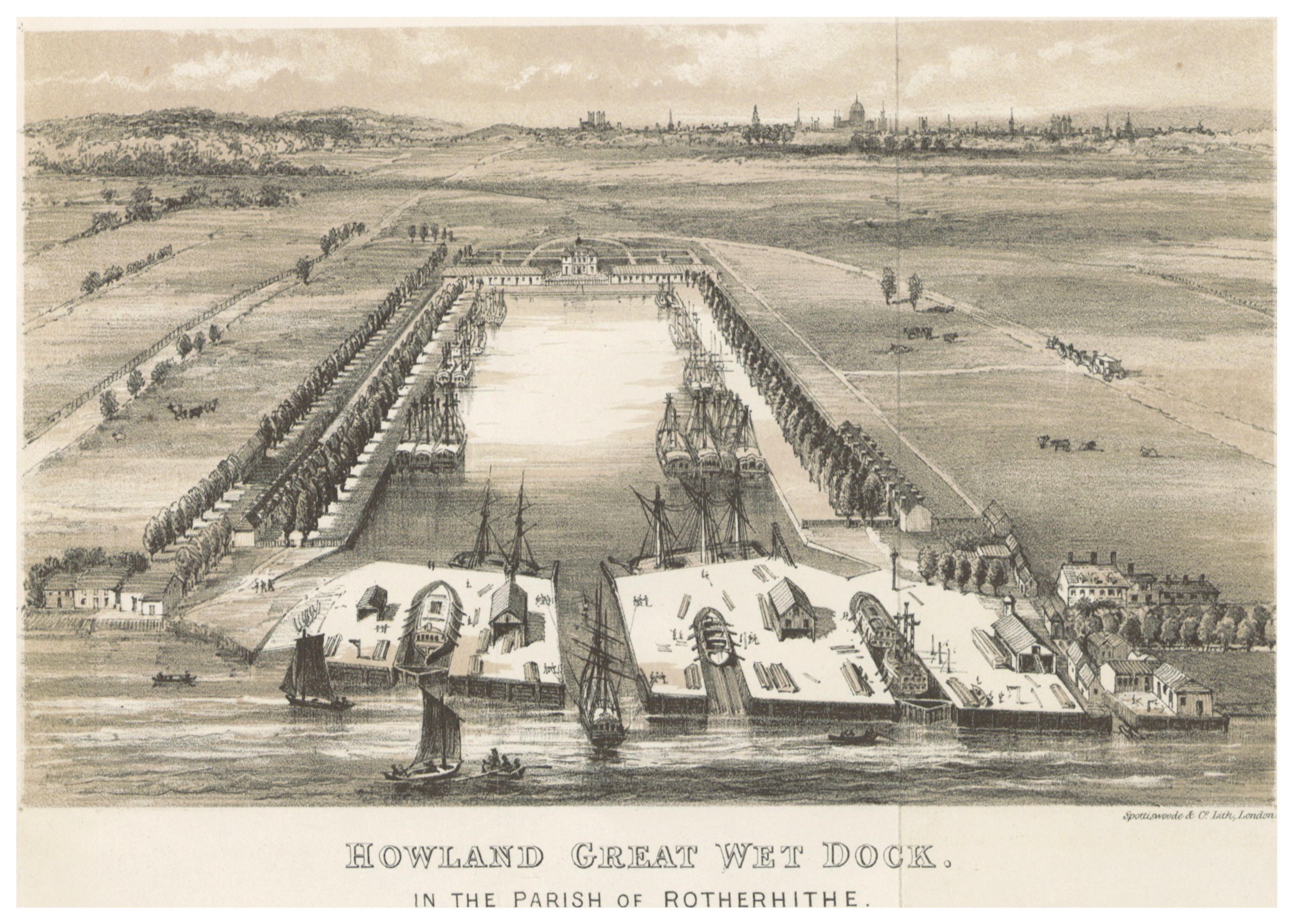
Howlands Dock in the parish of Rotherhithe (c. 1850)

A map showing the Rotherhithe wards of Bermondsey Metropolitan Borough as they appeared in 1916.

The docks were closed and largely filled in during the 1980s, and have now been replaced by modern housing and commercial facilities, but Rotherhithe retains much of its character and its maritime heritage. The largest surviving dock on the south bank, Greenland Dock, is the focal point for the southern part of the district, while there are many preserved wharves along the riverside at the north end of Rotherhithe. St. Mary's Church is at the centre of the old Rotherhithe village, which contains various historic buildings including the Brunel Engine House at the south end of the Thames Tunnel.

Canada Dock was the dock basin furthest away from the River Thames in the Surrey Docks complex, and it was linked to Albion Dock and Greenland Dock at its northern and south-eastern extremities via the Albion Canal. The dock has been remodelled, and its northwest half retained as an ornamental lake, renamed Canada Water. The canal has remained as a walkway and water feature within the redeveloped area.

Southwark Council and the Greater London Authority have announced a significant regeneration project focused on Canada Water and Rotherhithe. Known as the 'Canada Water Masterplan', the project has proposed the development of an additional 3,500 homes, as well as a new high street, town square, parks, leisure centre and footpath links. The landmark Tesco store will also be relocated. The project would be developed in multiple phases over the coming 15 to 20 years. Some local community groups oppose the plan based on environmental and cost considerations.

Rotherhithe is the home of the football team Fisher F.C. and Ballers Football Academy, who train & play fixtures at St Pauls Stadium. The Championship team Millwall Football Club is nearby in the London Borough of Lewisham.

The sustainable transport charity Sustrans has proposed the construction of a bicycle and pedestrian swing bridge from Rotherhithe to Canary Wharf, and cost-benefit and feasibility studies were undertaken. In January 2009 the London Mayor Boris Johnson said he would not fund the bridge, citing budget cuts due to the credit crunch, with the result that the project was effectively put on ice. However the idea is still being supported by Sustrans.

There are two Anglican churches in Rotherhithe: St. Mary's Church, and Holy Trinity Church, Rotherhithe. There are two Roman Catholic churches: St Peter and the Guardian Angels, and Our Lady of the Immaculate Conception.

=== King's Stairs Gardens ===
King's Stairs Gardens is a small park on the river towards the Bermondsey boundary. In September 2011 Thames Water announced that they wanted to build an access shaft for the "super-sewer" Thames Tideway Tunnel. Due to local action by The Save King's Stairs Gardens Campaign, which collected over 5000 signatures, Thames Water decided to build the access shaft in Chambers Wharf instead.

== Local landmarks and history ==
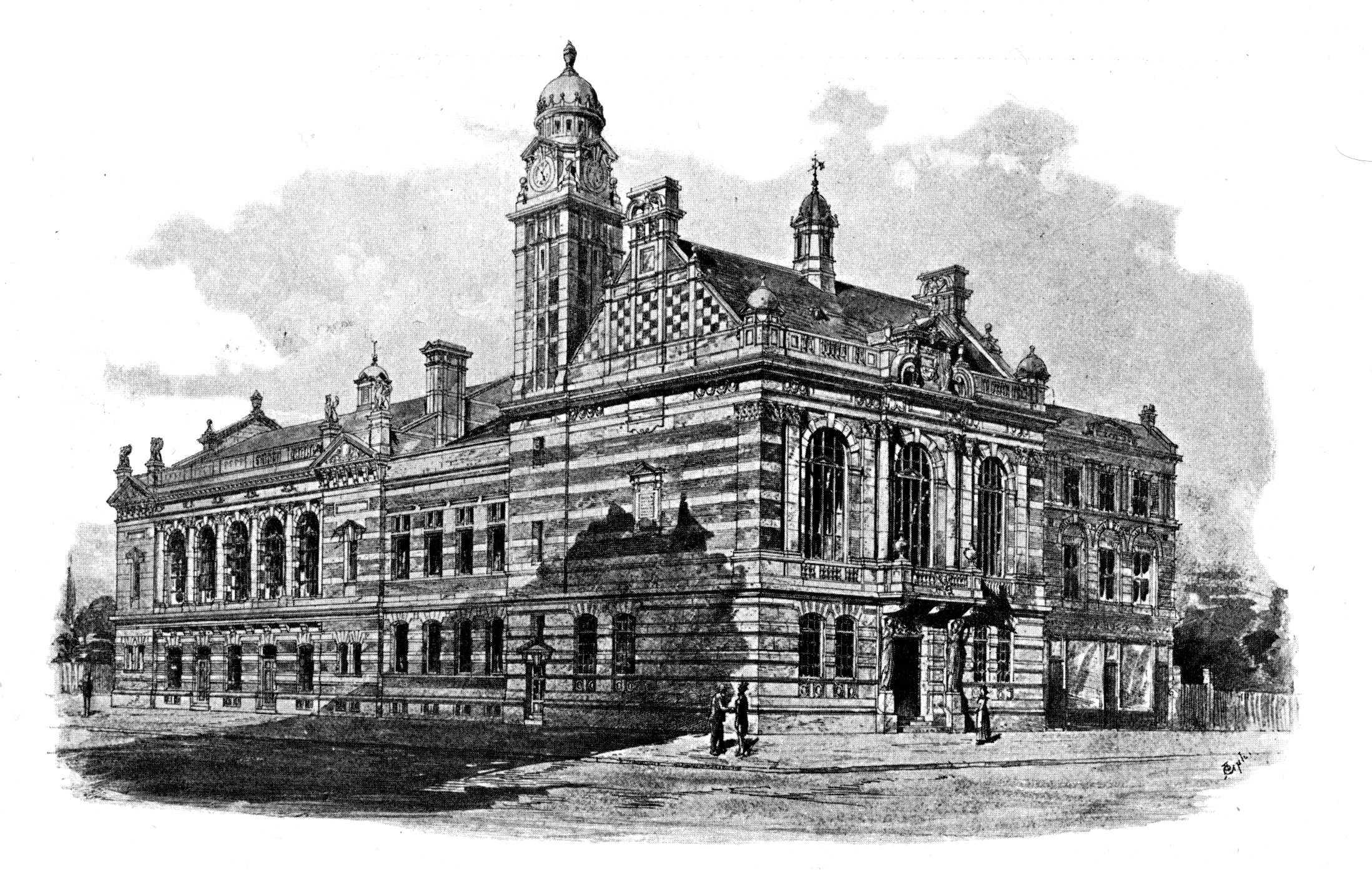
1895 accepted design for Rotherhithe Town Hall, view from Neptune Street and Lower Road

The Mayflower TRA Hall now occupies the site of the old Rotherhithe Town Hall. The building ceased to be a town hall in 1905 when the former Rotherhithe Council merged with the old Bermondsey Borough Council and the new council used premises in Spa Road. The old Rotherhithe Town Hall became a library and a museum. It was razed to the ground by repeated bomb hits and near misses during the Second World War (see below).

Rotherhithe had its own general hospital, St Olave's Hospital, on Lower Road close to the old town hall. Built originally in the early 1870s on land adjoining Rotherhithe Workhouse, it became the infirmary of St Olave's Union in 1875, and was renamed St Olave's Hospital in 1930. Subsequently, becoming part of the Guy's Hospital Teaching Group in 1966, it closed in 1985 and the site has been redeveloped into the residential Ann Moss Way.

The Terriss Theatre (named after the actor, William Terriss) opened in 1899 and was later renamed the Rotherhithe Hippodrome of Varieties. It stood on Lower Road by Culling Road. It was bombed in the 1940s and stood empty until demolition in 1955.

When the roundabout facing the Rotherhithe Tunnel was redeveloped in the early 1980s, several 19th-century buildings were demolished including a school and a nunnery. A public house, the "Europa", described in an early 20th-century history of the area as one its oldest, was also demolished.

The Daily Mail and Evening Standard newspapers were printed at Harmsworth Quays in Rotherhithe from 1989 to 2012. The building became the Printworks events venue until its demolition in 2024.

On 1 April 1904 the civil parish was abolished and merged with Bermondsey. At the 1901 census (the last before the abolition of the parish), Rotherhithe had a population of 38,460.

== Ecclesiastical parish ==
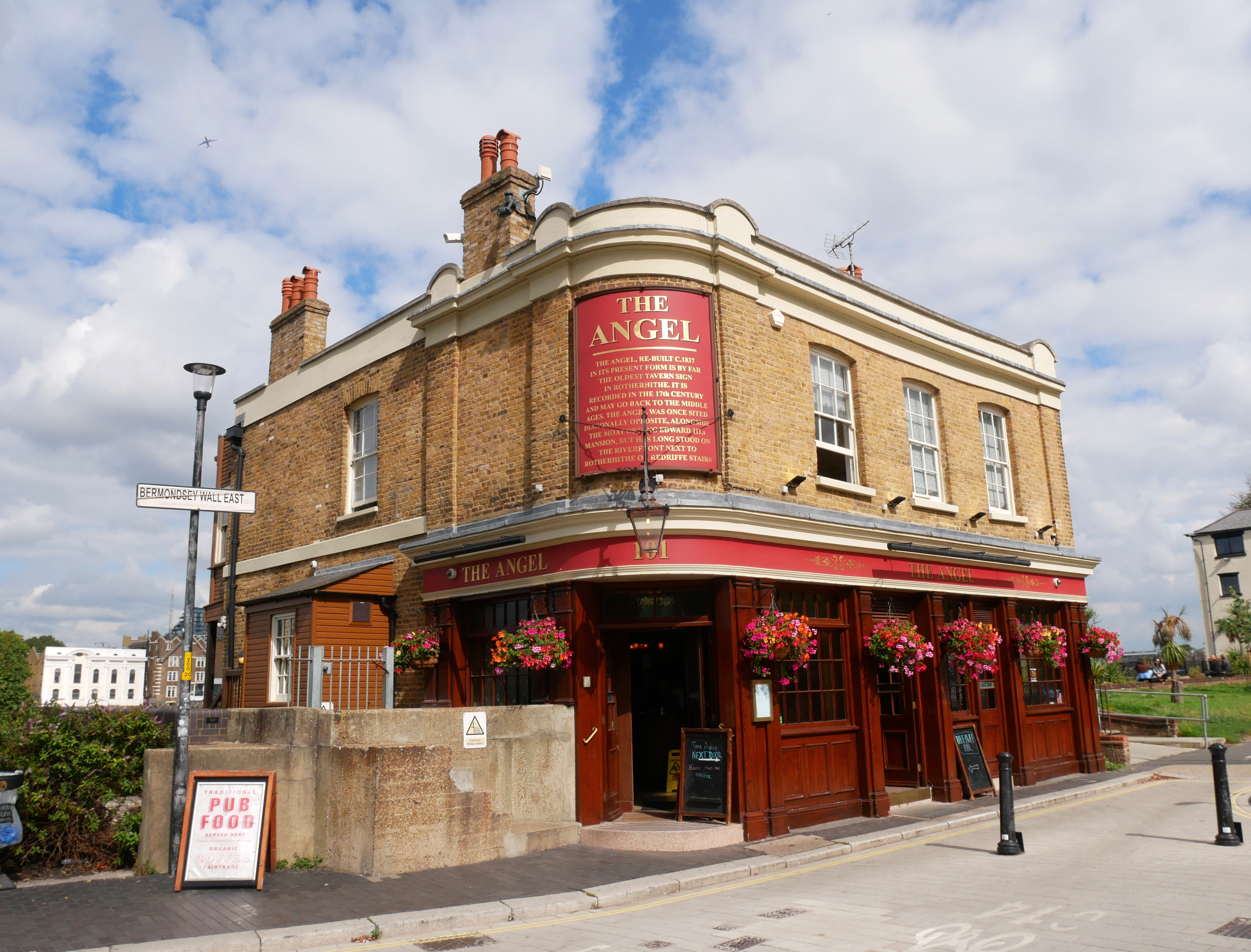
The Angel, a 19th-century pub in Rotherhithe now Grade II listed

The ancient parish, dedicated to St Mary, was in the Diocese of Winchester until 1877, then the Diocese of Rochester until 1905, and then finally in the Diocese of Southwark. From 1840, as the population of Rotherhithe increased, a number of new parishes were formed:

- Christ Church, Rotherhithe in 1840
- All Saints, Rotherhithe in 1842
- Holy Trinity, Rotherhithe in 1842
- St Barnabas, Rotherhithe in 1873

In addition, as the population of neighbouring Deptford increased, parts of Rotherhithe parish were included in the new parish of:

- St Katherine, Rotherhithe in 1886 with parts of St James, Hatcham

=== Nordic connection ===
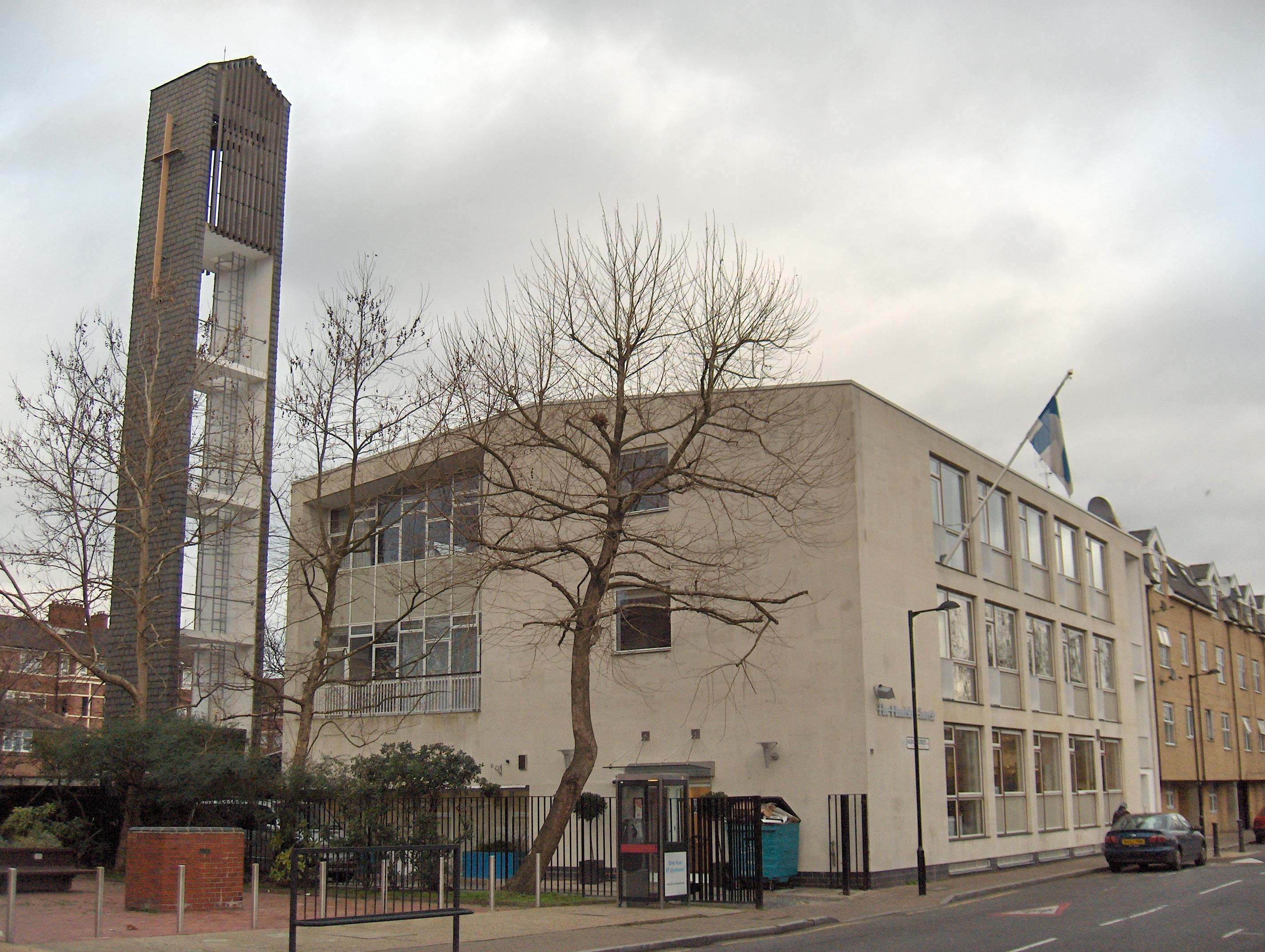
The Finnish Church, Albion Street

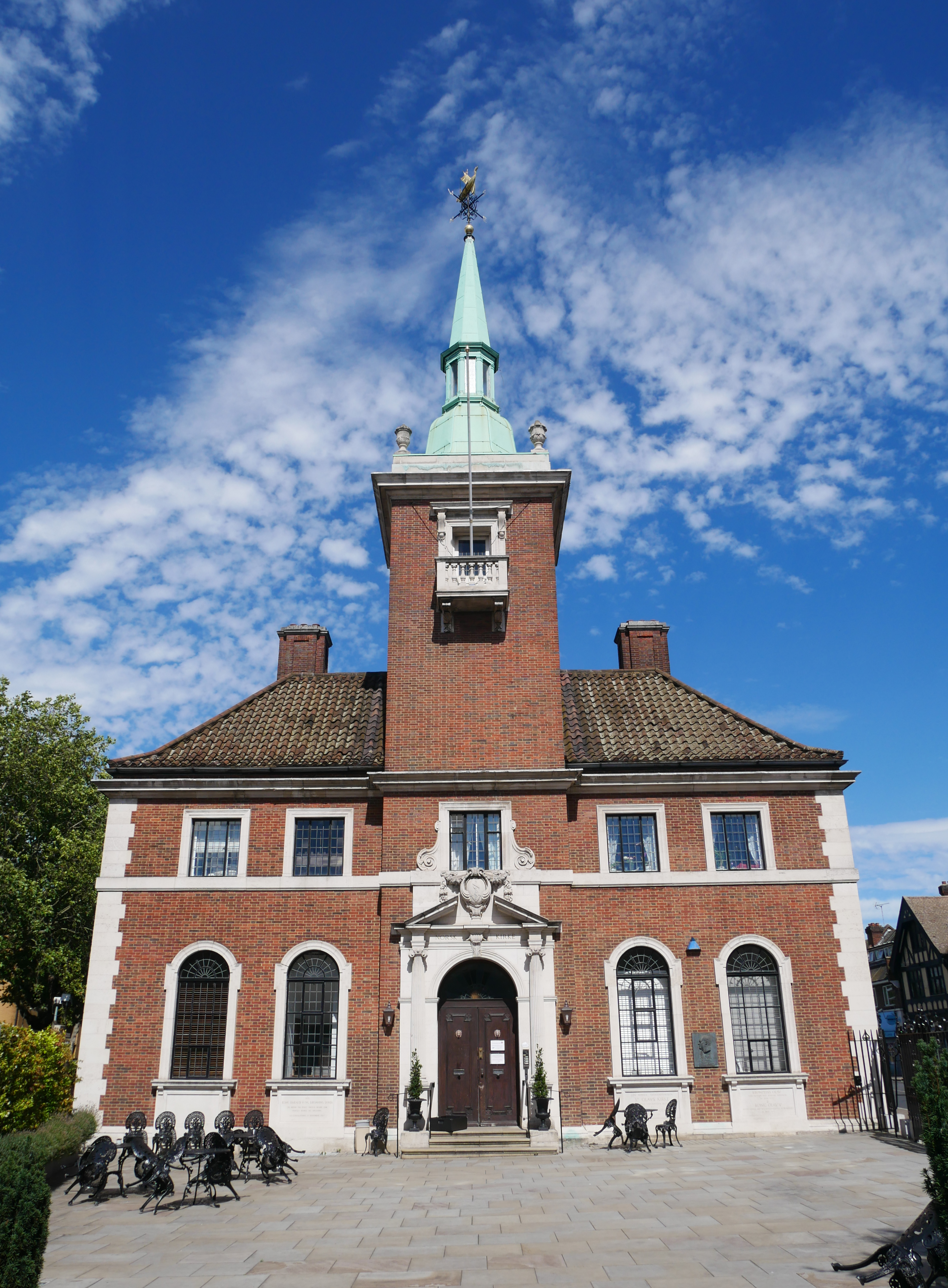
St Olav's, Rotherhithe's Norwegian church

Because much of the former Surrey Docks had strong trade links to Scandinavia and the Baltic region, the area is still home to a thriving Scandinavian community. During World War II, in fact, it housed the Norwegian Government-in-Exile. Originally established as seafarers' missions, Rotherhithe is home to a Norwegian, a Finnish and a Swedish church. The Finnish Church and the Norwegian Church are both in Albion Street; they were built in 1958 and 1927 respectively (Rotherhithe Library is between them). There are also a number of "community centres" for the Nordic community in London, including hostels, shops and cafés and even a sauna, mostly linked closely to the churches.

Some of the redeveloped areas were built by Nordic architects, such as the Greenland Passage development by Danish Company Kjær & Richter. This gives some areas a distinctly "Nordic" feel in terms of house and street design.

The relationship with Scandinavia and the Baltic is also reflected in the names of some of the buildings (such as the King Frederik IX Tower), the street names (e.g. Finland Street, Sweden Gate, Baltic Quay, Norway Gate, Helsinki Square) or other place names (e.g. Greenland Dock). Another major influence factor was trade with Russia and Canada (mainly timber), reflected in names such as Canada Water and the Russia Dock Woodland.

=== Other connections ===
Rotherhithe is also a popular place to live with South Africans, according to the UK census of 2011, and there was a South African themed pub at 351 Rotherhithe Street.

=== The Mayflower ===
In July 1620, the Mayflower sailed from Rotherhithe and picked up 65 passengers, probably from Blackwall, then proceeded to Southampton on the south coast of England to begin loading food and supplies for the voyage to America. At that time, the English Separatists, who later became known as the "Pilgrim Fathers", were mostly still living in the city of Leiden, in the Netherlands. There they hired a ship called the Speedwell to take them from Delfshaven in the Netherlands to Southampton to join the Mayflower.

The ship's master, Christopher Jones, died shortly after his return in 1621 and is buried in an unmarked grave at St Mary's Church. No one can be sure where on the Rotherhithe peninsula the Mayflower was berthed, but research by Graham Taylor shows that the inlet at Earl's Sluice is the likeliest place. The Mayflower pub, despite external and interior appearances, dates only from the 1950s. The extent to which the pub was damaged during the Second World War, and was rebuilt or simply restored, is uncertain.

=== China Hall ===
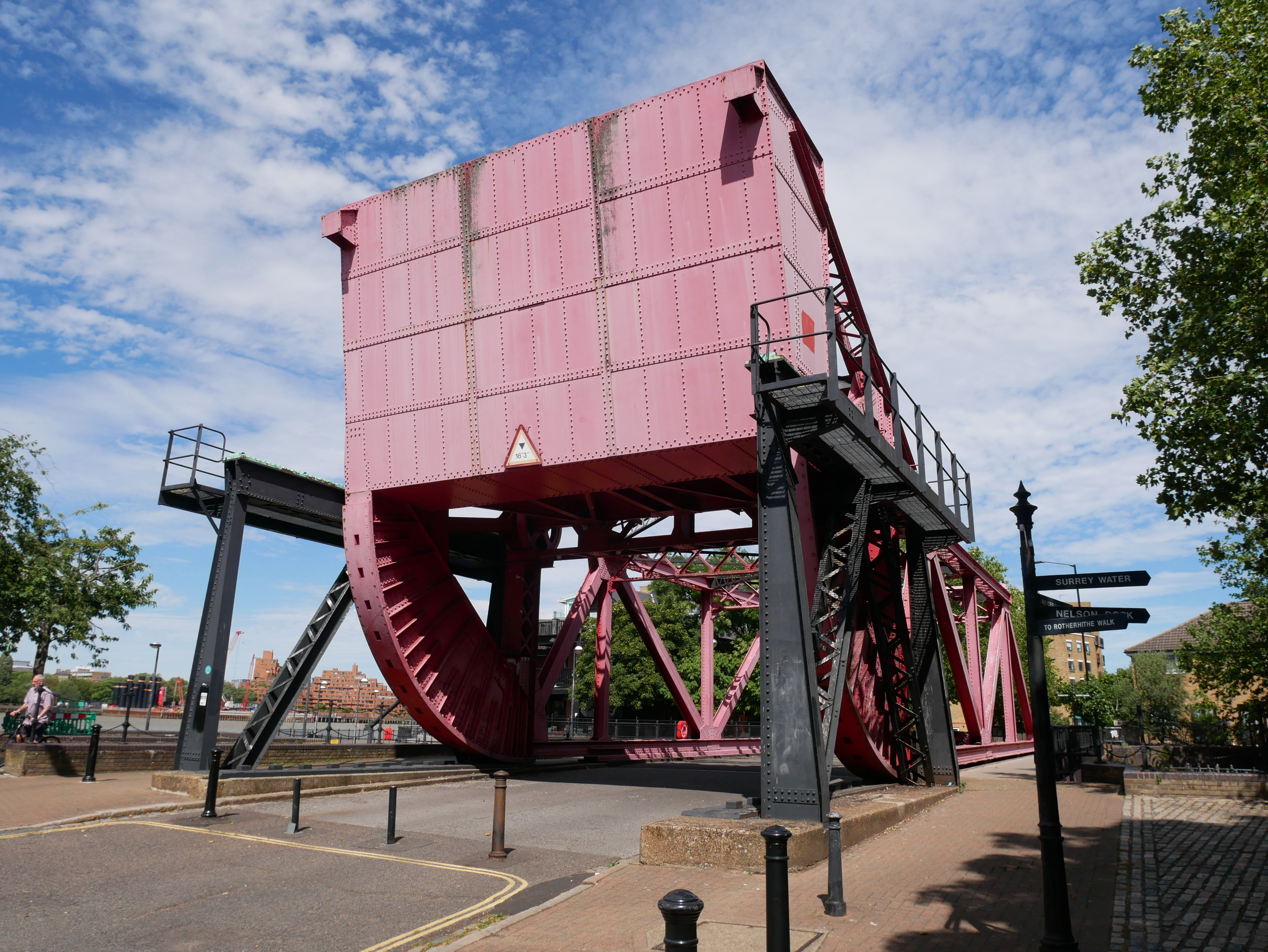
The 19th-century Surrey Lock in Rotherhithe, now a Grade II listed structure

On Lower Road, about halfway between Surrey Quays and Canada Water stations, there was a public house called the China Hall; at one time it was the entrance to a riparian playhouse visited by Samuel Pepys and mentioned in his diary. It is not known how long the theatre remained on the site, but it was reinvigorated in 1777 and George Frederick Cooke acted there the following year. In the winter of 1779, it was destroyed in fire. The site of the theatre became a well-known tea-gardens, with the "usual arbours and 'boxes'" during the Victorian period, but by the 1920s, most of the gardens had been absorbed into the Surrey Commercial Docks as part of a timber yard.

=== Second World War ===
Like the rest of the London Docks, the Surrey Commercial Docks were targeted by the Luftwaffe. On 7 September 1940, on the first day of the London Blitz, the deal yards of Surrey Docks were set ablaze. The raid ignited over a million tonnes of timber in Quebec Yard, causing the most intense single fire ever seen in Britain.

The bombing of the old Rotherhithe Town Hall during the Second World War gives an indication of how heavy the bombing in Rotherhithe was. The first damage to the building occurred when Luftwaffe bombs landed nearby in April 1941, and there was more bomb damage in February and June 1944. Later the same month (June 1944) the Town Hall was severely damaged by a direct hit from a V1 doodlebug. In November 1944 it was further damaged by near misses, and was finally destroyed by one of the last V1s to land on London.

King Haakon VII made many of his famous radio broadcasts to occupied Norway from Saint Olav's Norwegian Church in Rotherhithe, where the Norwegian royal family were regular worshippers during their exile.

== Geography ==
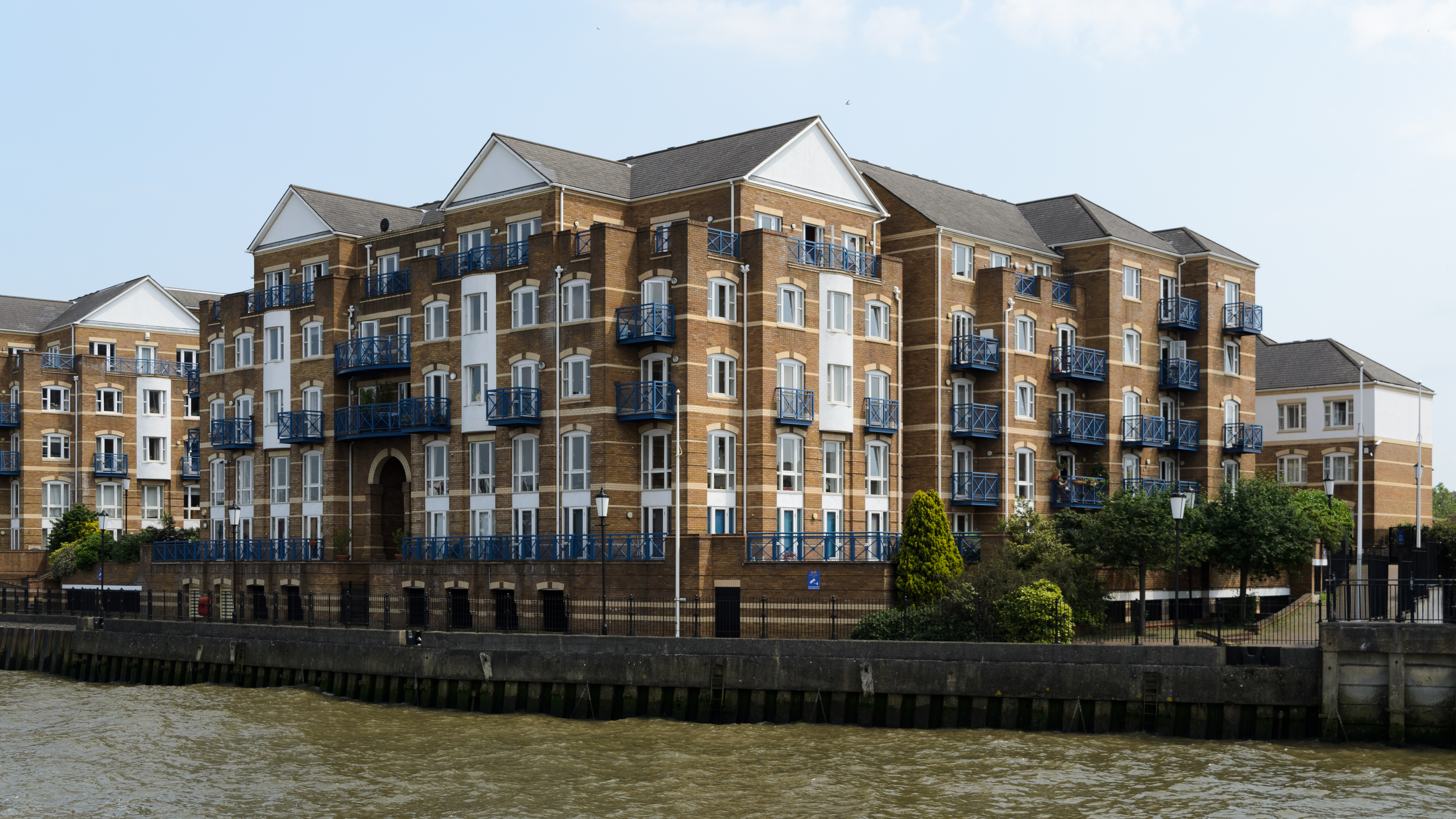
Several waterfront developments, such as Blenheim Court, can be seen from the Thames.

Rotherhithe is joined to the north bank of the Thames by three tunnels. The Thames Tunnel to Wapping was the first underwater tunnel in the world. Built by the Brunels, and originally intended to carry cross-river freight, it became a pedestrian tunnel due to the money running out to build the necessary ramps for vehicle traffic. It was used as a railway tunnel from 1869, and is now part of the London Overground network, which on 27 April 2010 started running trains on the route of the former East London Line. The later Rotherhithe Tunnel (opened 1908) carries a two-lane road to Limehouse. The Jubilee line extension (opened 1999) has a railway tunnel to Canary Wharf in the Isle of Dogs.

Parts of Rotherhithe Street were at one time or another called Jamaica Street, Lavender Street, Low Queen Street, Queen Street, Redriff Wall, Redriff, Rotherhithe Wall, Shipwright Street and Trinity Street.

In 1702 Edward Swallow built a shipyard near what is now Lavender Street. John Whetstone took over in 1709, Robert Inwood in 1756 and Job Cockshott in the early 1800s, when it was divided into Lavender Dock and Lavender Wharf. In 1862 William Walker re-amalgamated the dock and wharf, but in 1870 they were separated. From 1865 John and William Walker built clippers and W. Walker & Co, who had a 256 ft (78 m) dry dock on the Thames bank from 1869, built 17 ships there between 1866 and 1882. James Turner built ships there from 1873 to 1886, followed by John Medhurst until at least 1890.

Rotherhithe is part of the SE16 postcode district. Electorally, the western half is Rotherhithe ward of Southwark London Borough Council and the eastern half in Surrey Docks ward.

As much of Rotherhithe was occupied by the now-defunct Surrey Commercial Docks, the district is sometimes referred to as "Surrey Docks" or (since the late 1980s) "Surrey Quays", though the latter name tends to be used more for the southern half of the peninsula. An eastern part, which became an island when the docks were in use and the locks open, is called "Downtown". This name was never related to the idea of a "downtown" in the American sense, although there was a club of that name there for many years which has now closed. This part of Rotherhithe has since the 1980s been quiet and suburban in nature. Durand's Wharf is a park in Rotherhithe Street and holds an Outdoor Gym.

The legacy of the Surrey Commercial Docks continues to influence local toponymy. Dalton Cross, the area surrounding the junction of Redriff Road and Quebec Way, is believed to be named after the intersecting railway lines that once ran between timber ponds owned by the prominent Dalton family, who were active in the area's timber trade during the docklands' operational years.

== Notable people ==
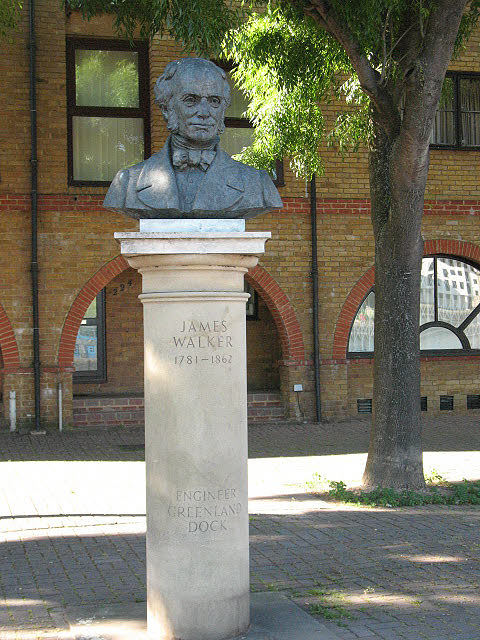
Bust of the Scottish civil engineer James Walker at Greenland Dock

- Bobby Abel (1857–1936), cricketer for Surrey County Cricket Club and the England Cricket Team, was born in Rotherhithe.
- Marc Isambard Brunel (1769–1849) and his son Isambard Kingdom Brunel (1806–1859) built the Thames Tunnel between Rotherhithe and Wapping.
- Max Bygraves (1922–2012), entertainer, was born in Rotherhithe.
- Michael Caine (born 1933), actor, was born Maurice Joseph Micklewhite in Rotherhithe.
- Thomas Coram (1668–1751) a philanthropic sea captain, retired to Rotherhithe where he campaigned for establishment of the Foundling Hospital.
- Eliza Fay (1755 or 1756–1816), author of Original Letters from India (1817), was born in Rotherhithe.
- Malcolm Hardee (1950–2005), comedian, lived on a houseboat in Greenland Dock, Rotherhithe. He owned and ran the Wibbley Wobbley pub-boat on the same dock, and was drowned there.
- John Short Hewett (1781–1835) cleric and academic, was Rector of Rotherhithe between 1817 and 1835
- Sir James Kemnal (1864–1927) industrialist
- Myleene Klass (born 1978), singer, lived in Rotherhithe in the early 2000s.
- George Lambourn (1900–1977), artist, was born in Rotherhithe.
- Sean Lock (1963–2021), comedian, lived in Rotherhithe in the 1990s.
- Aaron Manby (1776–1850) assembled and launched the world's first seagoing iron-hulled ship at Rotherhithe in 1822.
- Billy Mehmet (born 1985), professional footballer, attended Bacon's College in Rotherhithe in the 1990s.
- David Haye (born 1980), professional boxer, attended Bacon's College in Rotherhithe in the 1990s.
- King Mutesa II of Buganda (1925–1969) died in exile in his flat in Rotherhithe in 1969 following an interview with journalist John Simpson.
- Carol Raye (1923–2022), actress
- George Tate (1700 1794), Royal Navy captain
- James Townsend Saward (1798–c1875) Victorian English barrister and forger was born in Rotherhithe.
- James Walker (1781–1862) worked on the design and construction of Greenland Dock, where a memorial bust of him stands.
- Joan Wall (1933–2023), field hockey player and sports administrator, born in Rotherhithe.
- Alfred Salter (16 June 1873 – 24 August 1945) British medical practitioner and Labour Party politician Alfred Salter

== Main sights ==
- Brunel Engine House
- Finnish Church
- Canada Water
- Southwark Park
- Greenland Dock
- Lavender Pond
- Russia Dock Woodland
- South Dock
- Stave Hill (including Ecological Park)
- St. Mary's Church
- Thames Tunnel
- Surrey Docks Farm
- Nelson Dock Pier
- Cuckold's Point
- King Edward III’s Manor House

== Transport ==
=== Railway ===
Rotherhithe is served by three stations:

- Rotherhithe railway station was formerly a London Underground station on the East London Line; it was rebuilt as a London Overground station and reopened on 27 April 2010. It is located near to the river, to the north. It's now part of the Windrush line on the London Overgound network.
- Surrey Quays railway station is located to the south of the district. It was also an Underground station and was converted to the Overground network at the same time as Rotherhithe station. Like the other stations, it's now part of the Windrush line.
- Canada Water tube station is located in central Rotherhithe. It is now an important transport interchange, as both London Overground's East London line (Now the Windrush line) and the Jubilee line of the London Underground serve it; there is also a bus station here. This station is at the centre of a major regeneration project, with rapid construction of new flats.

Other nearby stations are Bermondsey tube station (also on the Jubilee line), South Bermondsey railway station to the south-west and London Bridge railway station to the west.

=== Buses ===
The area is served by Transport for London bus services 1, 47, 188, 199, 225, 381, C10 and P12; night buses N1, N199 and N381 also stop here. Canada Water bus station is an important stop and interchange, given that it is right next to the tube station.

=== Walking and cycling ===
The riverbank carries part of the Richmond – Thames Barrier (28 miles – 45 km) section of the Thames Path through London. Most of the riverbank is accessible, apart from sections where warehouses and estates have established rights to the riverside.

A new bridge for pedestrians and cyclists has been proposed between Rotherhithe and Canary Wharf.

=== Taxis ===
London taxis (black cabs) can often be found on Salter Road.

=== River boat ===
- Greenland Dock Pier are served by Thames Clippers routes RB1, RB2, RB6 and RBS.
- Docklands Pier for Canary Wharf – Rotherhithe Ferry only

Preceding station	London River Services	Following station
Canary Wharf Pier Terminus	RB4	Terminus
Canary Wharf Pier towards Battersea Power Station Pier	RB1	Masthouse Terrace Pier towards Barking Riverside Pier

== Gallery ==
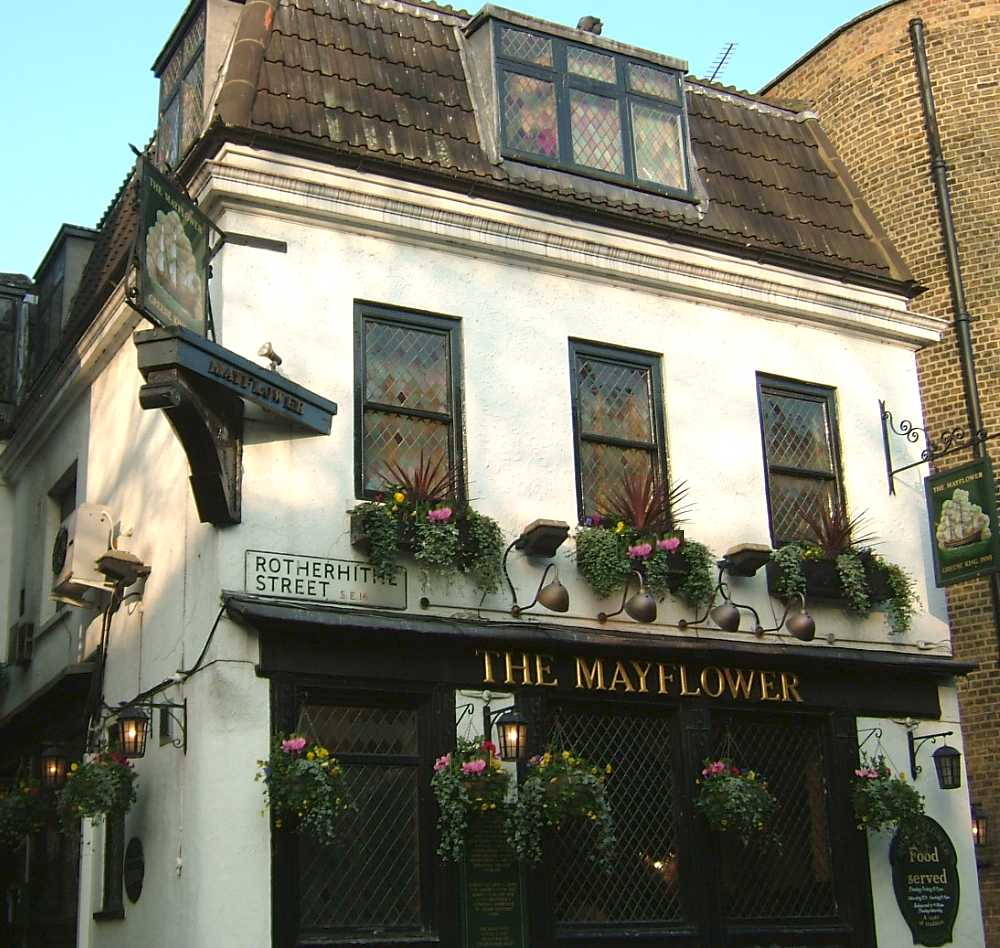
Mayflower public house

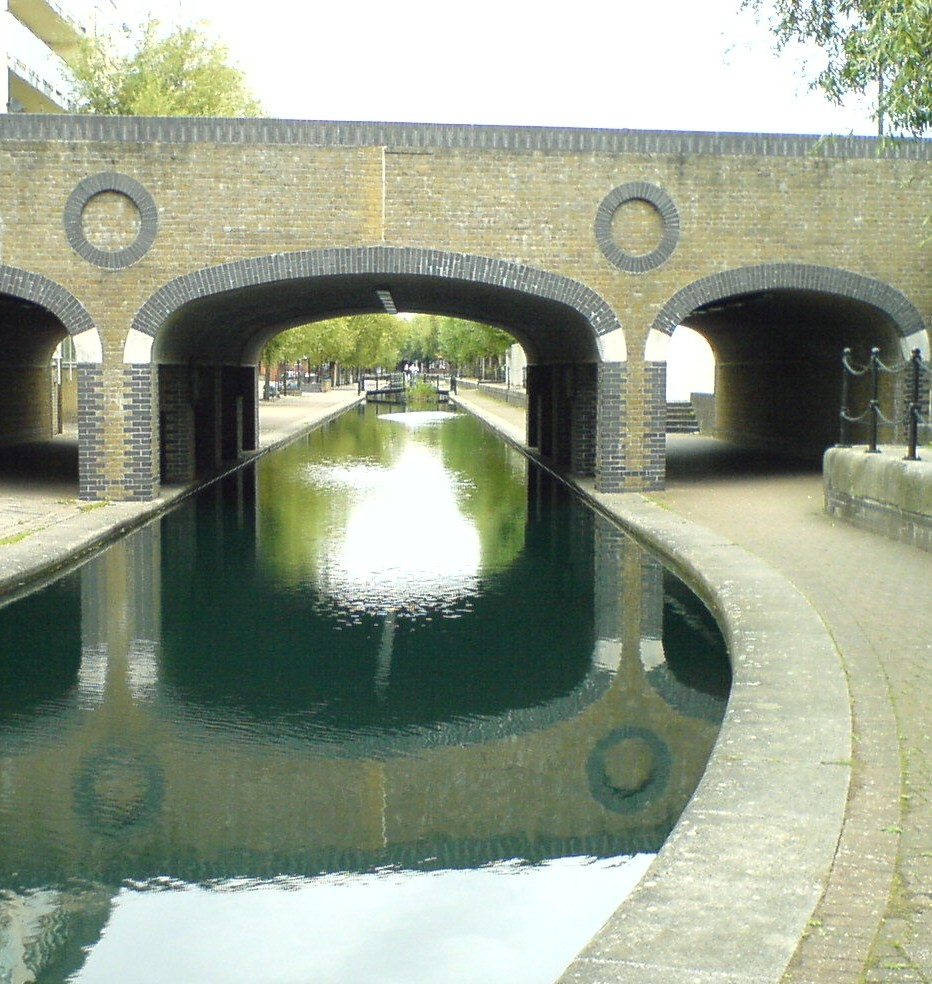
Albion Channel

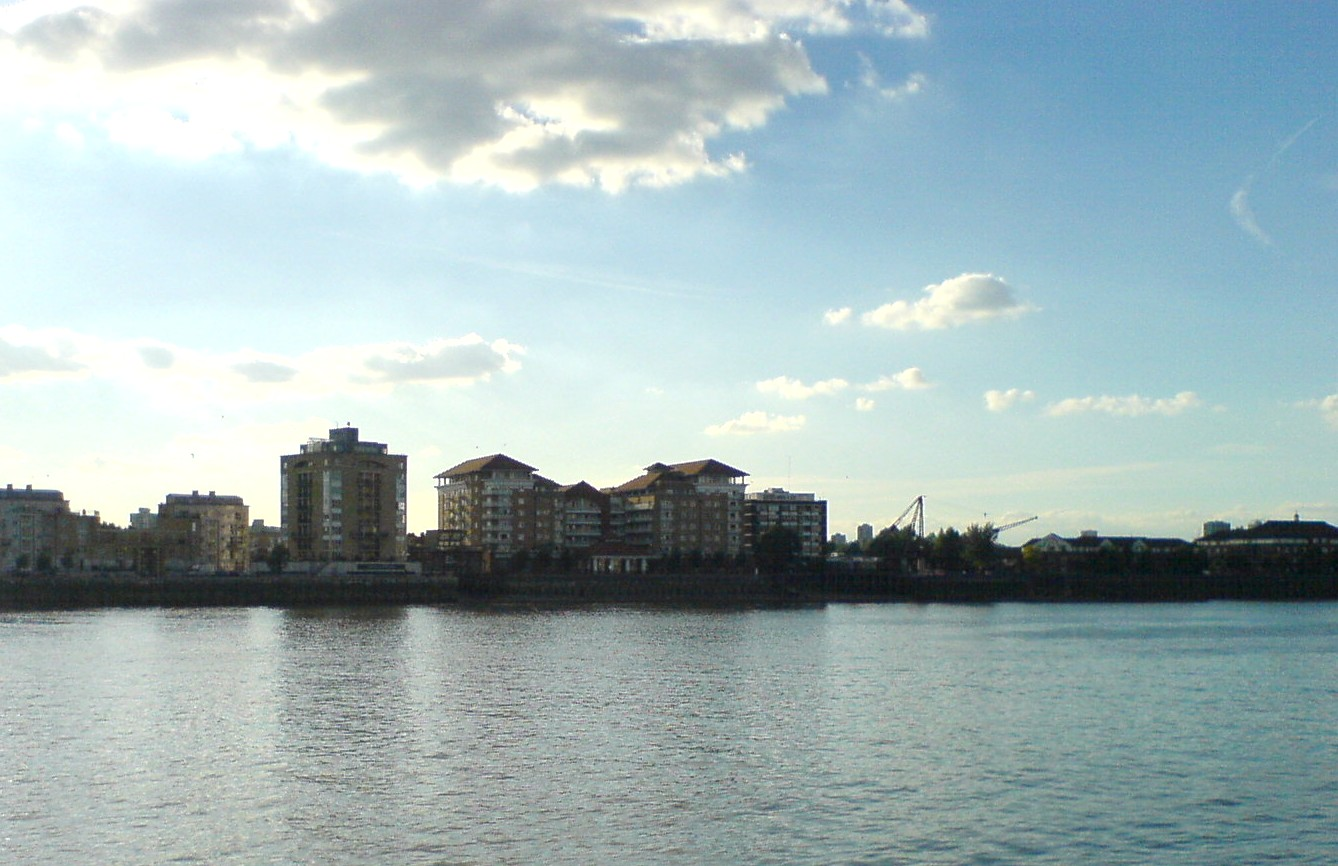
Riverside developments

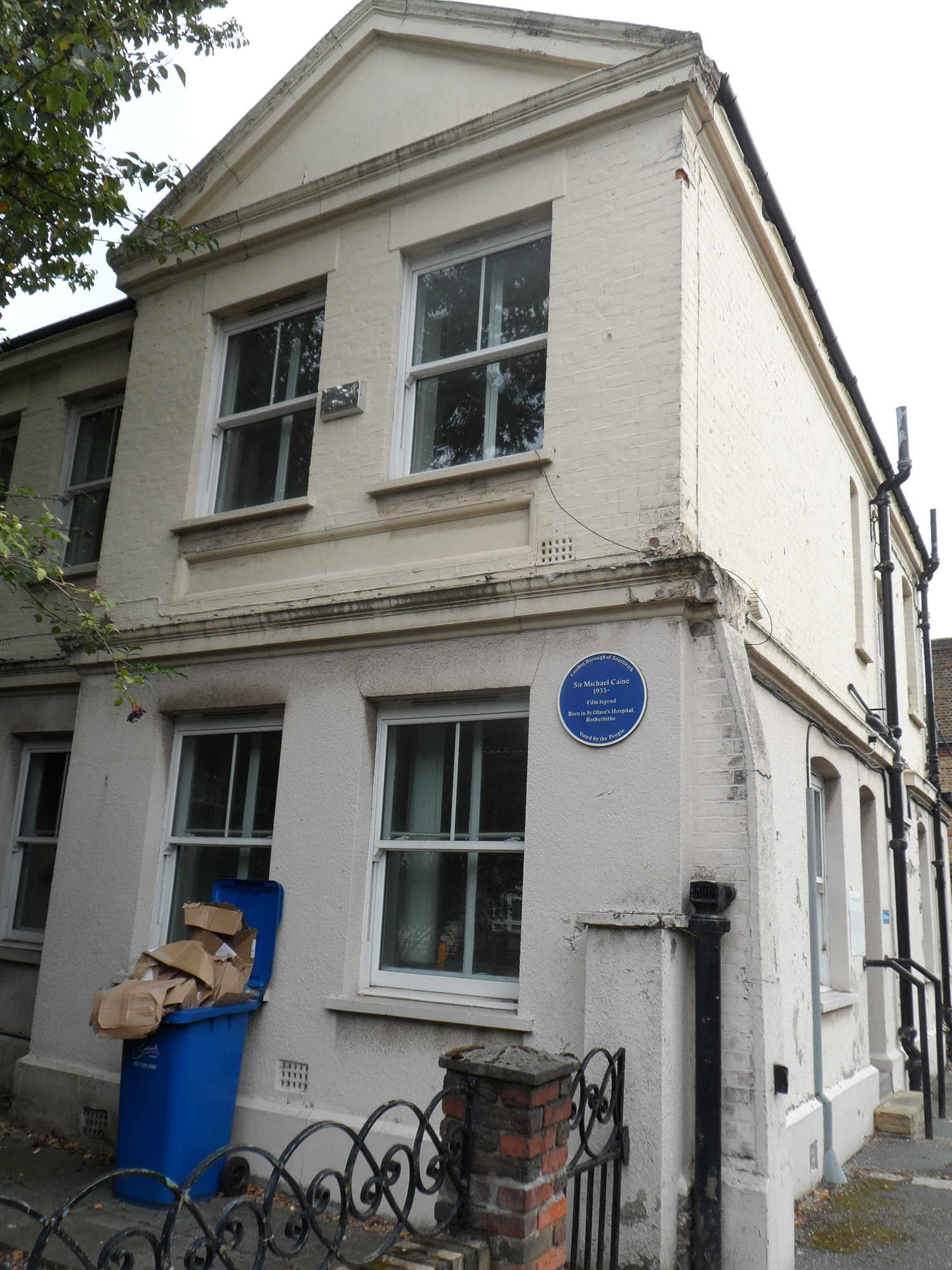
St Olave's Hospital
