= Rotherhithe Pier =

River Thames pier in London, England

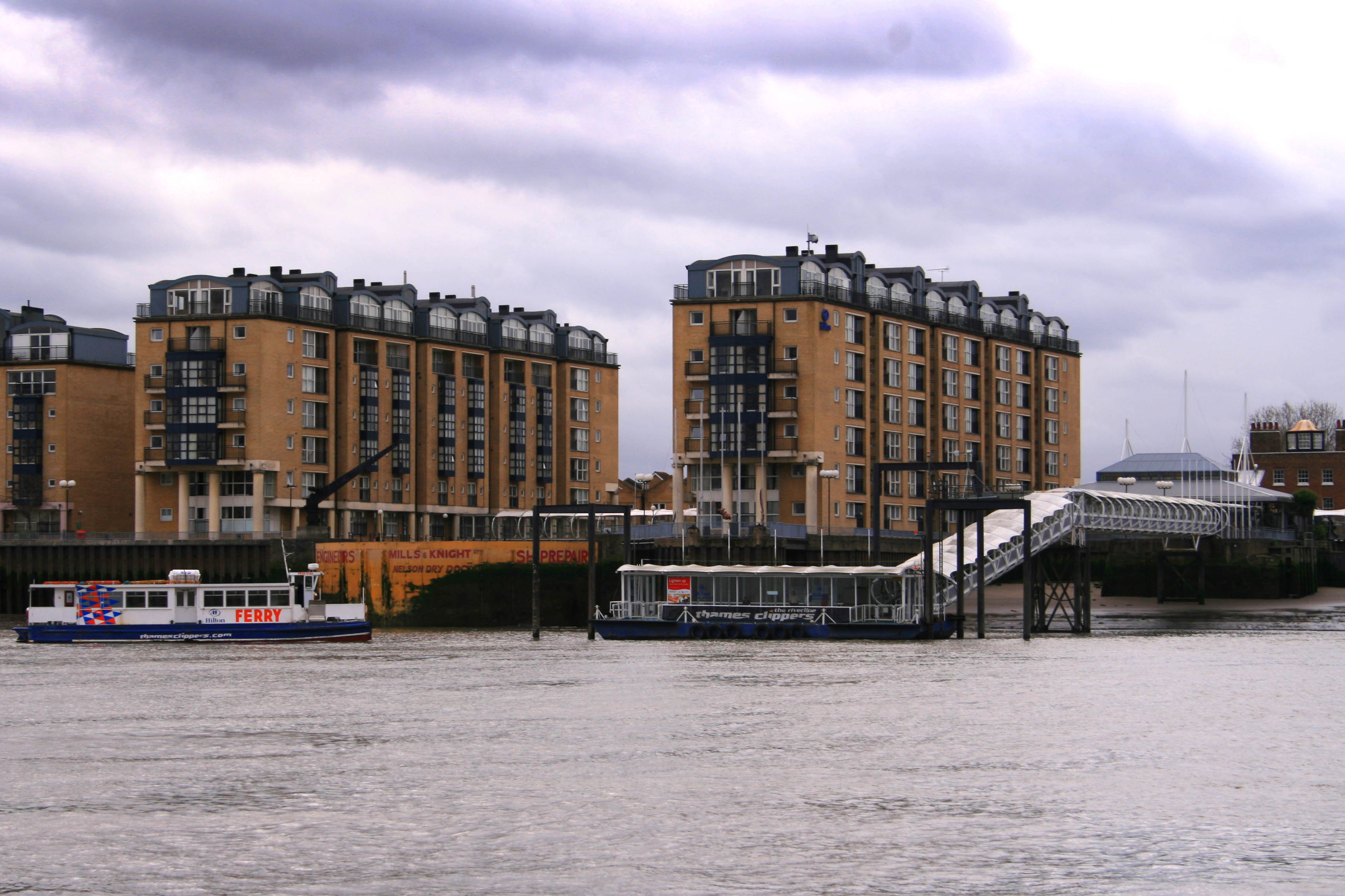
- The Canary Wharf Ferry approaching the pier
- Type: River bus services
- Location: River Thames, London, England
- Coordinates: 51.504555°N 0.031811°W
- Owner: London River Services
- Operator: Uber Boat by Thames Clippers

History
- Location within London Borough of Southwark

Rotherhithe Pier is a pier on the south bank of the River Thames in Rotherhithe, London, England. It lies to the south of Columbia Wharf.

== Services ==
The pier is served by the river bus RB4 Canary Wharf – Rotherhithe Ferry, which crosses the Thames to the Canary Wharf business district. Boats operate roughly every 10 minutes, and are operated by Uber Boat by Thames Clippers under licence from London River Services, the river transport arm of Transport for London. Selected RB1 and RB6 services also stop at this pier.

Rotherhithe Pier serves the DoubleTree by Hilton London Docklands Riverside Hotel, and the ferry can be used both by guests of the hotel as well as by passengers not staying at the hotel.

Canary Wharf Pier on the other side of the river provides interchange with Thames Clippers RB1 river bus services along the River Thames into central London, as well as an interchange with various other Transport for London services including the Jubilee line at the nearby Canary Wharf tube station, the Elizabeth line at Canary Wharf railway station and the Docklands Light Railway at Canary Wharf DLR station.

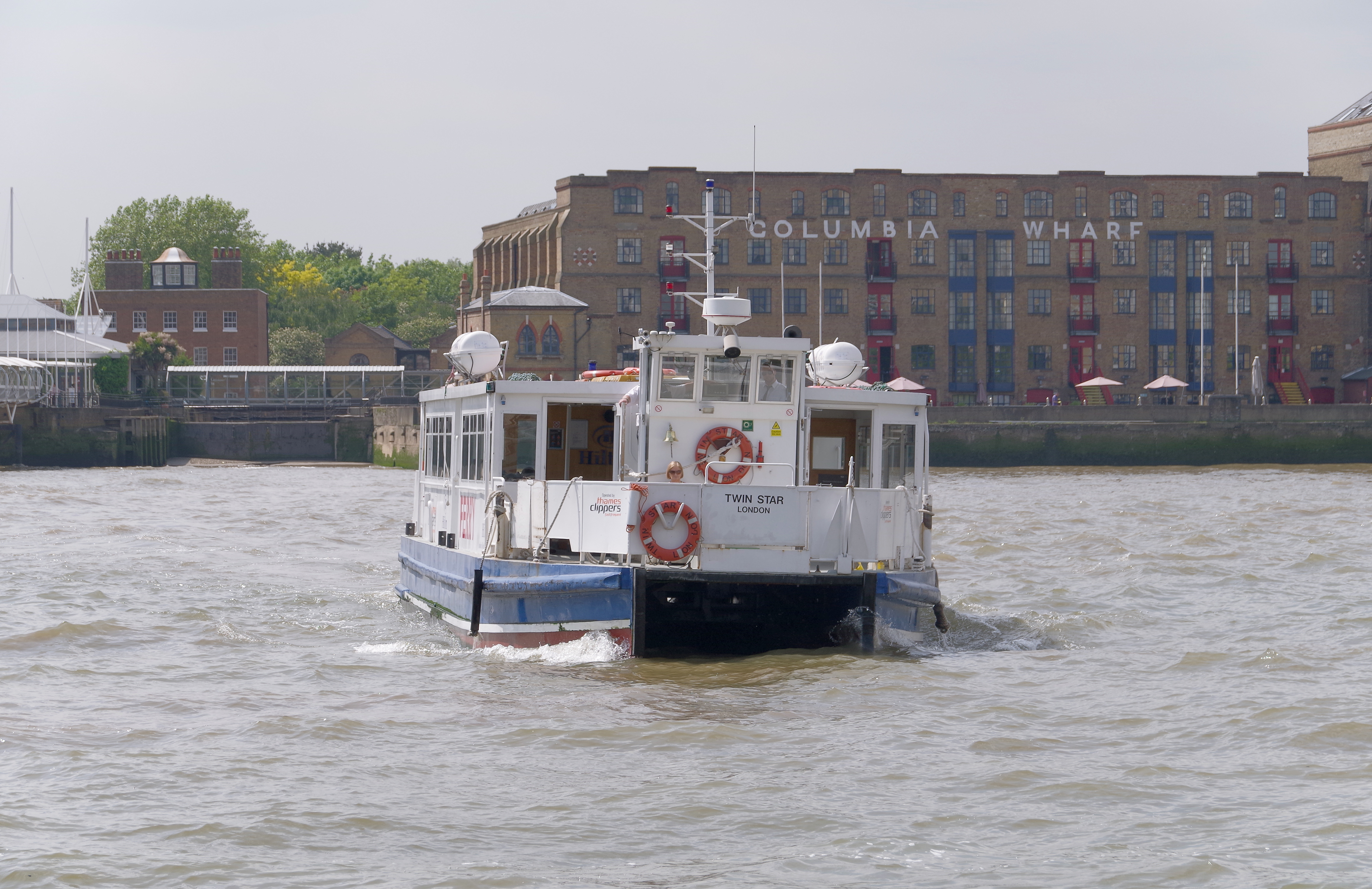
The ferry approaching Rotherhithe Pier

== History ==
The pier was designed by Beckett Rankine and constructed by Downtown Marine Construction, the architect was Price and Cullen. The pier was formerly named after the Nelson Dock, a 17th-century dry dock which was used for shipbuilding until 1968. The dock is not thought to have been named after Horatio Nelson, in spite of his historical connections to the area.

Preceding station	London River Services	Following station
Canary Wharf Pier towards Battersea Power Station Pier	RB1	Greenland (Surrey Quays) Pier towards Barking Riverside Pier
Canary Wharf Pier Terminus	RB4	Terminus
Canary Wharf Pier towards Putney Pier	RB6	Greenland (Surrey Quays) Pier towards Barking Riverside Pier
