= London River Services =

Licenser of river services, part of Transport for London

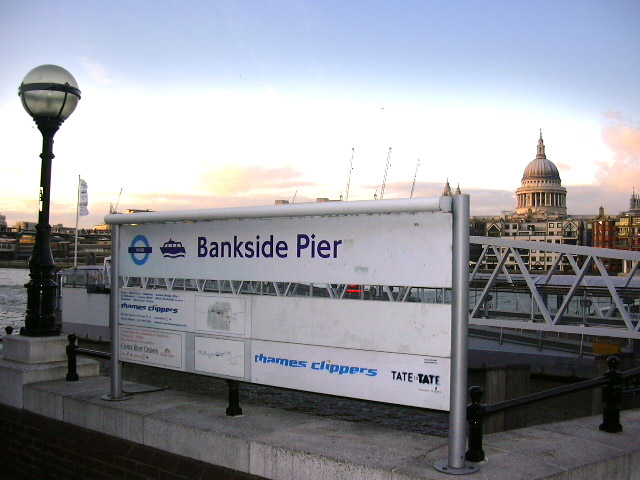
- Locale: London, England
- Waterway: River Thames
- Transit type: Commuter boats, ferries and tourist/leisure services
- Owner: Transport for London
- Operator: Various boat companies
- Began operation: 1999
- No. of terminals: 25 (8 managed by TfL)
- Website: http://www.tfl.gov.uk/river

London River Services Limited is a division of Transport for London (TfL), which manages passenger transport, leisure-oriented tourist services and commuter services along the River Thames in and around London. It does not own or operate any boats itself, except those on the Woolwich Ferry, but licences the services of operators.

The Thames had been used as a common means of transport in London for centuries, but use died off in the early 1900s, as transportation was enhanced (and river traffic somewhat blocked) with a proliferation of bridges and tunnels. With these numerous north–south crossings of the Thames, which is generally no more than 300 m (980 ft) wide as it flows through central London, the revival of river boat services in London therefore mostly travel east or west along the Thames rather than across it; the only major cross-river ferry services can be found further downstream where the river is much wider, and there are far fewer bridge or tunnel crossings.

The decision to revive London's river service network moved forward in 1997 with the launch of "Thames", a £21-million project (£41 million today) to regenerate the River Thames and create new passenger transport services on the Thames. While the service is not as extensive as those in Hong Kong or Sydney, it has been growing: in 2007, more than 700,000 commuters travelled by river on Thames Clippers services, one of the operators on the system; in 2013 the Thames Clippers service had grown to 3.3 million, as it had become more integrated into the tube, rail and bus ticketing system; in 2014 their figures were 3.8 million; in 2015 it was forecasted that their ridership would increase to 4.3 million by 2016, supported by the addition of new Clipper boats. By 2018, there were 21 different operators carrying daily commuter, leisure, charter, or sightseeing passengers to various combinations of the 33 piers along the system.

== History ==
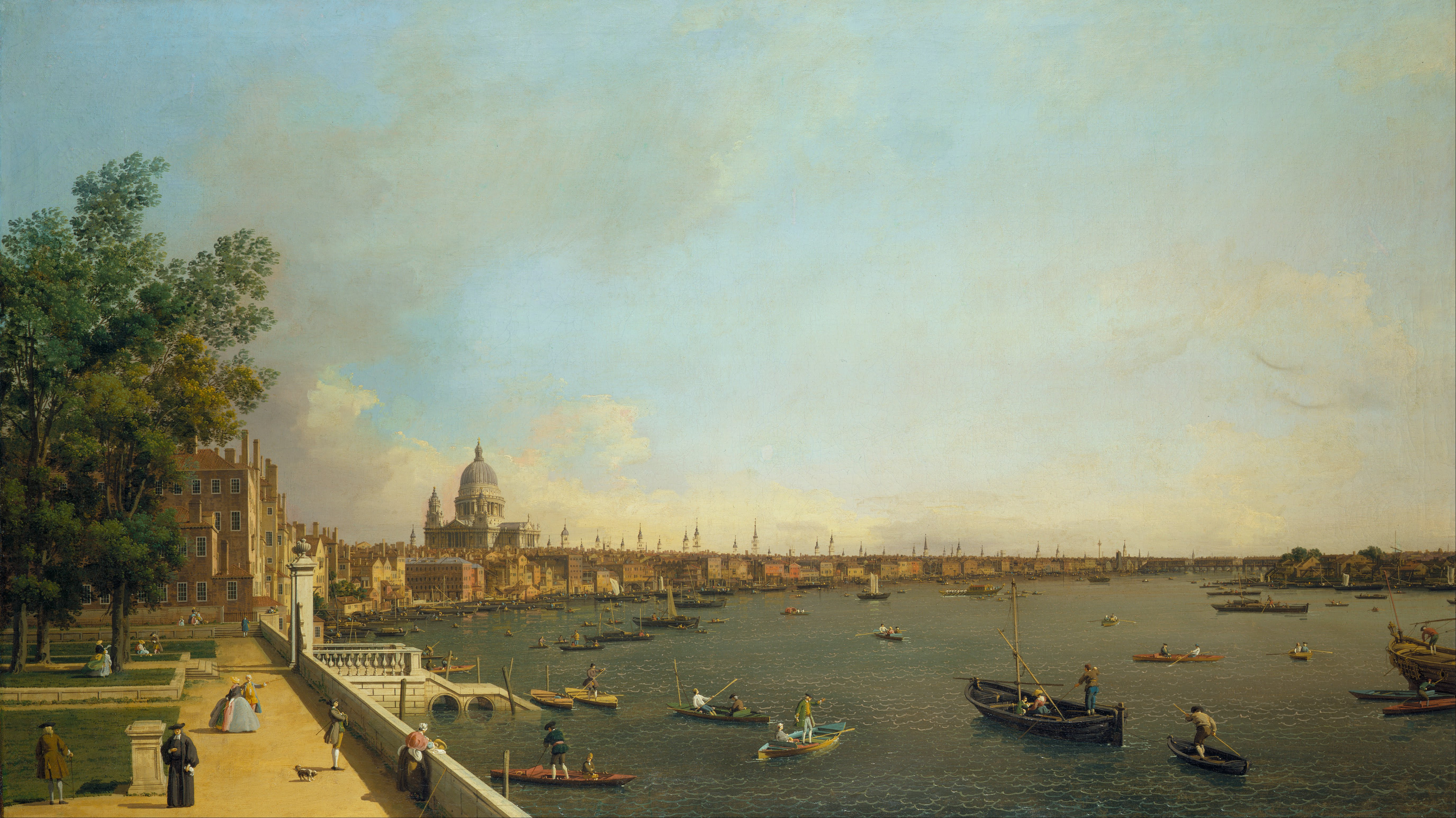
18th-century view of river traffic in Canaletto's painting The Thames from Somerset House Terrace towards the City (1751)

Before the construction of London's bridges and the Underground, the River Thames had served as a major thoroughfare for centuries. Attempts to regulate the transport of passengers and goods began in 1197, when King Richard I sold the Crown's rights over the Thames to the City of London Corporation, which then attempted to license boats on the river. In 1510 Henry VIII granted a licence to watermen that gave exclusive rights to carry passengers on the river, and in 1555 an Act of Parliament set up the Company of Watermen and Lightermen to control traffic on the Thames.

For centuries the only bridge across the Thames was London Bridge. Crossing the river by wherry (small wooden rowing boat) was a common mode of transport.

=== 19th century ===
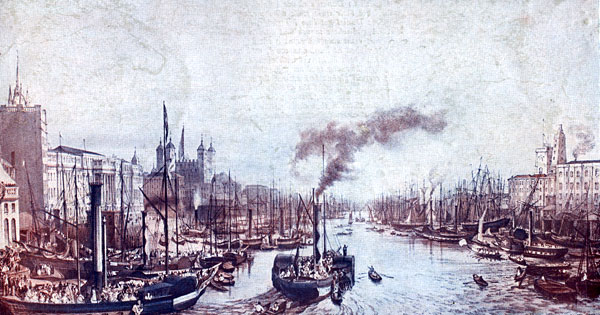
Steamers on the Thames in 1841

Passenger steamboats were introduced in 1815 and the use of the river as a means of public transport increased greatly. River services ran from Gravesend, Margate and Ramsgate via Greenwich and Woolwich into central London. By the mid-1850s about 15,000 people per day travelled to work on steamboat services – twice the number of passengers on the newly emerging railways. With increased congestion on the river, collisions and other accidents became correspondingly more frequent, most notably with the Princess Alice disaster at Woolwich in 1878.

While the introduction of large steamboats and bridge construction had taken business from the Thames watermen, the growth of the railways took passengers away from the steamboat services and the use of the river for public transport began a steady decline. River service companies struggled financially, and in 1876 the five main boat companies merged to form the London Steamboat Company. The company ran a half-hourly service from Chelsea to Greenwich for eight years until it went bankrupt in 1884. Nevertheless, river services continued under different management into the next century. Many of the Thames paddle steamers around this time were built by the Thames Ironworks at Bow Creek.

=== 20th century ===
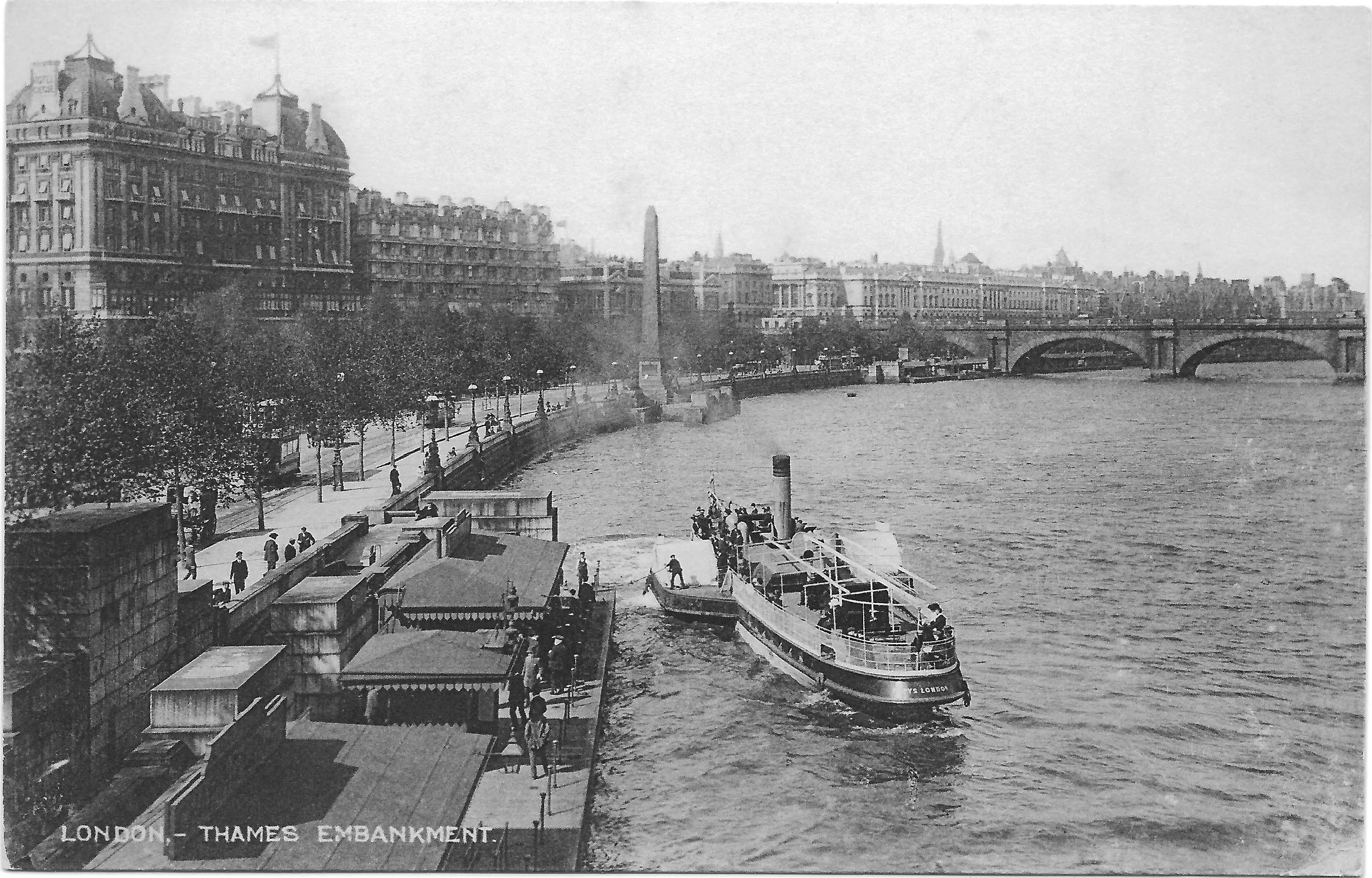
Paddle-steamer Pepys used in the 1905-1907 service

In 1905 the London County Council (LCC) launched its own public river transport service to complement its new tram network, acquiring piers and investing in a large fleet of 30 paddle-steamers. Frequent services operated from Hammersmith to Greenwich. The LCC river service was not a success; in the first year it ran up debts of £30,000. It was shut down in 1907 after only two years' service.

Numerous proposals for "river bus" services were considered throughout the 20th century, although the few that were realised were cancelled after a short time in service. During World War II, from 13 September 1940 to 2 November 1940, a temporary wartime river bus service was introduced, running every 20 minutes, between Westminster and Woolwich using converted pleasure cruisers provided by the Port of London Authority to replace train, tram and trolleybus services which were disrupted by the bombing of the Blitz. London Transport bus inspectors and conductors issued and checked the tickets on board the boats.

With the move of the Port of London downstream in the 1960s, regular river transport was limited to a few sightseeing boats.

=== Revival of passenger services ===
In 1997 Secretary of State for Transport John Prescott launched Thames 2000, a £21-million project to regenerate the River Thames in time for the Millennium Celebrations and boost new passenger transport services on the Thames. The centrepiece of these celebrations was to be the Millennium Dome, but there was also a plan to provide a longer-term legacy of public transport boat services and piers on the river.

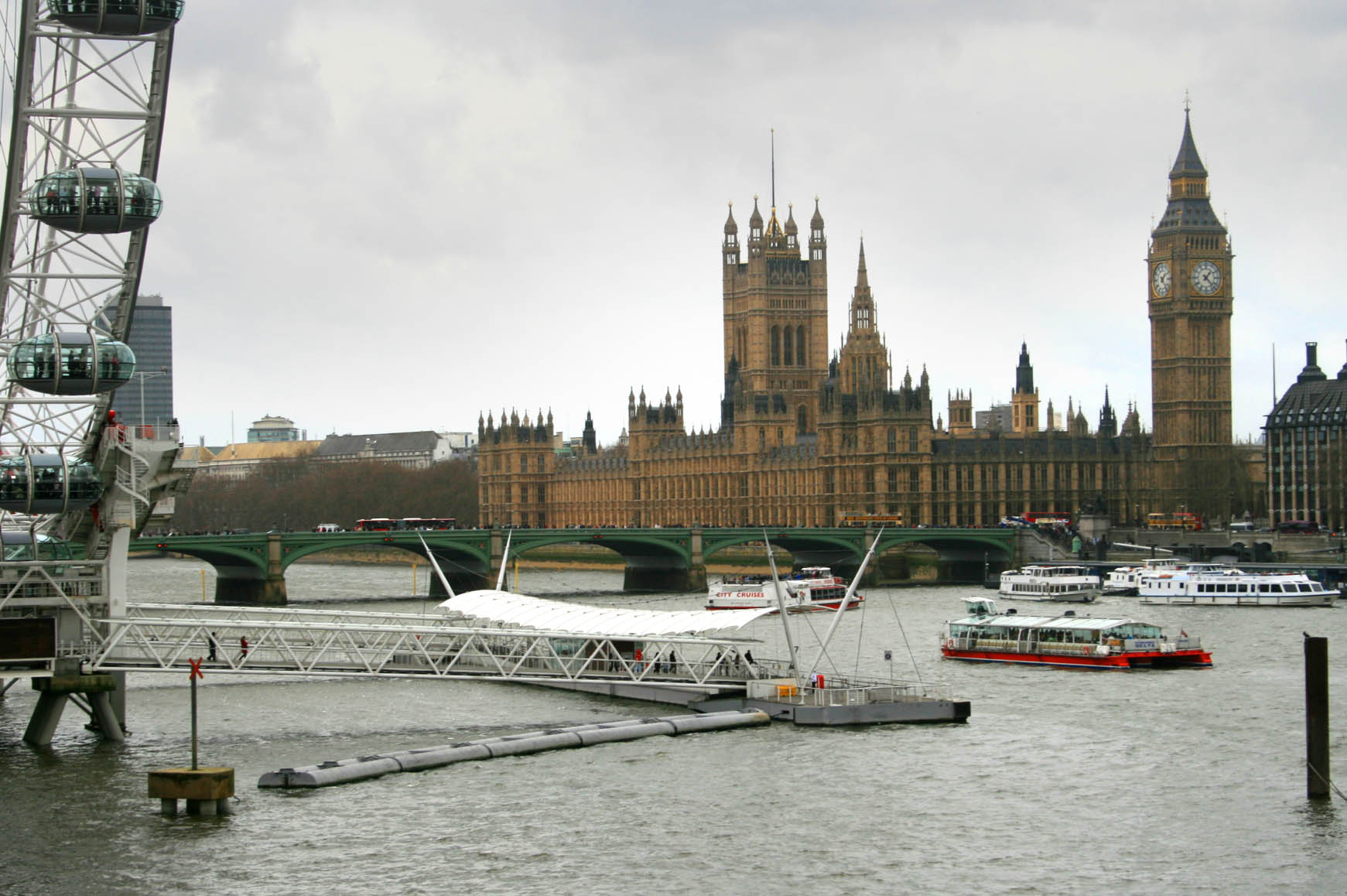
River traffic around Waterloo Pier in 2008

The Cross-River Partnership, a consortium of local authorities, private sector organisations and voluntary bodies, recommended the creation of a public body to co-ordinate and promote river services. This agency, provisionally titled the Thames Piers Agency, would integrate boat services into other modes of public transport, take control of Thames piers from the Port of London Authority, and commission the construction of new piers.

The result was the formation in 1999 of London River Services (LRS), a wholly owned subsidiary of Transport for London.

Mayor Ken Livingstone's Transport Strategy for London 2005 stated that: "The safe use of the Thames for passenger and freight services should be developed. Passenger services will be encouraged, particularly services that relate to its cultural and architectural excellence and tourism. Use of London's other navigable waterways for freight, consistent with their roles for leisure use and as ecosystems, will be encouraged."

=== 21st century ===
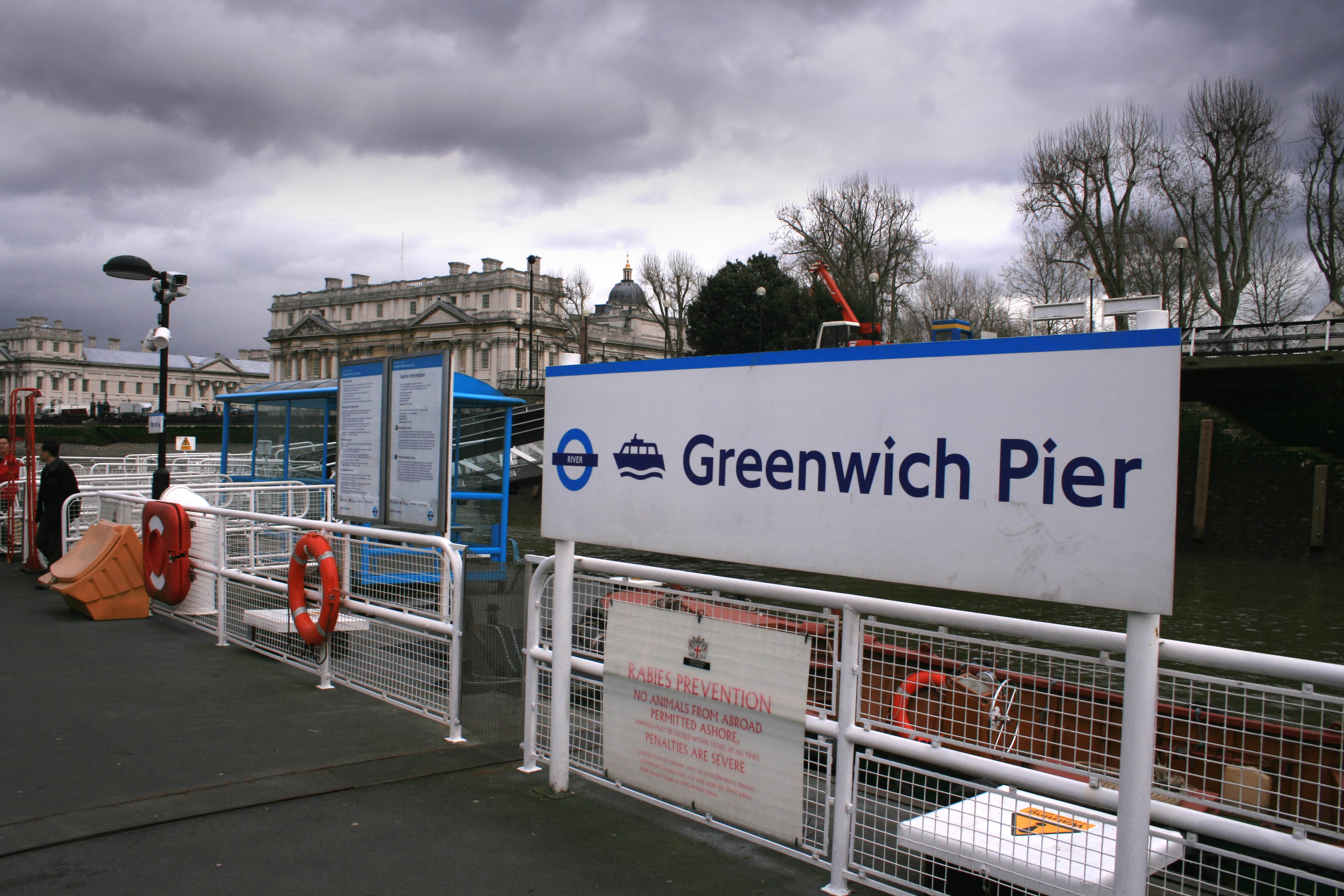
Greenwich Pier with TfL branding

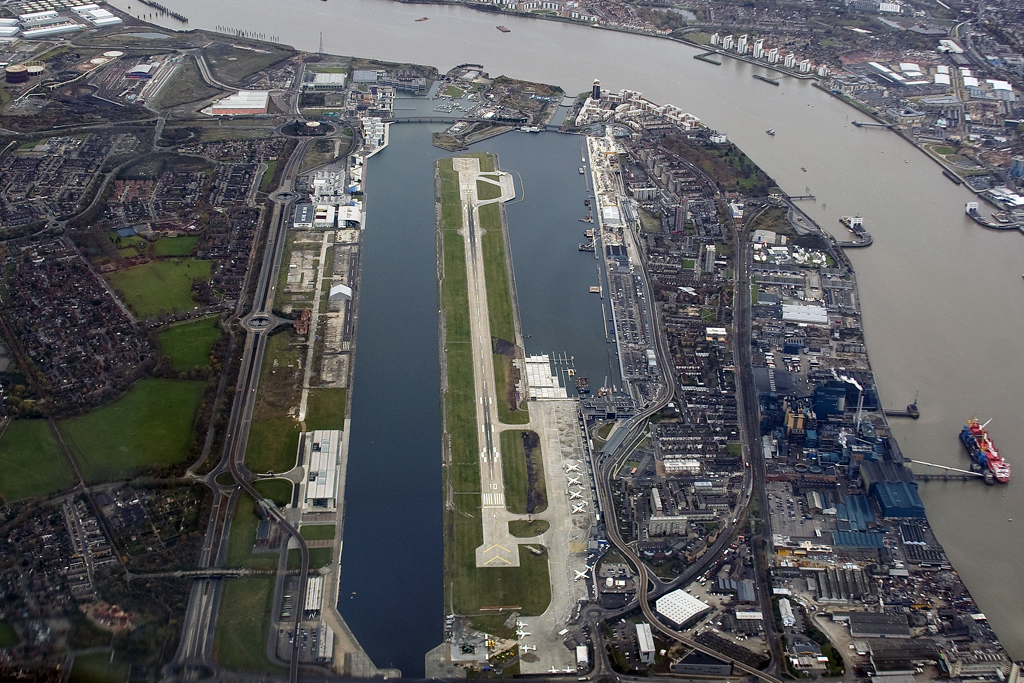
London City Airport in the Royal Docks, next to the Thames

Today, LRS is responsible for integrating river transport with the rest of the public transport network, such as the Tube and buses. It promotes boat services under the London River Services brand, issuing timetables and river maps.

LRS is also responsible for directly managing eight piers on the river, and invested in LRS-branded signage and passenger information.

LRS supports the Thames Clippers commuter service financially and increased the peak service frequency to a boat every 15 minutes. In April 2009 the signing of a "River Concordat" by London's pier owners, boat operators, borough councils and Transport for London was announced, committing the various parties to improving ticketing, piers and passenger information, and to closer integration into the transport network.

London River Services is not responsible for maintaining the river itself; the Port of London Authority takes care of river traffic control, security, navigational safety (including buoys, beacons, bridge lights and channel surveys), and the RNLI operates Thames lifeboat services.

== Branding ==
The public presentation of London River Services is visually associated with existing TfL design standards, using identical graphic design elements to those used on London Underground publicity, signage and other elements, drawing on the design heritage of Frank Pick.

The London River Services brand is a sub-brand of TfL which uses the familiar Tube roundel, originally devised for London Underground and now established as the corporate branding for all TfL services. The River Services roundel is a dark blue (Pantone 072) bar on pale blue (Pantone 299) circle.

The corporate signage, stationery and literature of TfL services, including LRS, use the New Johnston typeface.

LRS publishes diagrammatic river maps in the style of Harry Beck's iconic Tube map. Tube maps published by TfL since 2000 denote river interchange stations with a boat symbol.

== Services ==
The service patterns advertised by TfL can vary according to season. They are divided into three main types:

=== River Bus commuter services ===
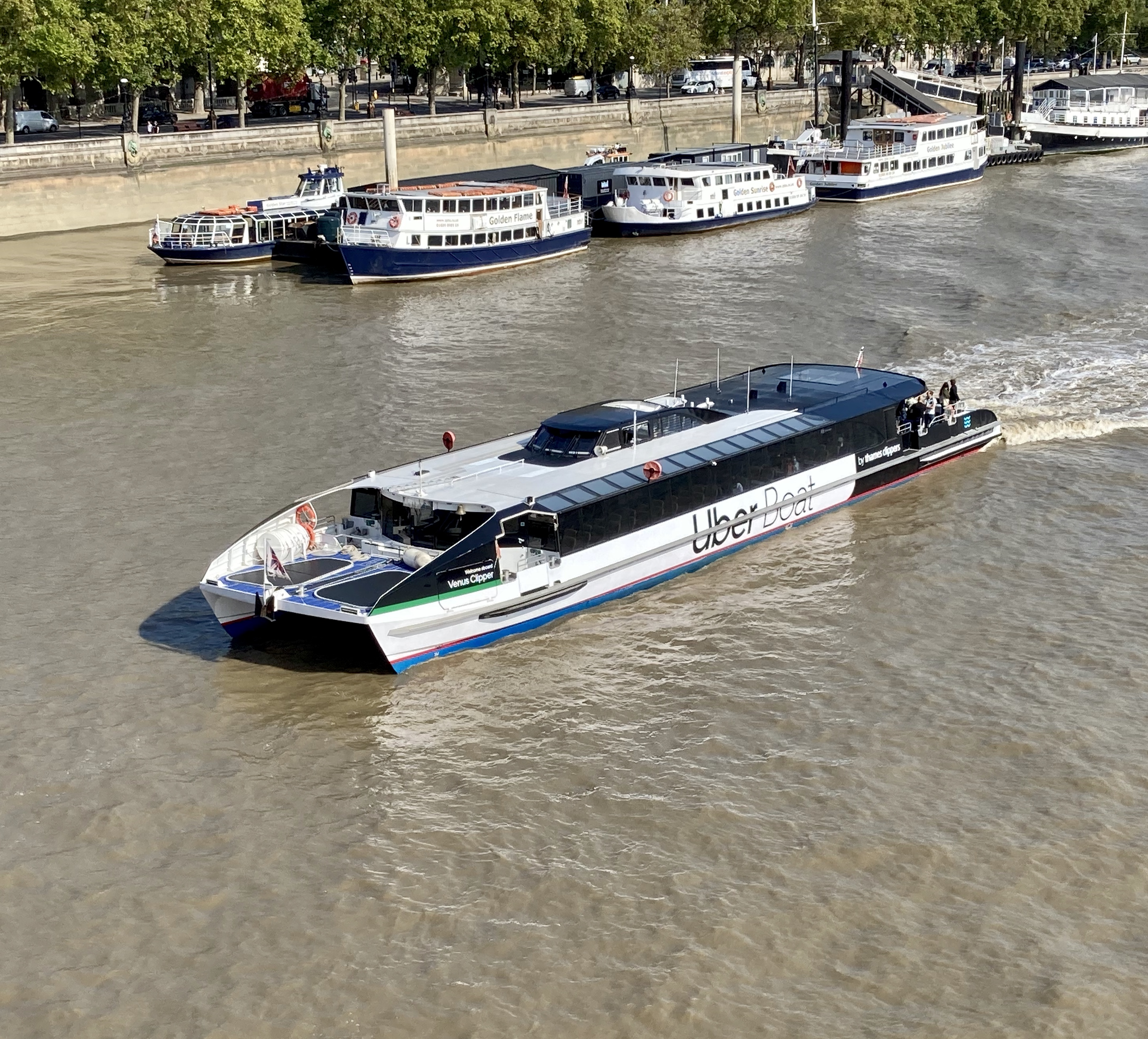
A commuter boat operated by Uber Boat by Thames Clippers on the River Thames

Numbered River Bus services (abbreviated to RB) run to a timetable through the day with more frequent services during peak rush hour times. All River Bus services run 7 days a week. Many operators offer discounted fares to Travelcard holders. The main lines of operation are:

Service	Route	Notes
RB1	Battersea Power Station Pier ↔ Barking Riverside Pier	
RB6	Putney Pier ↔ Barking Riverside Pier	

The catamaran-hulled vessels have on-board coffee bars, airline-style seating, are wheelchair-accessible and have bicycle racks.

=== Ferry services ===
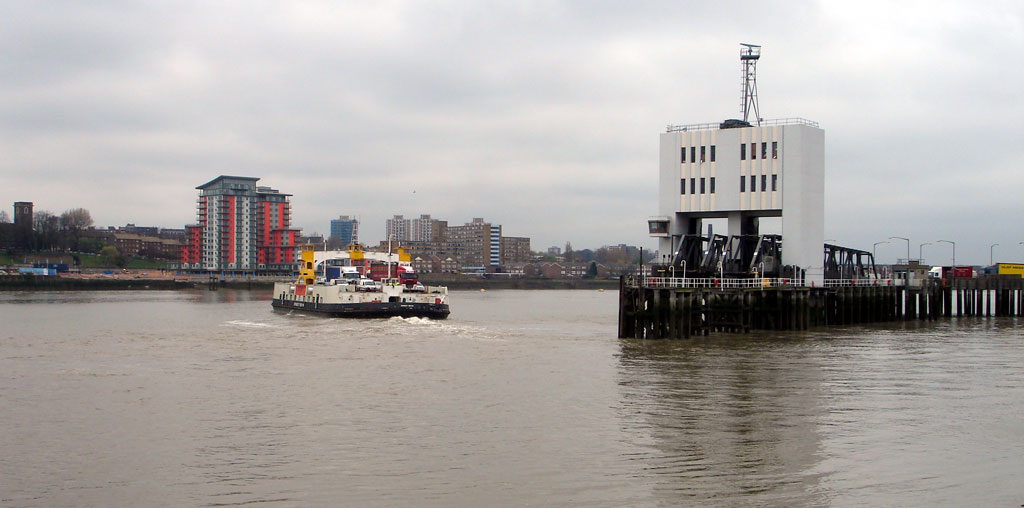
The Woolwich vehicle & passenger ferry

In central London, the River Thames is narrow enough to allow it to be crossed by many bridges; further downstream however, the river widens and there are fewer bridge crossings. Two ferry services are still in operation:

Service	Route	Notes
RB4 Canary Wharf – Rotherhithe Ferry	Canary Wharf Pier ↔ Rotherhithe Pier	Serves the DoubleTree by Hilton hotel in Rotherhithe. Boats operate roughly every 10 minutes, and can be used both by guests of the hotel as well as by passengers not staying at the hotel.
Woolwich Ferry	Woolwich ↔ North Woolwich	Free ferry service for vehicles and foot passengers, close to King George V DLR station. For vehicles, the service links the London ring roads, the North and South Circular roads, at their eastern ends.

Two other ferry services operate upstream in west London: Hammerton's Ferry and the Hampton Ferry. These services are independent of London River Services as they do not serve LRS-managed piers.

=== Leisure services ===
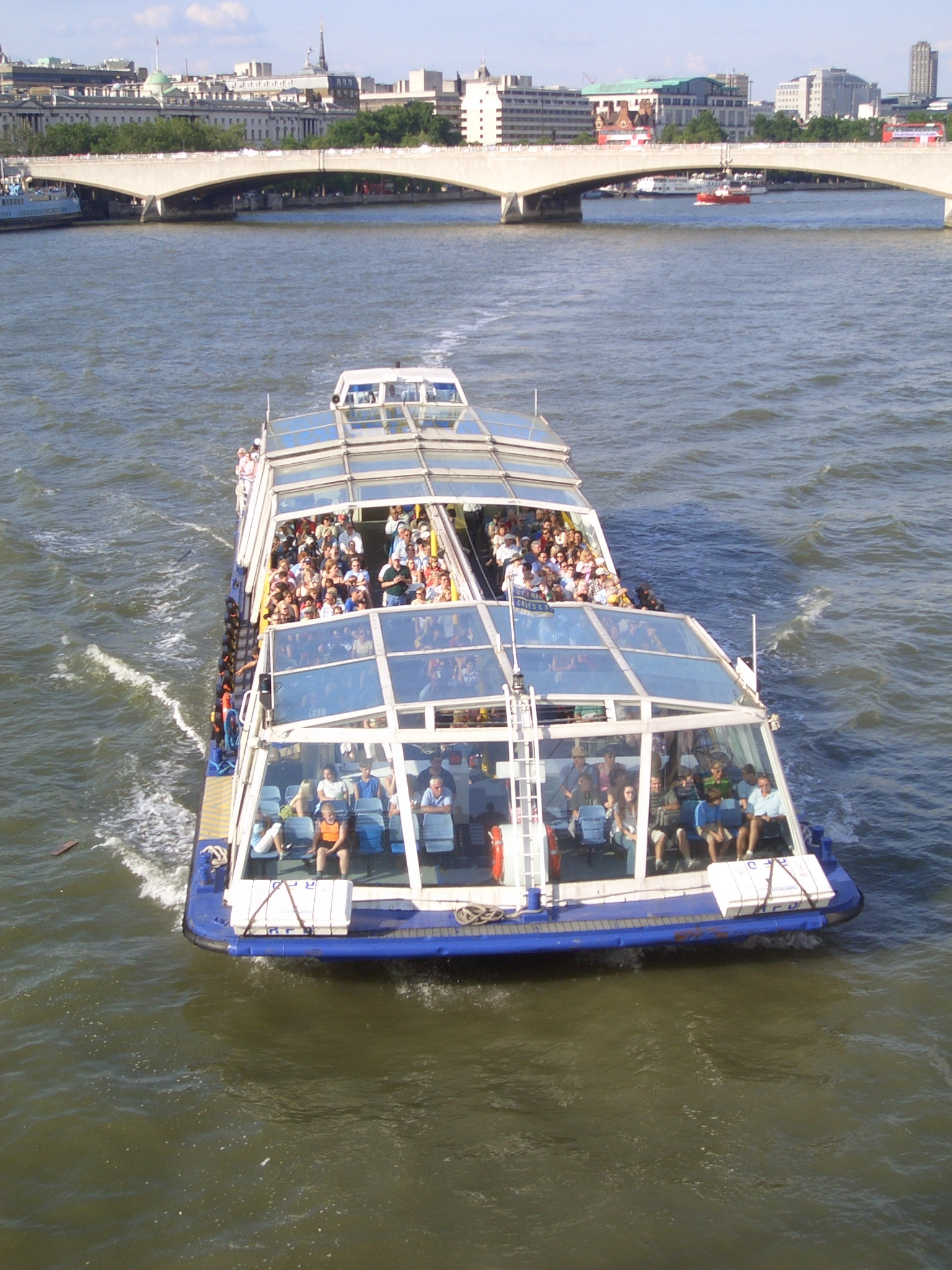
A tourist boat operated by Bateaux London Catamaran Cruisers on the River Thames

Leisure boats are aimed mainly at the tourist market; as they do not usually provide rush hour services, they are not normally suitable for commuting. Some boat companies run regular scheduled services, others may run twice daily, only on certain days of the week, or only during certain months of the year. Boats may also be chartered for private hire. Destinations are often tourist attractions such as the Tate Galleries or Hampton Court Palace.

== Operators ==
Scheduled tourist and commuter services on the river are operated by a number of private companies, including:

Operator	Services
London Eye River Cruise	Tourist / sightseeing
Waverley Excursions	Tourist / sightseeing
Uber Boat by Thames Clippers	Commuter service
Thames River Sightseeing	Tourist / sightseeing
Westminster Passenger Services Association (Thames River Boats)	Tourist / sightseeing

== Piers ==
Map of Thames piers in London = TfL piers = Other operators' piers

London River Services lists 24 piers on the River Thames in its publications, of which eight are managed directly by LRS.

=== Millennium Piers ===
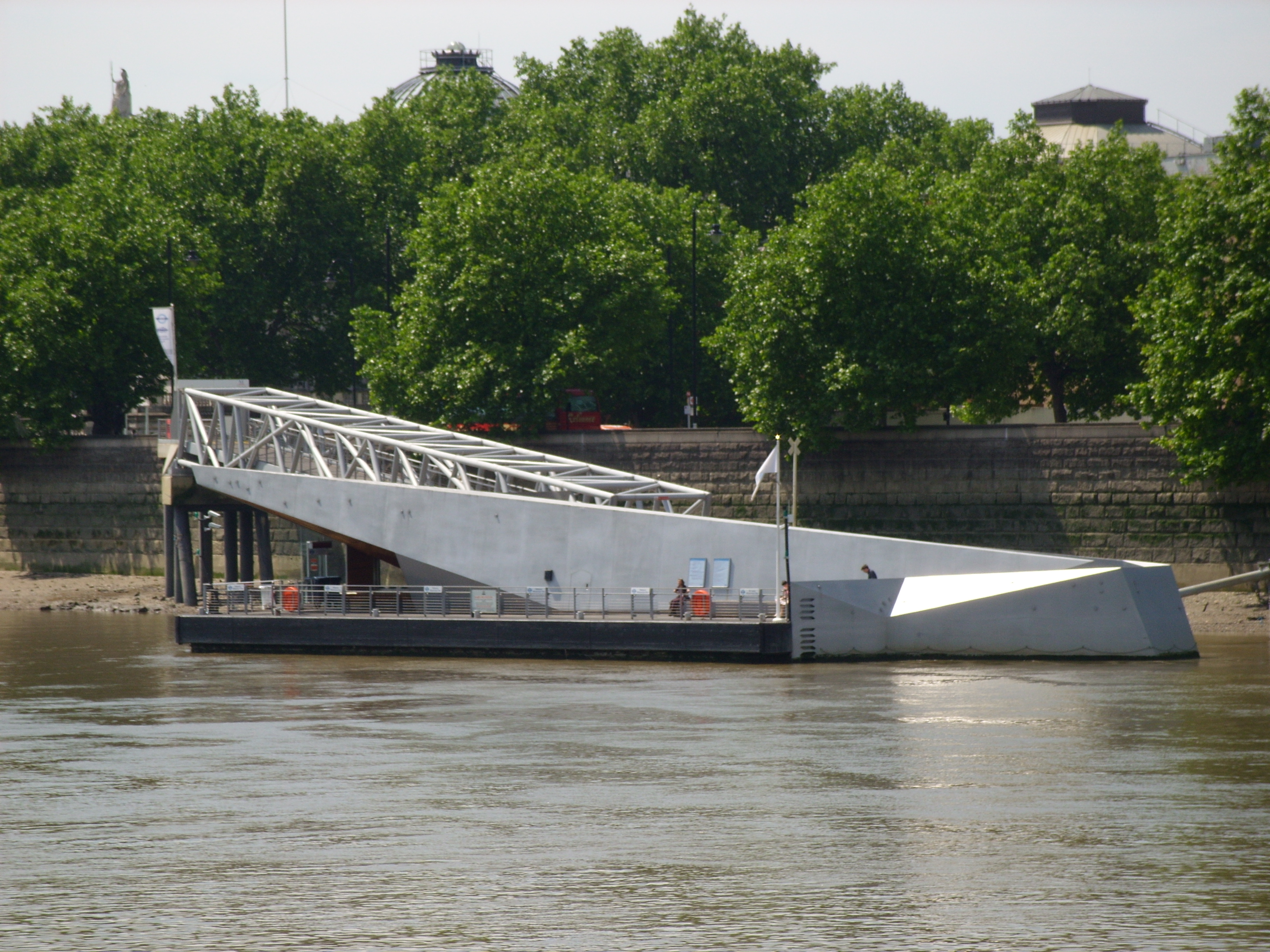
Millbank Millennium Pier – architect: Steve Chilton

In 2000, five new piers were opened with funding from the Millennium Commission under its Thames 2000 project, with a grant of £7,177,000:

- Tower Millennium Pier
- Blackfriars Millennium Pier
- London Eye Pier
- Westminster Millennium Pier
- Millbank Millennium Pier

The new piers were provided to improve previously neglected travel connections on the Thames and promote the river as an alternative means of public transport.

=== List of piers ===
Scheduled tourist and commuter services use the following piers, although no single service serves all the piers listed. The piers are listed in order going downstream:

#	Pier	Services	Nearest tube/train	Destinations	Notes
1	Hampton Court Pier		Hampton Court	Hampton Court Palace	Managed by Turk Launches Ltd.
2	Hampton Court Landing Stage	Westminster Passenger Services Association (Thames River Boats)	Hampton Court	Richmond upon Thames	Owned & Operated by Thames River Boats incorporating Colliers Launches & Maynard Launches.
3	Kingston (Town End Pier)			Kingston upon Thames	Managed by Turk Launches Ltd. Head office at this pier
4	Kingston (Turks Pier)		Kingston	Kingston upon Thames	Managed by Turk Launches Ltd.
5	Hammertons Landing Stage		Richmond	Richmond upon Thames; Ham House	Hammerton's Ferry,
6	Richmond Landing Stage	Westminster Passenger Services Association (Thames River Boats)	Richmond	Richmond upon Thames	Owned & Operated by Thames River Boats incorporating Colliers Launches & Maynard Launches.
7	Richmond (St Helena) Pier		Richmond	Richmond upon Thames	Managed operated by Turk Launches Ltd.
8	Kew Pier	Westminster Passenger Services Association (Thames River Boats)	Kew Gardens; Kew Bridge	Kew Gardens; London Museum of Water & Steam	Owned & Operated by Thames River Boats incorporating Colliers Launches & Maynard Launches.
9	Putney Pier	Thames Clippers RB6	Putney Bridge; Putney	Fulham; Putney	Managed by Livett's Launches
10	Wandsworth Riverside Quarter Pier	Thames Clippers RB6	Wandsworth Town	Wandsworth	
11	St Mary's Wandsworth Pier	Thames Clippers RB6	Imperial Wharf	Chelsea Harbour, Sands End	
12	Cadogan Pier	Thames Clippers RB6		Chelsea	Intermittent service times
13	Battersea Power Station Pier	Thames Clippers RB1 and RB6	Battersea Power Station	Battersea Power Station	
14	Vauxhall (St George Wharf) Pier	Thames Clippers RB1 and RB6	Vauxhall; Vauxhall		Managed by Consort
15	Millbank Millennium Pier	Thames Clippers RB1 and RB6	Pimlico	Tate Britain art gallery	Managed by TfL; Intermittent service times
16	Westminster Pier	City Cruises; Thames Clippers RB1 and RB6; Westminster Passenger Services Association (Thames River Boats); Thames River Sightseeing	Westminster	Palace of Westminster; Westminster Abbey	Managed by TfL
17	London Eye (Waterloo) Pier (Waterloo Millennium Pier)	Thames Clippers RB1 and RB6	Waterloo; Waterloo East	London Eye; South Bank arts precinct	Managed by London Eye; Intermittent service times
18	Embankment Pier	Thames Clippers RB1 and RB6; Thames River Sightseeing	Embankment; Charing Cross	London Eye; South Bank arts precinct Trafalgar Square	Managed by TfL
19	Festival Pier	Thames River Sightseeing	Embankment; Waterloo	London Eye; South Bank arts precinct	Managed by TfL
20	Savoy Pier		Embankment; Charing Cross	Savoy Hotel; Covent Garden	
21	Tower Lifeboat Station				Only for use by RNLI lifeboats; not open to the public.
22	Blackfriars Pier	Thames Clippers RB1 and RB6	Blackfriars	St Paul's Cathedral; Tate Modern art gallery	Managed by TfL; Intermittent service times
23	Bankside Pier	Thames Clippers RB1 and RB6; Thames River Sightseeing	Blackfriars	Shakespeare's Globe; Tate Modern art gallery	Managed by TfL
24	London Bridge City Pier	Thames Clippers RB1 and RB6	London Bridge	HMS Belfast; Southwark Cathedral	
25	Tower Pier	Thames Clippers RB1 and RB6	Tower Hill; Tower Gateway; Fenchurch Street	Tower of London; Tower Bridge	Managed by TfL
26	Tower Bridge Quay	Thames River Sightseeing	Tower Hill; Tower Gateway	St Katharine Docks; Tower of London; Tower Bridge	
27	Rotherhithe Pier	Thames Clippers RB1, RB4 and RB6	–	Rotherhithe	Selected RB1 and RB6 services stop here
28	Canary Wharf Pier	Thames Clippers RB1, RB4 and RB6	Canary Wharf; Canary Wharf; Canary Wharf	Canary Wharf financial district	
29	Greenland (Surrey Quays) Pier	Thames Clippers RB1 and RB6	Surrey Quays	Greenland Dock	
30	Masthouse Terrace Pier	Thames Clippers RB1 and RB6	Island Gardens	Isle of Dogs	
31	Greenwich Pier	City Cruises; Thames Clippers RB1 and RB6; Thames River Sightseeing; Viscount Cruises (Campion Launches)	Cutty Sark; Greenwich	Greenwich; Cutty Sark; National Maritime Museum	Managed by TfL
32	North Greenwich Pier (QEII Pier)	Thames Clippers RB1 and RB6	North Greenwich	The O2 Arena	
33	Barrier Gardens Pier	Thames River Sightseeing (Pre-Booking Required)	Woolwich Dockyard	Thames Barrier	Summer only
34	Royal Wharf Pier	Thames Clippers RB1 and RB6	Pontoon Dock; West Silvertown	Royal Wharf	Opened 2019; Limited RB6 services stop here
35	Woolwich (Royal Arsenal) Pier	Thames Clippers RB1 and RB6; Woolwich Ferry	Woolwich Dockyard; Woolwich Arsenal	Woolwich; South Circular	Limited RB6 services stop here
36	North Woolwich Pier	Woolwich Ferry	King George V	Woolwich; North Circular; London City Airport	
37	Barking Riverside Pier	Thames Clippers RB1 and RB6	Barking Riverside	Barking Riverside	Opened April 2022; Limited RB6 services stop here
38	Erith Pier		Erith		Originally opened August 1842 Longest pier in London[29]

== Fares and ticketing ==
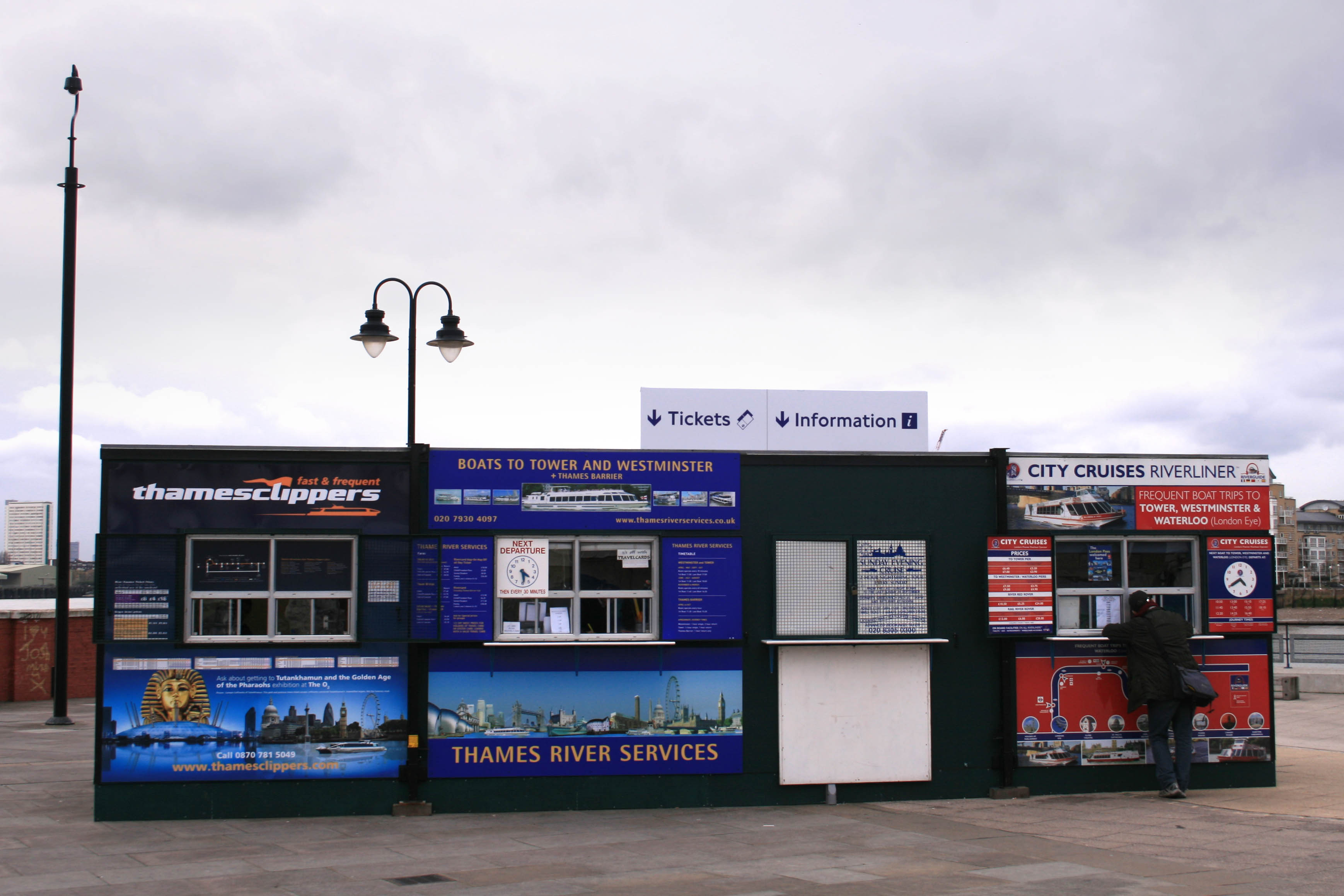
Different ticket kiosks for each boat operator

Unlike the underground and bus networks, boat operators have their own separate ticketing arrangements and charge separate fares which are generally higher than corresponding journeys by tube or bus. The only exception is the Woolwich Ferry, which is free of charge.

Oyster card is valid on most Thames Clipper services for single fares. Additionally, certain travel cards, such as the Travelcard (when loaded onto an Oyster card), can provide discounted fares on Thames Clippers. Tourists can also purchase Uber Boat by Thames Clippers tickets on the Uber app.

Ticket sales at piers are managed independently by the operators, and tickets are sold at separate kiosks with no facility for cross-ticketing. (see image) Many piers have a line of several sales desks, each owned by a different boat firm. Single tickets can often be bought on board the boat, but this is down to individual operator arrangements.

Some operators offer their own season tickets and carnets of single tickets. Thames Clipper, for example, offer a one-day River Roamer ticket which allows multiple journeys within off-peak hours.

All London piers are accessible (to wheelchair users) except for Cadogan Pier and London Bridge City Pier.

== See also ==
- Crossrail
- Cycling in London
- Docklands Light Railway
- East London Transit
- London Overground
- Tramlink
- Transport on the Regent's Canal
