= Greenland (Surrey Quays) Pier =

Pier on the River Thames

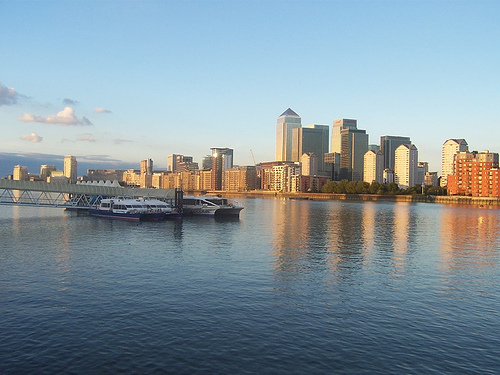
- Type: River bus services
- Location: River Thames, London,
- Coordinates: 51.4947°N 0.0319°W
- Owner: London River Services
- Operator: Uber Boat by Thames Clippers

History
- Location within London Borough of Southwark

Greenland (Surrey Quays) Pier is a pier on the River Thames in London, United Kingdom. It is situated at the eastern end of Greenland Dock in the London Borough of Southwark, and is a stop on the Uber Boat by Thames Clippers commuter catamaran service.

== Services ==
Greenland (Surrey Quays) Pier is a stop on the Thames commuter catamaran service run by Uber Boat by Thames Clippers from Embankment Pier, via Tower Millennium Pier, Canary Wharf Pier and on to Greenwich Pier, the North Greenwich Pier, Royal Wharf Pier, Woolwich (Royal Arsenal) Pier and Barking Riverside Pier.

== Ownership ==
Threats of closure due to maintenance issues have been a recurrent problem in recent years. Despite a pledge to revamp the pier for the London 2012 Olympics, Southwark Council was unable to secure the investment required and served notice of the pier's closure on 16 March 2012. Subsequent negotiations between Thames Clippers and Southwark Council resulted in its purchase by Thames Clippers, who will now take responsibility for its upkeep.

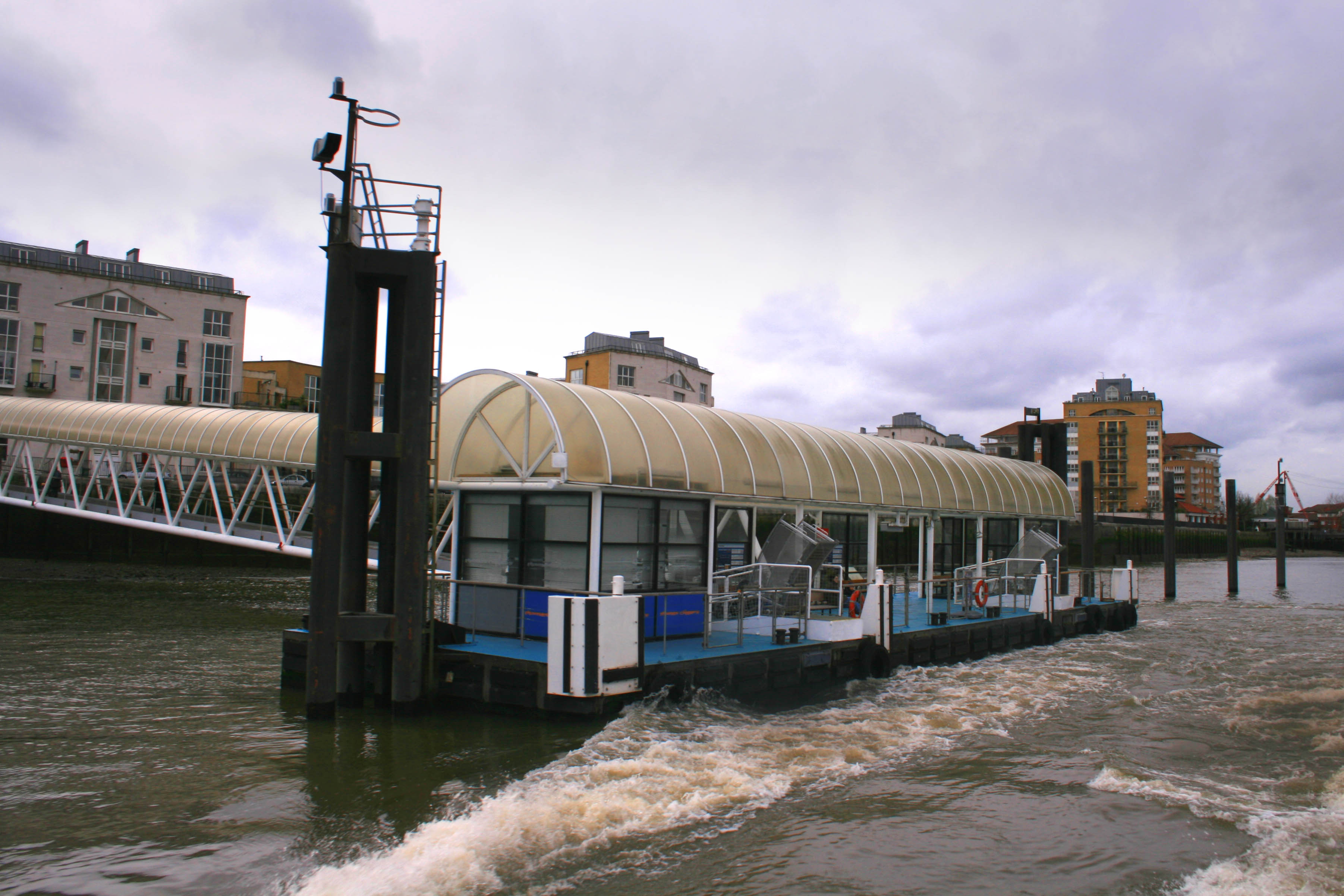
View from a departing catamaran

== Lines ==
Preceding station	London River Services	Following station
Rotherhithe Pier towards Battersea Power Station Pier	RB1	Masthouse Terrace Pier towards Barking Riverside Pier
Rotherhithe Pier towards Putney Pier	RB6	Masthouse Terrace Pier towards Barking Riverside Pier
