= Canary Wharf Pier =

Pier on the River Thames in London, England

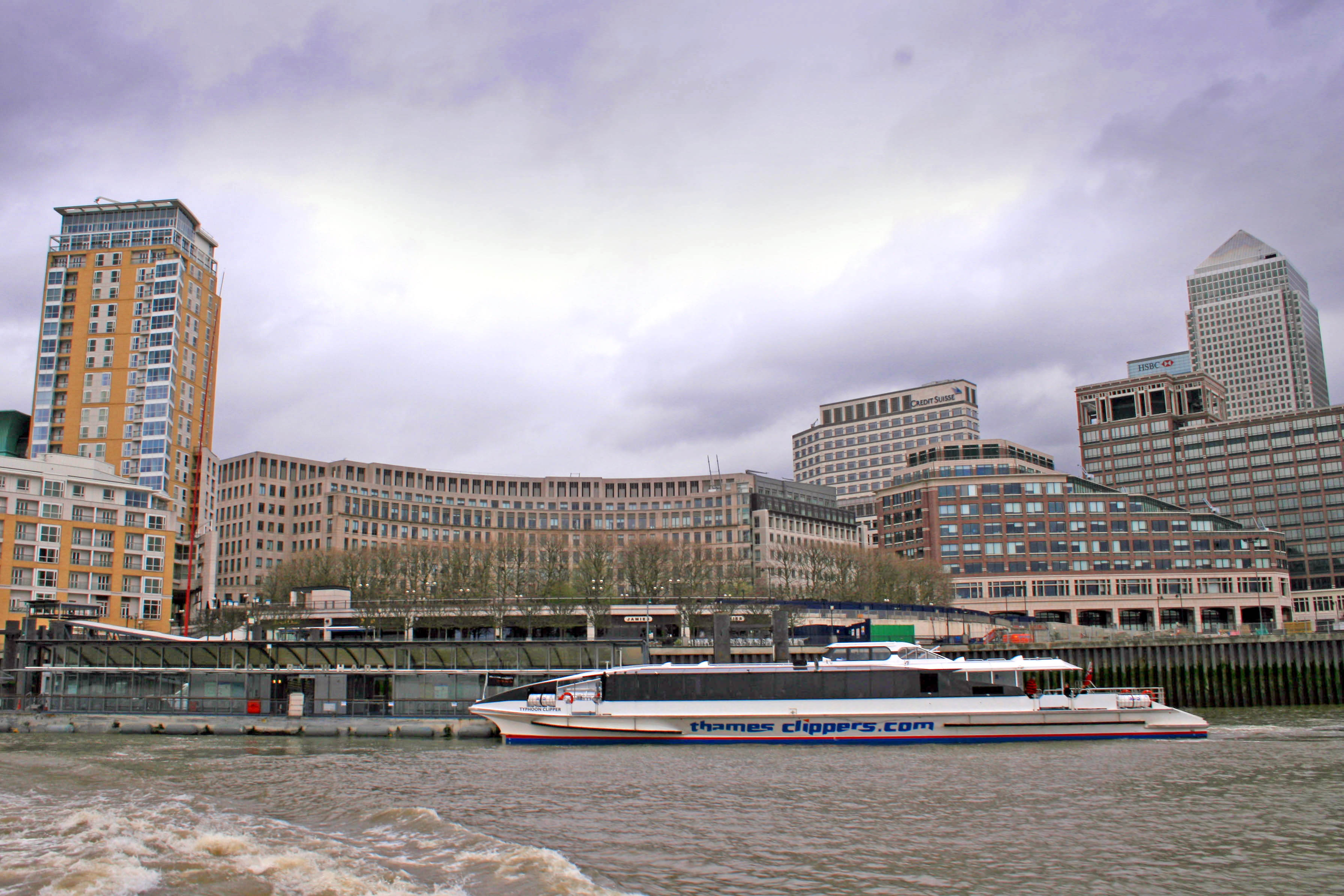
- A Thames Clipper catamaran calls at Canary Wharf Pier
- Type: River bus and tourist/leisure services
- Location: Canary Wharf
- Coordinates: 51°30′18.66″N 0°1′43.29″W
- Owner: Canary Wharf Group
- Operator: Uber Boat by Thames Clippers

History
- Location within London Borough of Tower Hamlets

Canary Wharf is a pier on the River Thames in Canary Wharf, London. It is located next to Westferry Circus.

== Services ==
It is served by two commuter oriented services, both operated by Uber Boat by Thames Clippers under licence from London River Services. The main commuter service from central London or Woolwich calls at Canary Wharf Pier on a regular basis. The Canary Wharf - Rotherhithe Ferry, also operated by Uber Boat by Thames Clippers, links Canary Wharf Pier with Rotherhithe Pier at the DoubleTree by Hilton hotel in Rotherhithe. The service uses smaller boats than the commuter service but runs at a higher frequency of roughly every 10 minutes. The ferry can be used both by guests of the hotel as well as by passengers not staying at the hotel.

Since 2013 boats have run direct as far as Putney (the RB6 service), taking roughly one hour. The evening direct service departs at 1750. Later services to Putney require a five-minute change at Embankment, leaving Canary Wharf at 17:58, 18:18, 18:58, 19:18 and 19:58.

Private charter entertainment boats also use Canary Wharf Pier.

== Connections ==
- London Buses routes 135; 277; D3; D7; D8.
- Westferry DLR station
- West India Quay DLR station
- Canary Wharf railway station
- Canary Wharf DLR station
- Canary Wharf tube station

== Lines ==
| Preceding station | London River Services | Following station |
|---|---|---|
| Tower Millennium Pier towards Battersea Power Station Pier | RB1 | Rotherhithe Pier towards Barking Riverside Pier |
| Terminus | RB4 | Rotherhithe Pier Terminus |
| Tower Millennium Pier towards Putney Pier | RB6 | Rotherhithe Pier towards Barking Riverside Pier |
