= Chelsea Harbour =

Mixed-use development in London, England

Coordinates: 51.4753°N 0.1811°W

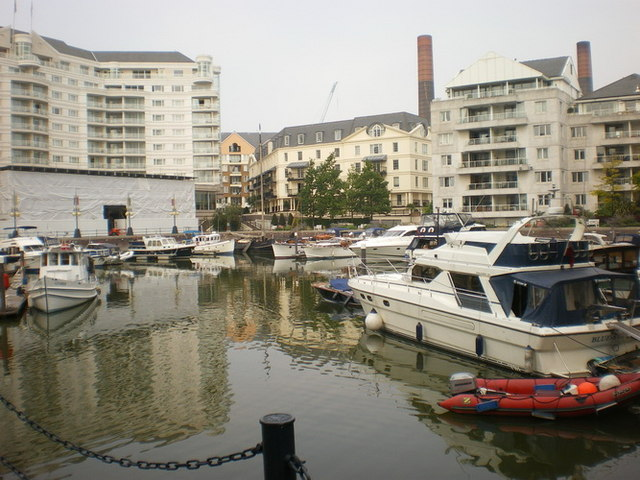

- Location within Greater London
- OS grid reference: TQ265765
- London borough: Hammersmith & Fulham
- Ceremonial county: Greater London
- Region: London
- Country: England
- Sovereign state: United Kingdom
- Post town: LONDON
- Postcode district: SW10
- Dialling code: 020
- Police: Metropolitan
- Fire: London
- Ambulance: London
- London Assembly: West Central

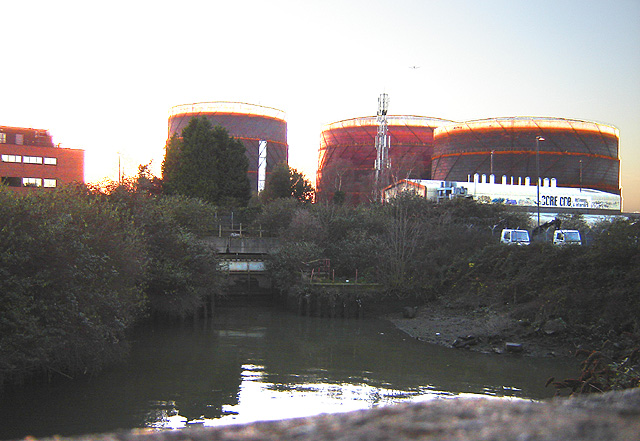
Chelsea Creek in 2006 with outlook onto Fulham gas holders

Chelsea Harbour is a mixed-use development in West London, situated in its Sands End area, along Chelsea Creek, the historic southeastern boundary of the London Borough of Hammersmith and Fulham with the southwestern boundary of the Royal Borough of Kensington and Chelsea, and opposite the site of the old Lots Road Power Station in Chelsea. The development consists of luxury apartments, the Chelsea Harbour Marina and the Chelsea Harbour Design Centre and a hotel, 'the Chelsea Harbour Hotel'.

== History ==
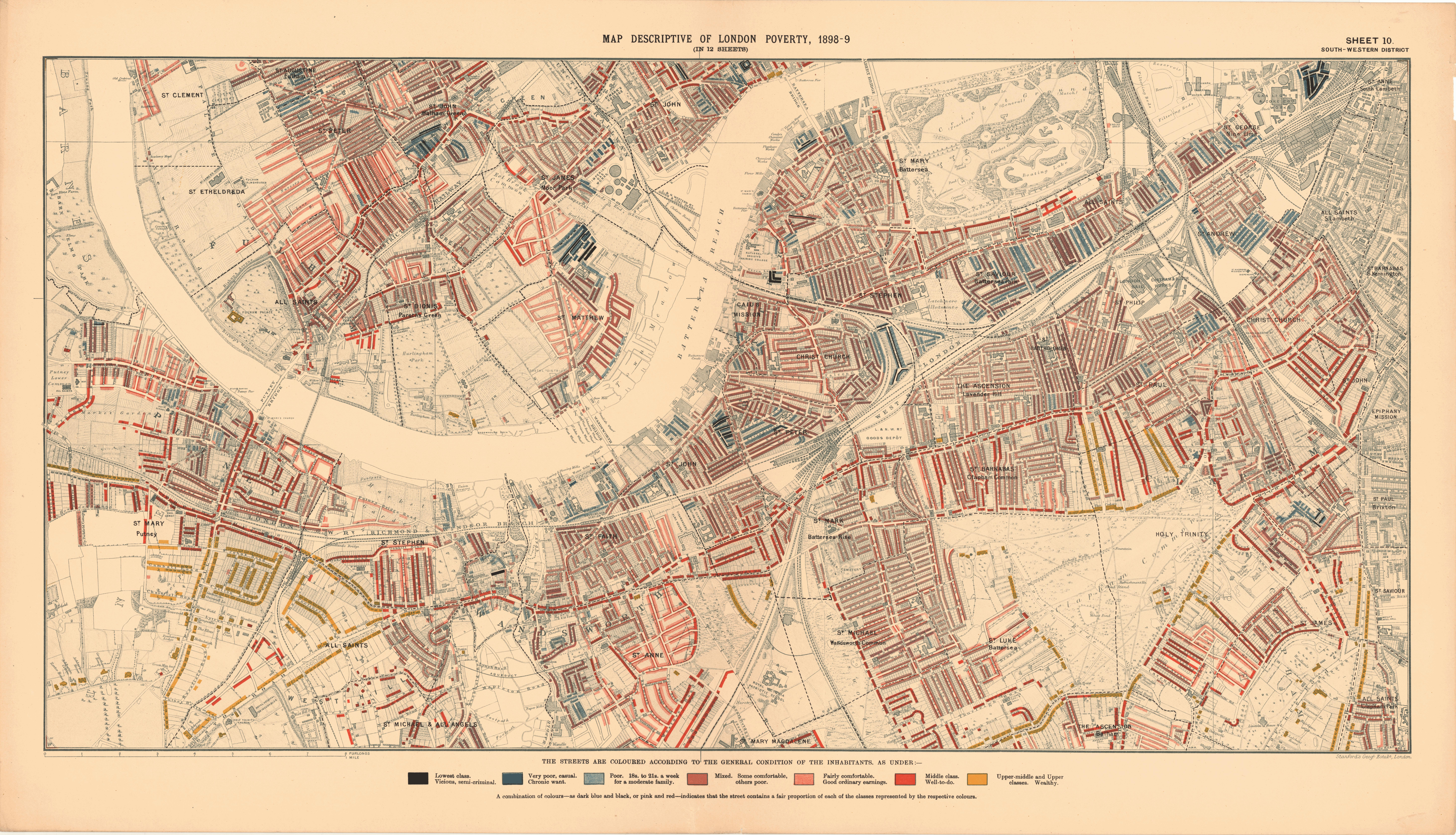
1898 map showing Fulham Gas Works

"Chelsea Harbour" stands on land that was once the 28-acre estate of Sandford Manor House. Among other occupants, it is reputed to have been the residence of Nell Gwyn. At the start of the 19th century, it was in decline and was bought by a gas company. Part of the land was used as a Victorian-era railway coaling dock on the River Thames. Latterly it had been a coal yard for predecessor companies of British Rail. The 20-acre site lies in a triangle bounded by the Thames and Counter's Creek to the south and east, and to the west by the West London Line (Overground Network and National Rail) on a viaduct. At the inception of the redevelopment, the Conservative-led Hammersmith and Fulham Council, having granted planning permission, approached the Boundary Commission to have it re-designated as part of the Royal Borough of Kensington and Chelsea. The Commission reported in 1992 proposing a shift of boundary to the middle of the West London Line rail tracks. In the event, the Royal Borough passed on the offer of Chelsea Harbour in the then Leader's following terms: The Royal Borough has completed its submissions to the Boundaries Commission. No suggestion that we should take Chelsea Harbour into this authority was among them. That will remain our position. (Nicholas Freeman)

== Regeneration ==
Chelsea Harbour was designed by architects Moxley Jenner & Partners, developed by Mansford, with Bovis Homes Group serving as project management consultants. It was the biggest single construction project in the United Kingdom for decades. The original design was for 16 buildings covering some 14 acres. Only 12 buildings were completed due to a downturn in the UK economy during the construction period.

=== Remediation ===
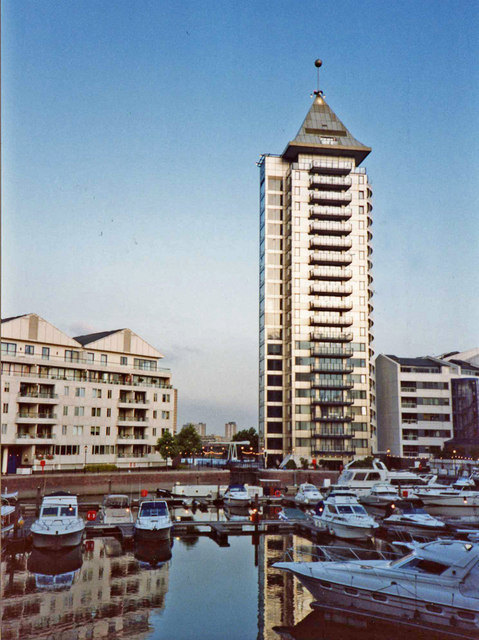
The Belvedere Tower and Marina

When planning permission was granted on 15 April 1986, the whole site, including the lock, was derelict. Both the Coal Dock and the lock had been infilled with contaminated materials, which had to be excavated and disposed of. The design required the contractor to reduce the size of the Dock by 1/3rd from the north end, to form the 75-berth Marina; and to re-construct the lock chamber, lock-gates, and cill. Work on-site began in early May 1986, and within twelve months the contractor had excavated the dock, constructed a new north wall, re-puddled the dock floor and renovated the lock. The site was equipped with 14 tower cranes, and had approximately 1500 personnel on-site during most of the build phase. In April 1987 a "commissioning Champagne Party" was held on two pontoons in the newly flooded "marina" for all the staff directly involved.

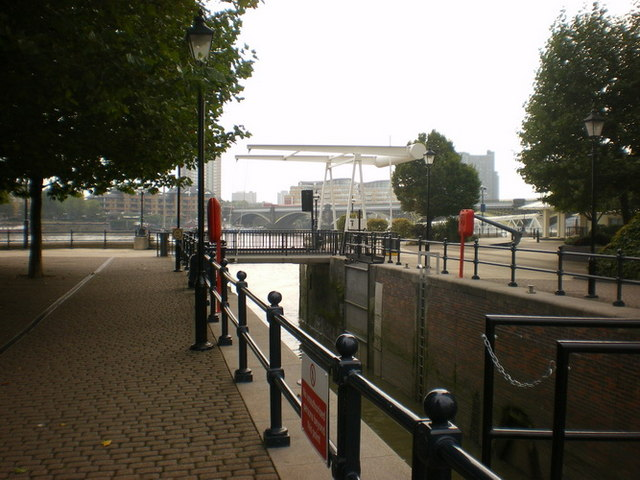
Lock, entrance into Chelsea Harbour

=== Achievements ===
Between April 1986 and April 1987, the construction team achieved the following:

- 2,000 piles had been sunk over 30 metres down to the London clay without problems, despite some being within two metres of both a London Underground main electrical supply cable and of a huge Victorian-built storm sewer.
- 250,000 cu. Metres of earth had been excavated and removed from the site;
- 55 acres of floor space were built, using 70,000 cubic metres of concrete and 8,000 tons of steel; one continuous concrete pour on Chelsea Garden Market's foundations totalled over 400 cu. Metres, with mixer trucks queueing-up for several hundred yards along Townmead Road. To ensure an uninterrupted cement supply for the concrete, 5,000 tons of cement were stockpiled in a hulk moored in the London Docks; and a concrete supply company was bought outright, to devote priority of supply to the project:
- the reinforced structural concrete frame of "Chelsea Crescent" (which contained 64 apartments as originally designed) was built in just eight weeks;
- three new bridges had been completed on-site, including the largest "thrust bore" tunnel in Europe (over Townmead Road), which was hydraulically jacked into position under an operating rail line in a single weekend;
- two buildings had been completed to "shell & core" status, and the interior spaces were already being occupied by the contractors of incoming tenants;
- a further eight buildings were under construction including "Chambers" and "Chelsea Garden Market";
- The 18-storey "Belvedere" tower was "topped-out" within six months of the start of work. The constructors managed to pour a new floor every four days, with pre-fabricated sub-sections of Rebar built on the ground using "go; no-go"Jigs, using a quick-curing high-strength concrete. Flat soffits with no "downstand beams", and pre-fabricated, steel, wheeled jack-up Forms were placed-, removed-, and re-positioned by the building's tower crane (with the aid of temporary-support platforms cantilevered off the side of the structure), erected in what would become one of the Belvedere's lift shafts.

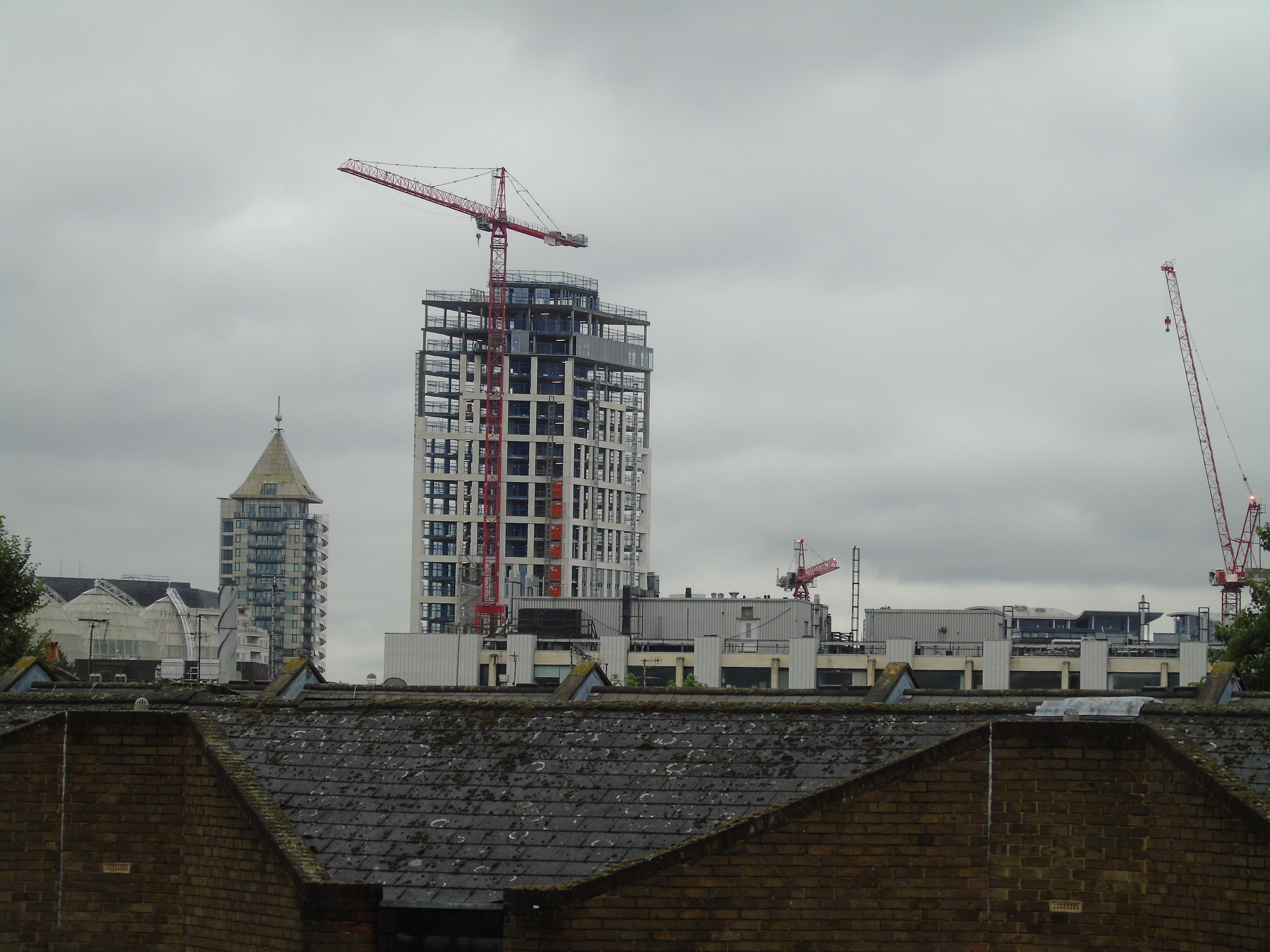
Construction work against Chelsea Harbour backdrop

=== Contracts ===
All the buildings – save for the hotel – were built as "shell & core" contracts, with tenants leasing their spaces from Chelsea Harbour Ltd. through their letting agents. Once each building was wind and weather-tight, and connected to the external services, tenants commissioned their own contractors for the internal finishings. Bovis project-managed the construction of the hotel from piling-level to roadway-level, and the remainder of the structure above-ground was completed by a client who had concluded a long lease with Chelsea Harbour Ltd. The civil and structural engineers for the project were Clarke Nicholls and Marcel of Hammersmith, London W6.

=== Marketing ===
Harrods Estates were asked to manage the residential aspects such as the sale and letting of properties. The 310 apartments were marketed with prices starting at around £2 million per property. The 261,000 sq ft of land has 24-hour security patrols, and residents have 24-hour porterage.

== Marina ==
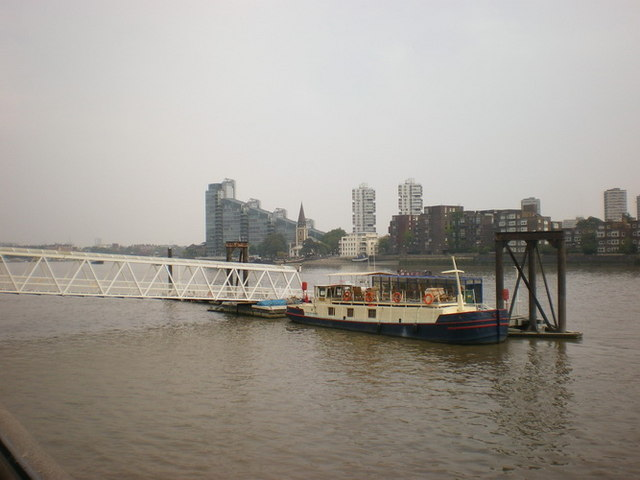
Chelsea Harbour Pier

The marina itself is not used commercially but accommodates luxury yachts and speedboats, and can be accessed from the Thames at high tide. The lock accessibility was indicated by a huge hollow sphere rising-&-dropping on a mast topping The "Belvedere", visible for a long way both upstream and down, and connected to a tide gauge by the lock gate giving into the Thames.

== Imperial Wharf and transport ==
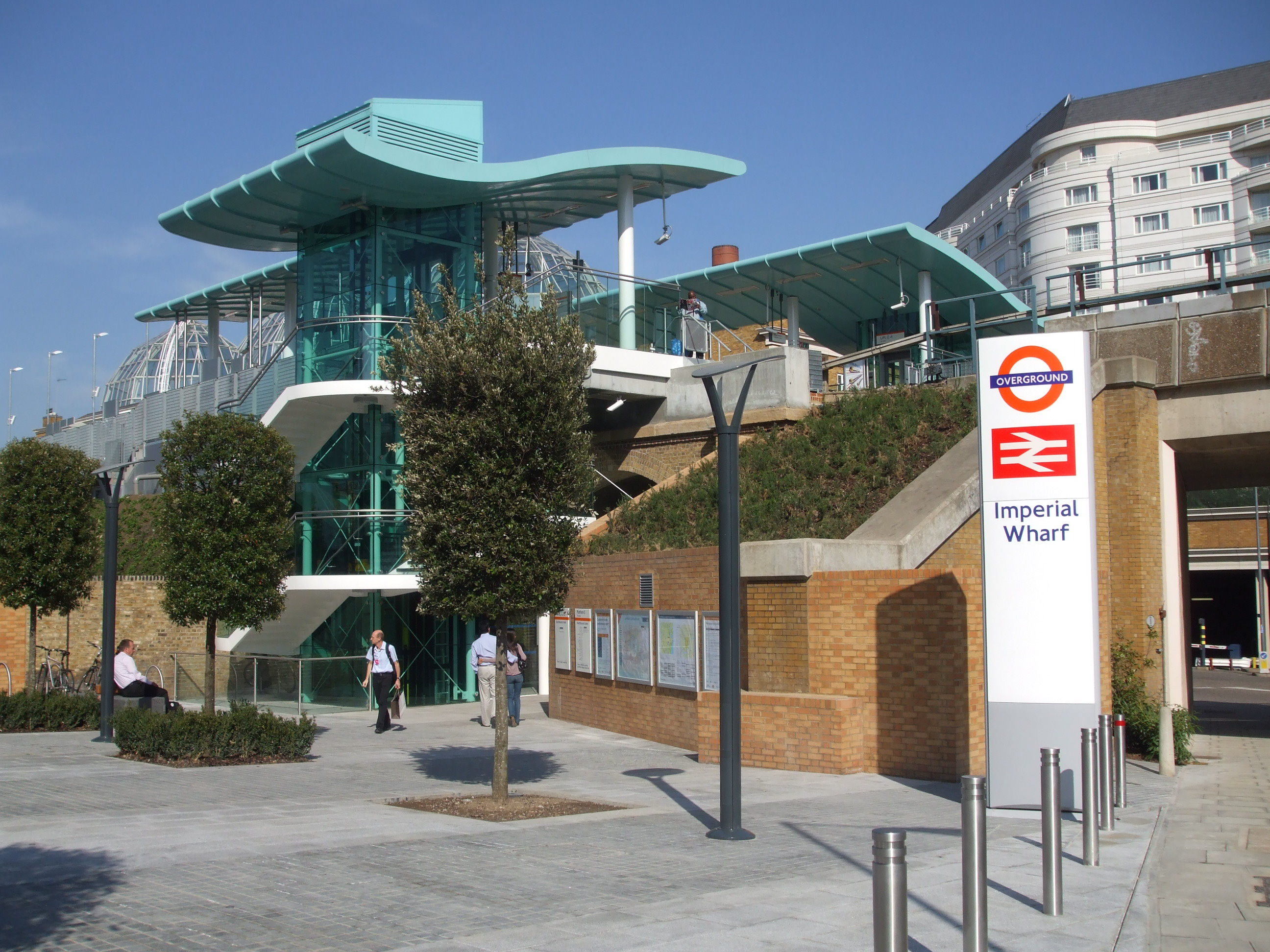
Imperial Wharf railway station western entrance 2

The immediate vicinity has been enhanced by Imperial Wharf, a riverside development by St George plc. Its name commemorates the Imperial Gas Light and Coke Company that established its operations here in 1824. The development is served by a London Overground station, Imperial Wharf, which opened on 27 September 2009, providing direct rail links with Clapham Junction and Willesden Junction, as well as Southern services to Milton Keynes Central and East Croydon. There are Transport for London bus services including route C3, linking Chelsea Harbour with Earl's Court, Fulham and Clapham Junction and route 424. There is also a direct railway track connecting Imperial Wharf directly to London Victoria Station that is currently not in service.

=== River bus services ===
River bus services are provided at peak hours by London River Services from Chelsea Harbour Pier and provide transport to Putney and Blackfriars Millennium Pier.

== Chelsea Design Centre ==
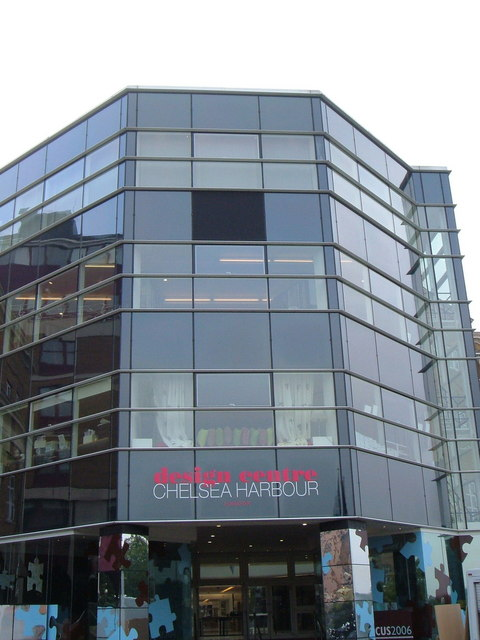
Chelsea Harbour Design Centre

The Chelsea Harbour Design Centre is home to over 70 showrooms, occupying nearly 66,000 sq ft gross internal space topped by three large glazed domes over a galleria. The offices are in two buildings known as "Harbour Yard" and "The Design Centre East".

== Notable residents ==
Chelsea Harbour is off the Lots and Townmead roads and has been home to some notable past and contemporary residents who have included:

- Joseph Addison (1672–1719), essayist, playwright lived at Sands End
- William De Morgan (1832–1917), potter, ceramicist, designer and novelist lived and worked nearby
- Michael Caine
- Robbie Williams
- Tom Stoppard
- Emmanuel Petit
- Sally Burton
- Sir Ralph Halpern

== Lots Road power station ==
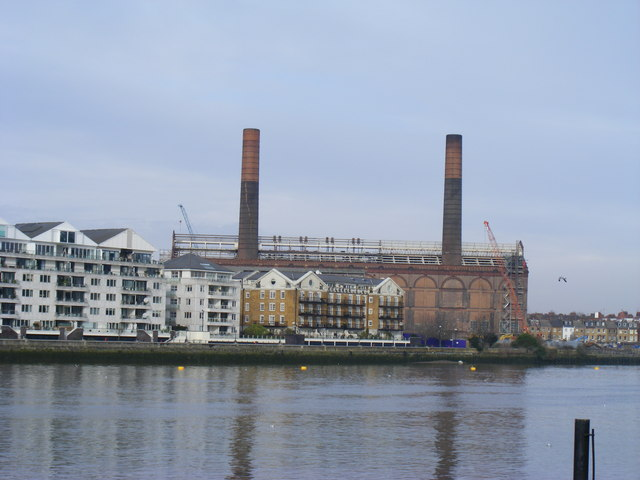
Chelsea Harbour against Lots Road Power Station, beyond the creek

A neighbouring, large-scale development called, "Chelsea Waterfront", planned by Terry Farrell has now been completed on the site of the former Lots Road power station.

== John Roque's 1746 Map ==
The extract below of John Rocque's Map of London, 1746 shows Fulham in the loop of the Thames, with Counter's Creek distinctly visible to the left, just below the 'elbow' in the river. Sands End and the future Chelsea Harbour area lies immediately to the left of the mouth of the tributary, which is called 'Chelsea Creek' at this juncture.

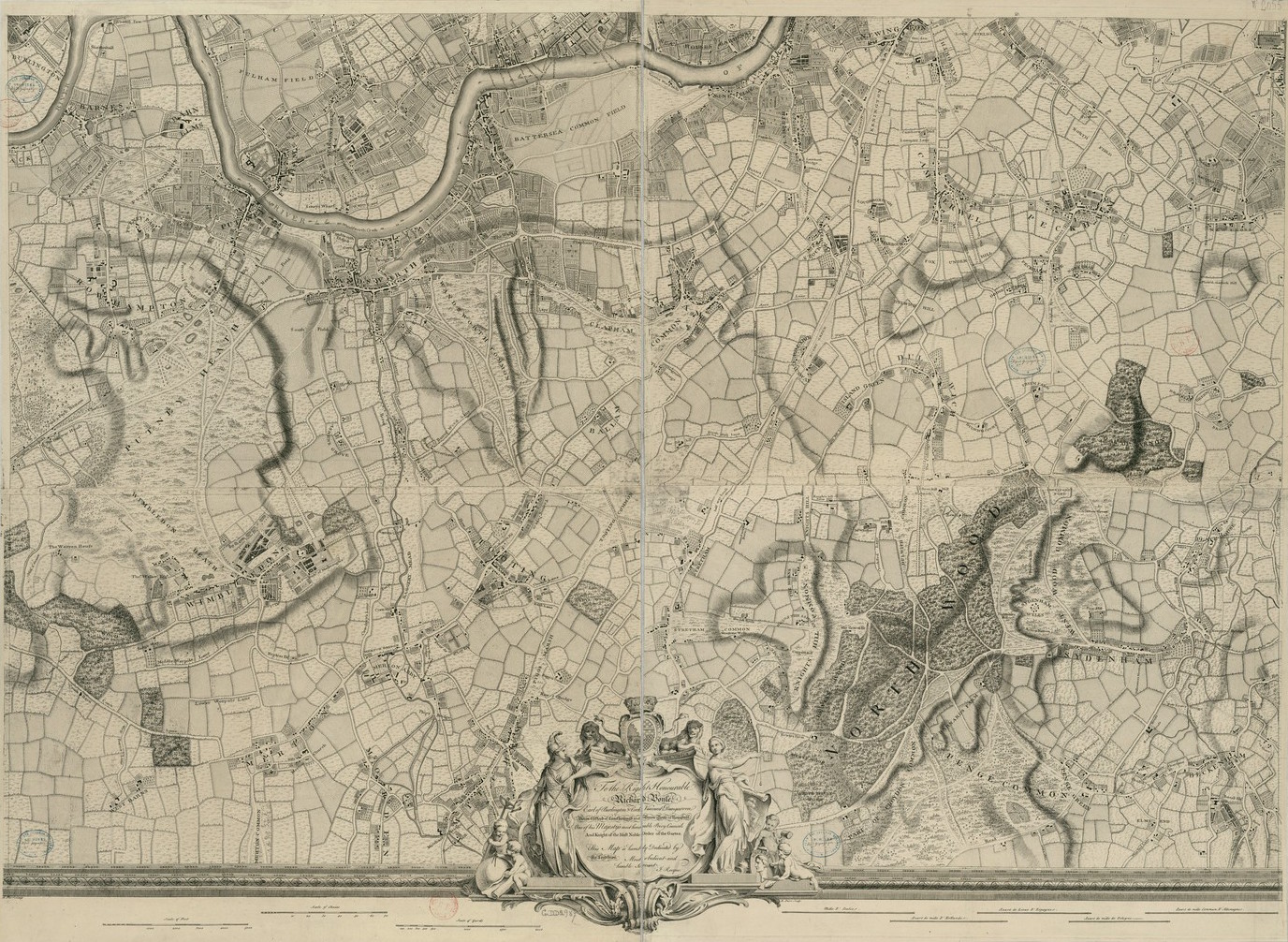
B
	2
This sheet extract is a clickable image for enlargement
