= Sands End =

Area of Fulham, London, England

Coordinates: 51.473°N 0.180°W

- Location within Greater London
- Population: 12,760 (2011 Census.Ward)
- OS grid reference: TQ265765
- London borough: Hammersmith & Fulham
- Ceremonial county: Greater London
- Region: London
- Country: England
- Sovereign state: United Kingdom
- Post town: LONDON
- Postcode district: SW6
- Dialling code: 020
- Police: Metropolitan
- Fire: London
- Ambulance: London
- UK Parliament: Chelsea and Fulham
- London Assembly: West Central

Sands End is an area of the ancient parish of Fulham, formerly in the County of Middlesex, which is now the southernmost part of the London Borough of Hammersmith and Fulham, England. In a deep loop of the River Thames, between the tidal Chelsea Creek and the old Peterborough estate, west of Wandsworth Bridge, its northern edge is New King's Road. While wharves, industrial acres and workers' cottages gave way to intensive re-development such as Chelsea Harbour and Imperial Wharf in the last quarter of the 20th-century, it still contains some 300-year-old cottages and 19th century streets.

== History ==
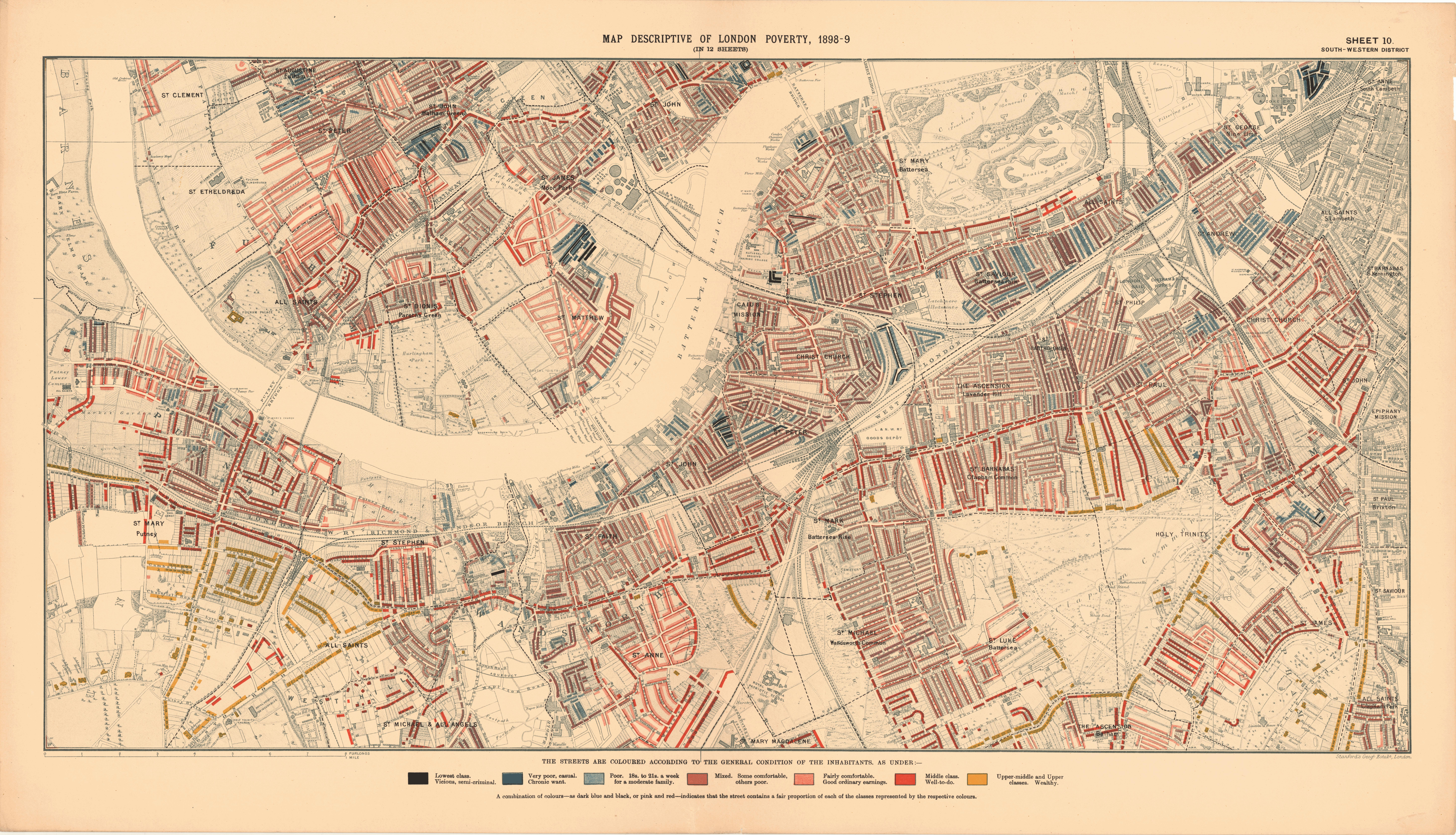
1898 map showing Sands End with the Fulham Gas Works

A map showing the Sands End ward of Fulham Metropolitan Borough as it appeared in 1916

For centuries, this swampy place was a rural backwater, cut off from other villages and the main thoroughfares into the City of London. Its earliest recorded landowner was John de Saundeford in the reign of Edward I. Barbara Denny, a contemporary historian, wrote that King Henry VIII granted the manor of Sandford to the Abbot of Westminster, but that in 1549 it returned to the Crown.

Ten years later, Queen Mary sold it to a mercer from London, William Maynard. Although the estate had a manor house, for centuries the land was used mainly for pasture. Singing nightingales in the 17th-century are said to have arrested the attention of essayist and politician, Joseph Addison (1672–1719), who came to live in his 'retreat' hereabouts, but probably not in Sandford Manor House, which is in present-day Rewell Street, and Grade II* listed. Another reputed resident was Nell Gwyn.

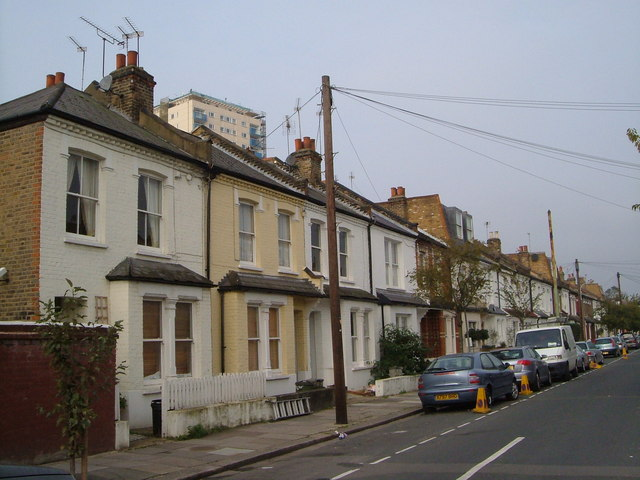
A Victorian terrace in Sands End

=== Origins ===
The historian of Fulham, Charles Féret (1852–1921), devotes several chapters of his three-volume work to the origins of Sands End. As distinct from ownership, settlement of the area did not begin till the Elizabethan era, as can be inferred from this extract from Féret:

A small volume might, indeed, be filled by citations of similar entries referring to lands which had belonged to Goldhawk 'at the Sand.' In the earlier Court Rolls one or two other persons are described as 'atte Sonde'. In 1454 we hear of a 'John Burton atte Sonde.' In a presentment of 1569 there is mentioned a 'Thomas Burton of Sandes.' It is not till the time of the Virgin Queen that we hear of the 'End,' from which we may infer that the nucleus of a tiny village was only then in course of formation. The earliest instance of the name is in 1566, when mention is made of the 'bridge at Sandeande.' In 1575 John Powell, gent, was required to make his fence between 'Gill Hale' and the premises of John Burton at 'Sands Ende.' Two years later this John Burton was ordered to scour his ditches (foveas) at 'Sand End', between 'Gilhalle' and 'Peasecroft' (see vol. ii. p. 83)

=== Industrialisation ===
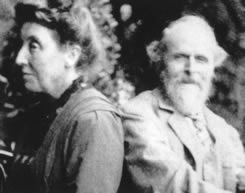
William and Evelyn De Morgan lived and worked in Sands End

In spite of its rural charms, the area was affected by flooding, dampness and the effluent descending from Counter's Creek, sometimes referred to as a sewer, so by the early 19th-century, the estate was in decline. Dr Barton MD, author of 'the Lost Rivers of London', quotes a colleague from the West London Medical Journal, who had observed that rheumatism was unusually common on both sides of Counter's Creek from Shepherd's Bush to Chelsea.

In 1824, twenty acres of the estate were bought by the Imperial Gas Light and Coke Company, the first public utility enterprise in the world. So began almost two centuries of industrialisation and manufacturing. Craftsmen and artists were still attracted to its fringes, most notably, William De Morgan, a friend of William Morris and a member of the Arts and Crafts movement.

The growth of the Temperance movement produced yet another brewery in Fulham, only without any alcohol content. On an eight-acre site in Sands End, just east of Wandsworth Bridge, the Polish-born entrepreneur, Henry Lowenfeld built the Kops Brewery that started production in 1890. It lasted to the dawn of World War I when it was turned into a margarine factory and later turned to food logistics.

In 1901, Fulham Council built its gasworks here, while MacFarlane Lang had established its biscuit factory nearby. Sands End became noted as a close knit working class community in the industrial heartland of Fulham with its gas works, power station and petrol depot providing work for generations of local families.

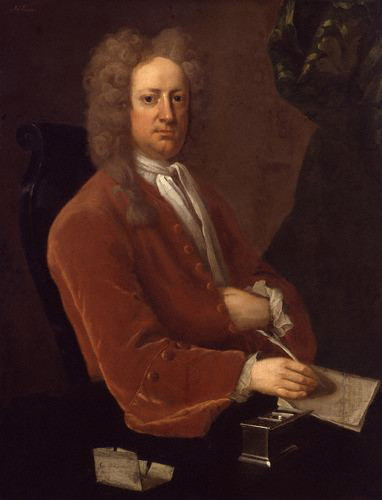
Joseph Addison by Michael Dahl lowres

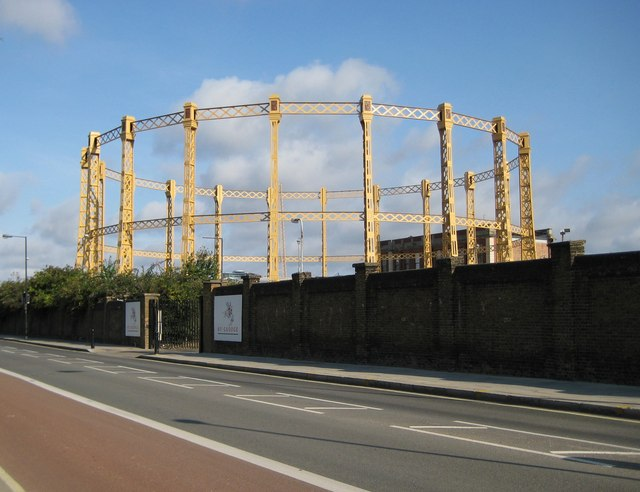
Gasholder at the former Imperial Gasworks

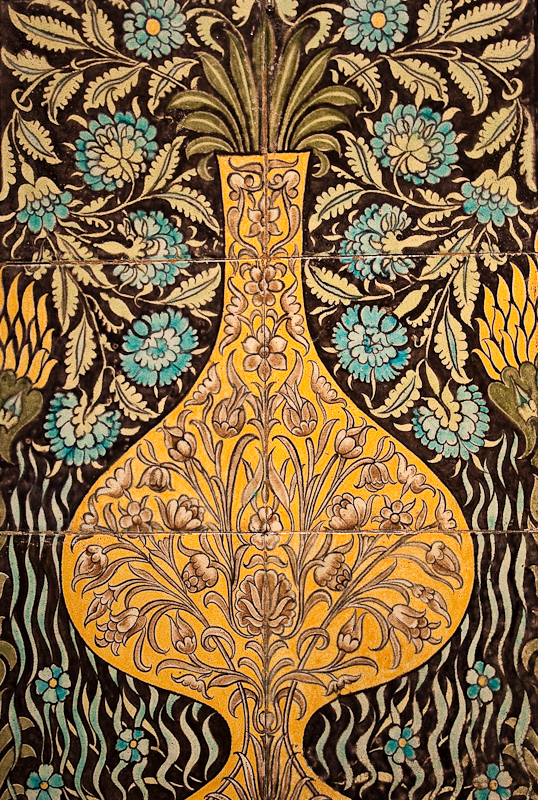
William De Morgan (c. 1890), Sands Ends Pottery: a tile inspired by Middle Eastern patterns.

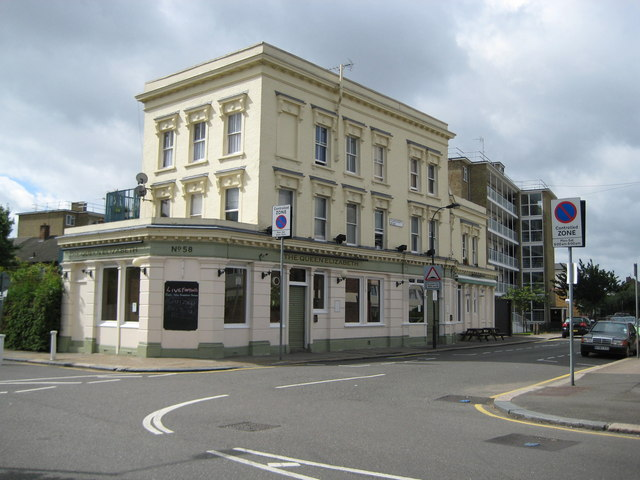
The Queen Elizabeth public house, Pearscroft Road

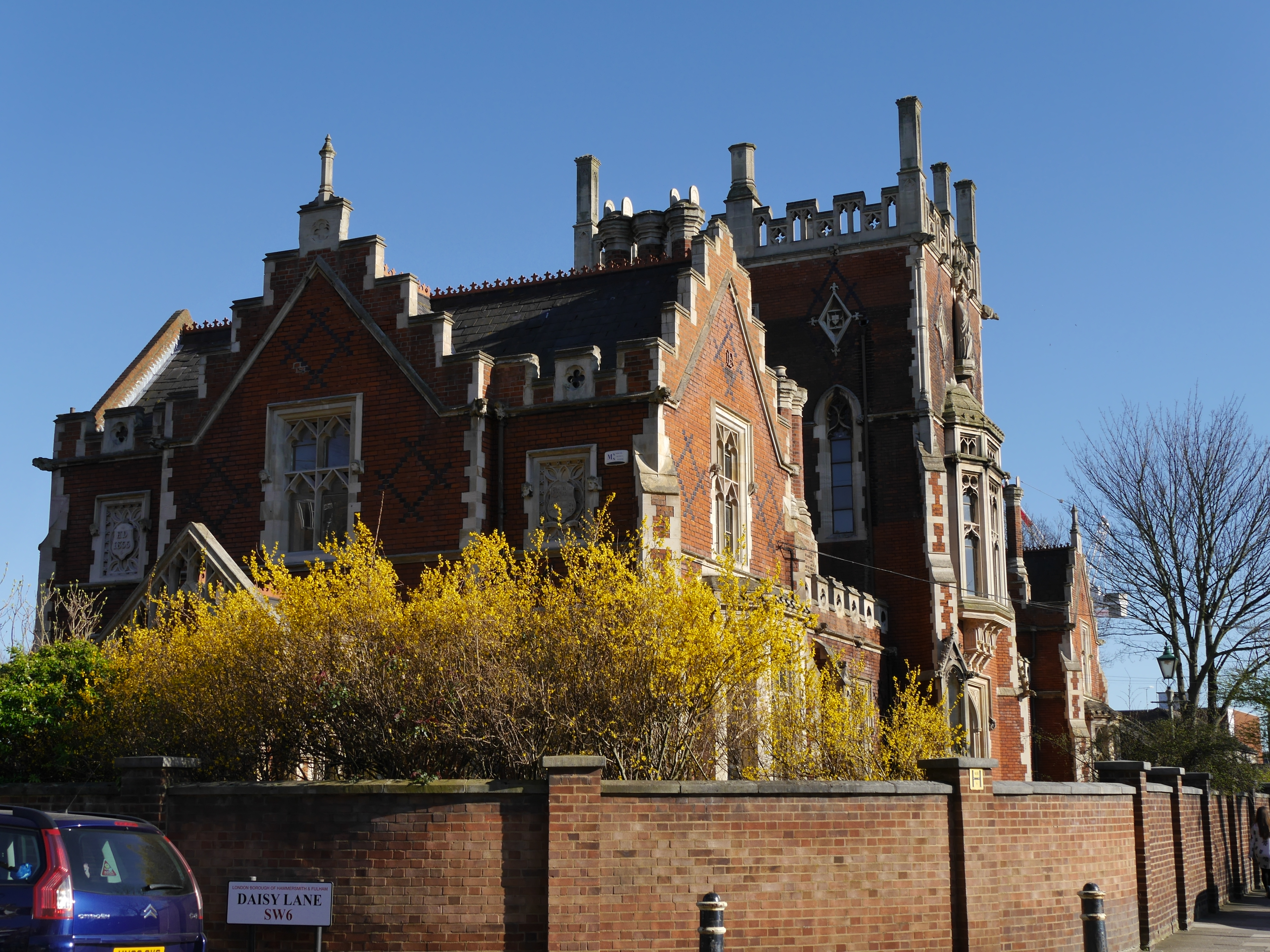
The Castle Club, Daisy Lane, Fulham

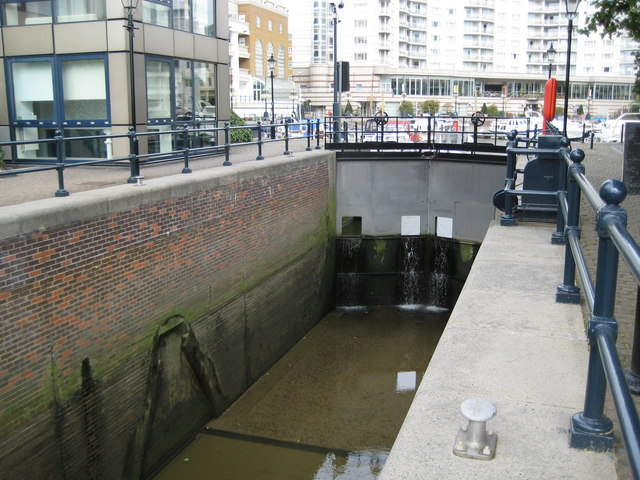
Chelsea Harbour Lock

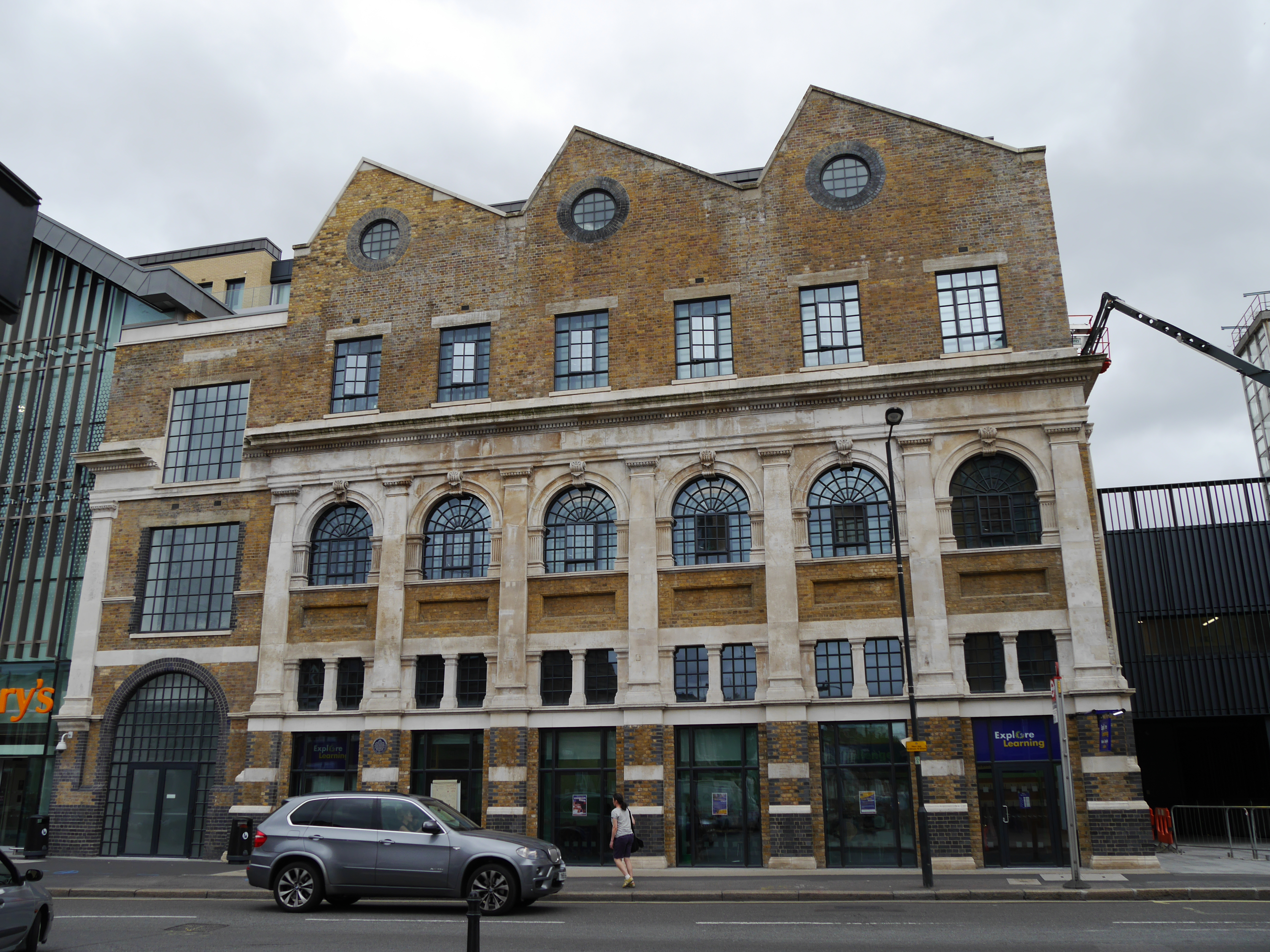
The former Kops Brewery, Townmead Road, Sands End

== 21st-century ==
A property boom begun in the 1970s coupled with the advent of oil-fuelled processing of North Sea oil led to a process of Gentrification with offices and studio businesses and flats on the market for prices more customary in the centre of the capital. On the northern bank of the Thames there is Hurlingham Retail Park, which includes an electrical retailer and tile stores. There is also a business enterprise centre in the Sulivan district. Across the other side of Townmead Road there is a very large food and home wares supermarket, and Imperial Wharf, a brownfield development of the former Imperial Gasworks which is growing to include a mixture of affordable housing, both private and public, shops, a park and a new railway station.

Also in this part of Fulham is South Park. Wandsworth Bridge Road runs through Sands End and has restaurants, tile and pine furniture shops, and the Church of England parish church of Saint Matthew.

== Transport ==
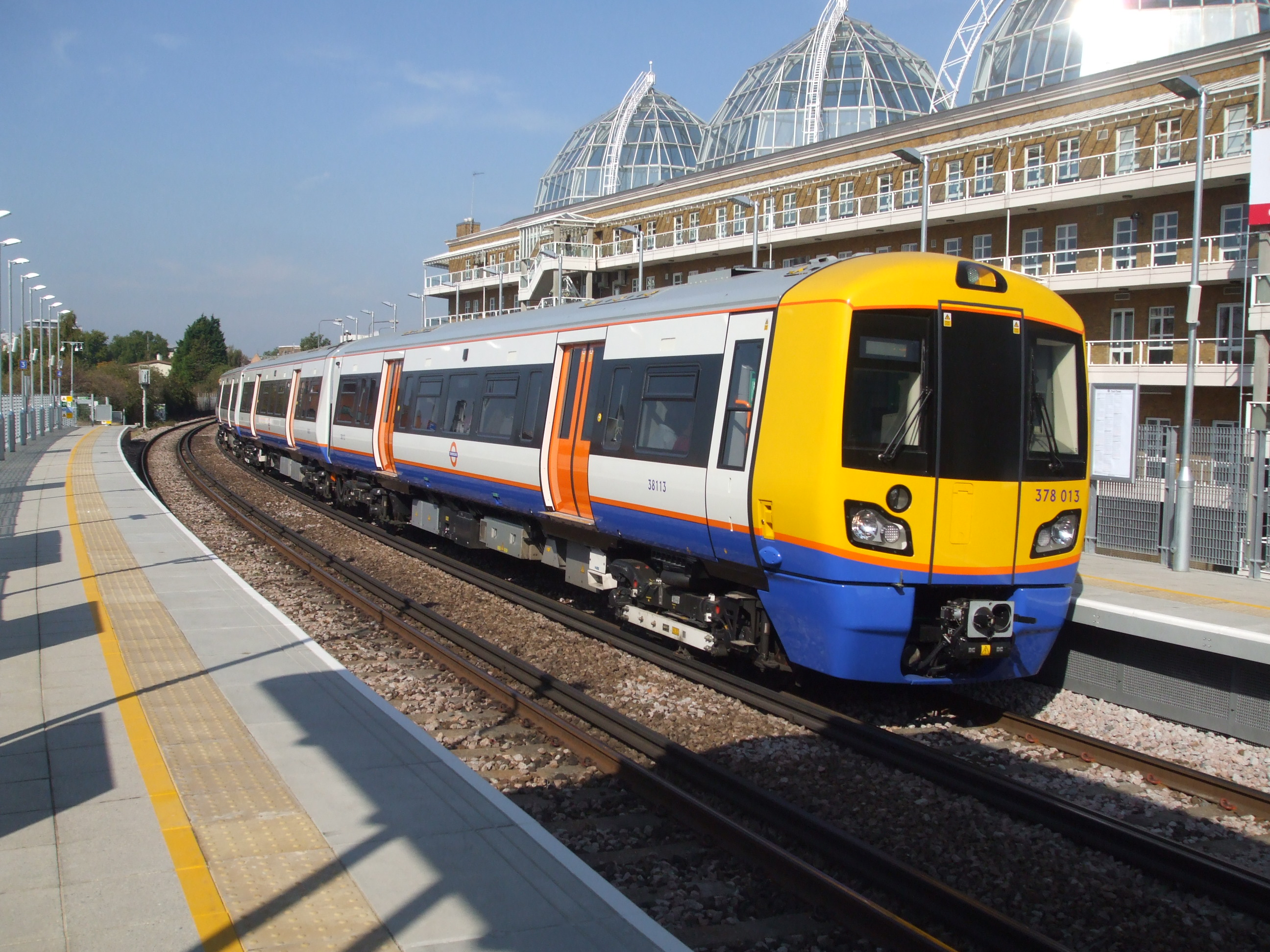
Imperial Wharf station

Because of the notoriously poor transport links for the area (including Chelsea Harbour), including the absence of tube stations due to the many medieval plague pits which deterred their building in Victorian times, the nearby Imperial Wharf station was opened on 27 September 2009, providing direct rail links with Clapham Junction and Willesden Junction via Kensington (Olympia). Southern also provides direct train services from Imperial Wharf to Watford Junction and East Croydon. It is hoped that the area will be re-vitalized by the new station and transport links in the areas which were previously served only by bus routes 391 and C3.

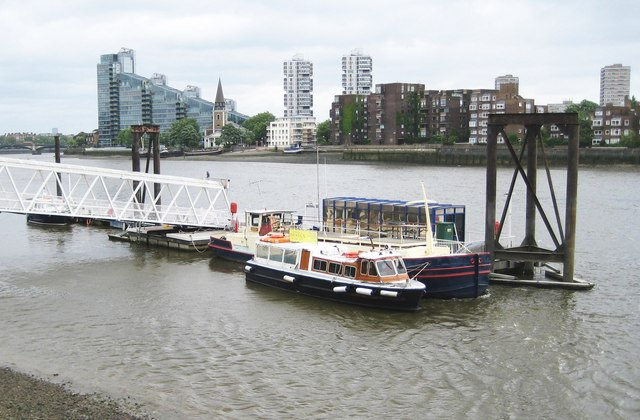
Chelsea Harbour Pier

River bus services are provided at peak hours by London River Services from Chelsea Harbour Pier, and offer transport to Putney and Blackfriars Millennium Pier.

== Politics ==
Sands End is part of the Sands End ward for elections to Hammersmith and Fulham London Borough Council.

== Demographics ==
Sands End is a multicultural ward: 38% of residents belong to an ethnic minority and 44% were born outside the UK.
