= Herbert Rose =

Herbert Rose may refer to:

- Herbert Rose (artist) (1890–1937), Australian painter and etcher
- H. J. Rose (1883–1961), British classical scholar

== See also ==
- Bert Rose (1919–2001), football executive
- Herbert Rose Barraud (1845–1896), portrait photographer
