= Clive Boultbee Brooks =

British multi-millionaire property developer (born 1963)

Clive Boultbee Brooks (born July 1963) is a multi-millionaire property developer. He is founder of commercial property developer Boultbee and founder and Managing Director of Boultbee Brooks Real Estate.

According to The Sunday Times Rich List in 2019, Boultbee Brooks is worth £319 million.

== Career ==
Born in 1963, Boultbee Brooks originally trained as a chartered surveyor.

In 1987, Boultbee Brooks co-founded property development company Boultbee alongside his brother, Steve, with £7,000. The company initially started developing industrial space in Shoreditch, London.

Over the coming years, Boultbee Brooks built large holdings in UK shopping malls before subsequently disposing of these assets before the 2008 financial crisis. In the four years running up to 2005, the brothers sold 17 shopping centres totaling €1 billion, choosing to focus on mainland European real estate instead.

As of 2006, the company had acquired $2.7 billion of European commercial real estate funded with $1.9 billion of debt. At the time the company was based in a converted cocoa barge moored at Cadogan Pier in Chelsea on the River Thames.

In 2007, the brothers bought 10 shopping centres in Sweden from the Swedish government.

In 2014, Boultbee Brooks launched a UK-focused property company, Boultbee Brooks Real Estate.

== Personal life ==
Boultbee Brooks is a keen farmer and lives near Hereford. In 2009, Boultbee Brooks alongside his brother Steve bought a 1944 Mk IX Second World War fighter at Bonhams for £1.58m.
