= Imperial Wharf railway station =

London Overground station

Imperial Wharf
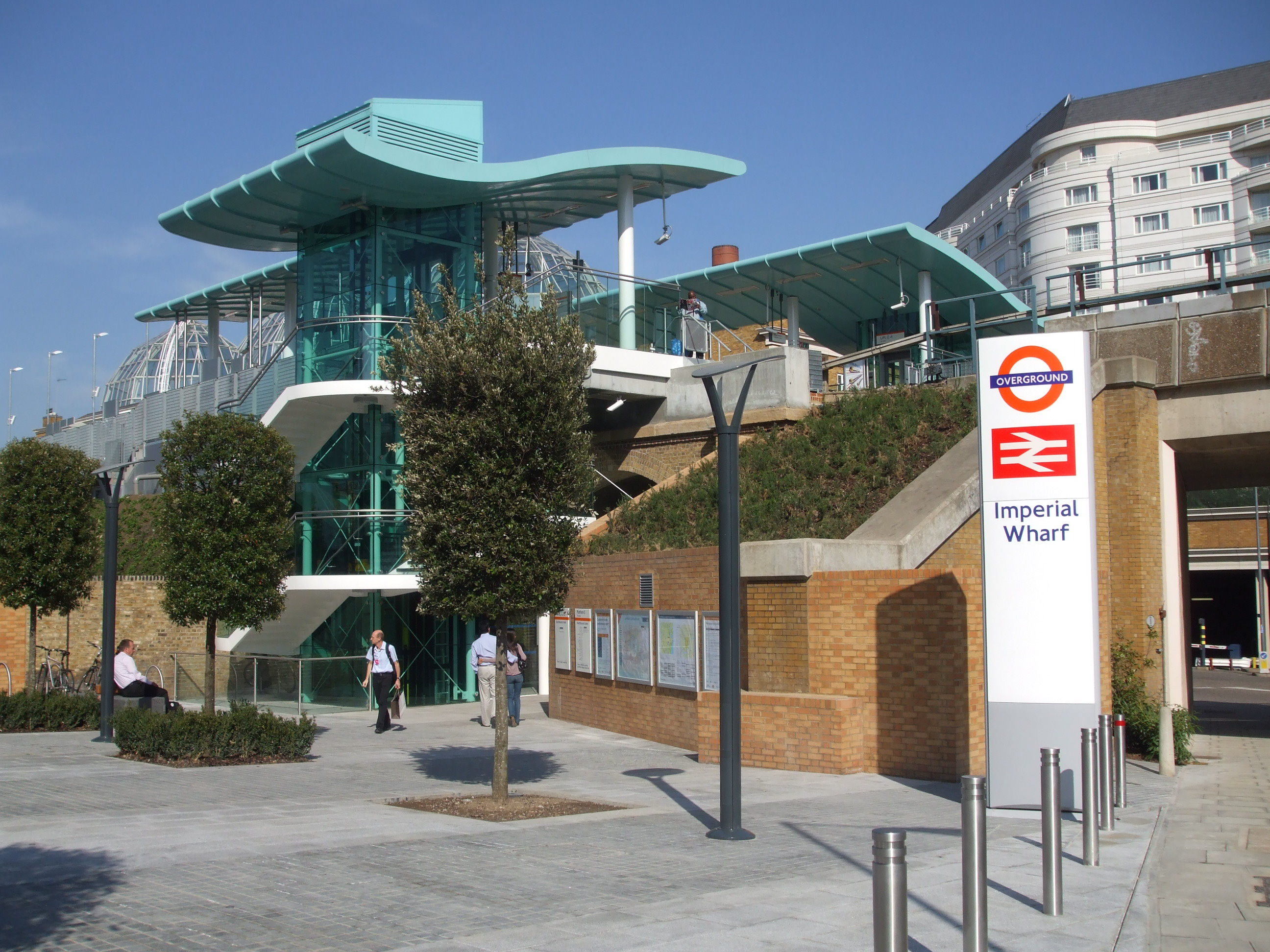
- Western (northbound) entrance, 27 September 2009
- Interactive map of Imperial Wharf

General information
- Location: Sands End
- Local authority: Hammersmith and Fulham
- Managed by: London Overground
- Owner: Transport for London
- Station code: IMW
- DfT category: E
- Number of platforms: 2
- Accessible: Yes
- Fare zone: 2

National Rail annual entry and exit
- 2020–21: ▼1.010 million
- 2021–22: ▲2.324 million
- 2022–23: ▲2.707 million
- 2023–24: ▲3.018 million
- 2024–25: ▼2.859 million

Key dates
- 27 September 2009: Opened

Other information
- External links: Departures; Facilities
- Coordinates: 51.47517°N 0.18281°W

Imperial Wharf is an interchange station between National Rail services and the Mildmay line of the London Overground, located in Sands End in West London. Opened on 27 September 2009, the station is located on the West London line in between West Brompton and Clapham Junction stations. The station is managed by London Overground. Chelsea Harbour Pier is located 250 m (820 ft) away, providing interchange with Thames Clippers boat services.

The station is located where the existing railway line passes over Townmead Road in Sands End. Its name is taken from the adjacent residential development of a brownfield site, which has been redeveloped into a luxury 1,800 apartment riverside complex by property developer St George since 2004. A further planning application for 1,500 residential units including a 37-storey tower was submitted to Hammersmith & Fulham Council in early 2009. The station is also adjacent to Chelsea Harbour, and was known by this name during early stages of development.

== History ==
Calls for a station here were met in 2005 with a fully costed station and signalling at £3 million, of which £1.7 million had already been provided by Berkeley Homes Plc through its St George upmarket London-focused subsidiary, the developer of the Imperial Wharf site, leaving a funding shortfall of £1.3 million.

In October 2007, Hammersmith and Fulham Council announced that St George Homes had agreed to provide another £1.2 million, roughly enough to complete the project. It is also reported that the planning permission for the whole of the Imperial Wharf development was only given on the basis that a station was built.

The station secured full funding on 28 April 2008. The total cost of the station was £7.8 million with the following contributions: £4.8 million from St George, £1 million from Transport for London, £650,000 from the Royal Borough of Kensington and Chelsea and £1.35 million from the London Borough of Hammersmith and Fulham. The first services from the station ran on Sunday 27 September 2009, with a formal opening ceremony by the Mayor of London, Boris Johnson, on 29 September.

== Locale ==
The new station provides an important link for the Sands End area to Clapham Junction station in the south of London and northwards towards Willesden Junction station. This will be particularly important as the area is further developed by both private and public organisations. This investment includes a new residential development called "The Gallery" which has been started on recently cleared land next to the Laura Ashley offices, between Bagleys Lane and Elbe Street.

There are also plans by another developer to redevelop the Lots Road Power Station into 395 residential units. The semi-derelict building, on Chelsea Creek close to the River Thames, is a large, disused, coal-fired power station. It was designed in 1902 and completed in 1905 and until 2003 was used to provide power for London Underground. The developers had hoped to complete the redevelopment by 2013.

== Services ==
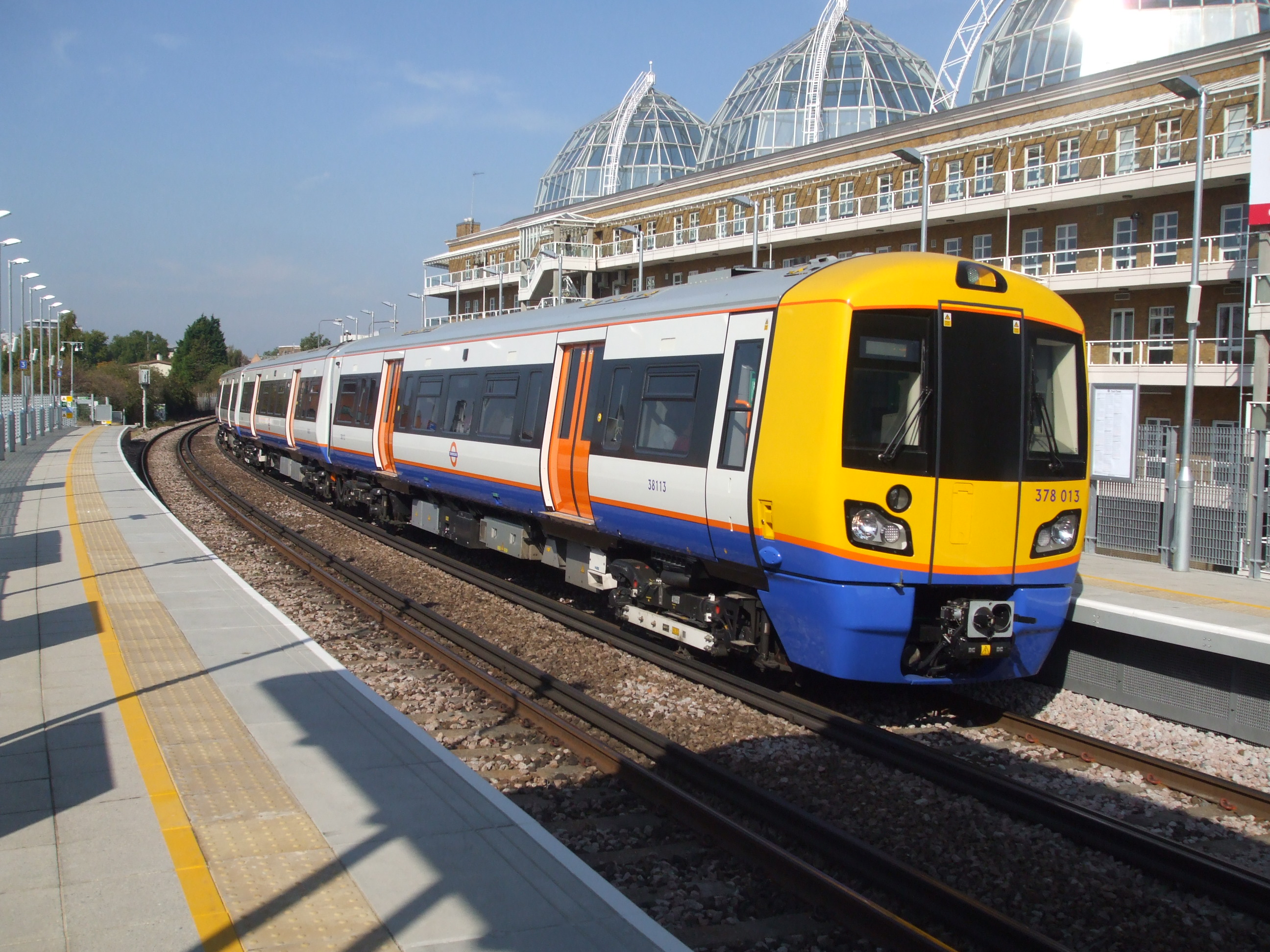
A London Overground train at Imperial Wharf

Imperial Wharf station is located on the Mildmay line of the London Overground, with services operated using Class 378 EMUs. Additional National Rail services are provided by Southern using Class 377 EMUs.

The typical off-peak service in trains per hour is:

- 4 tph to Stratford via Willesden Junction
- 1 tph to Watford Junction
- 4 tph to Clapham Junction
- 1 tph to East Croydon

Additional services call at the station during the peak hours.

During the late evenings, Mildmay line services at the station run between Clapham Junction and Willesden Junction only.

Preceding station	National Rail	Following station
West Brompton	Southern West London Line	Clapham Junction
Preceding station	London Overground	Following station
West Brompton towards Stratford	Mildmay line West London line	Clapham Junction Terminus

== Connections ==
- London Bus routes 306, 424 and C3 serve the station.
- Chelsea Harbour Pier, which is approximately 250 metres away provides river buses services.

== Abandoned future proposal ==
There were proposals, supported by RBK&C, to include a stop at this location, on the proposed Crossrail 2 line (known for a time as the 'Chelsea-Hackney Line'). If these plans were carried forward, then it would provide an interchange between London Overground services and either London Underground or main line commuter rail services, depending on which standards the new line is built to.

However, as of 2025, it is unlikely that Crossrail 2 can proceed via this location due to the engineering complexities of a kink in the route between the proposed Chelsea station and Clapham Junction. The nearest London Underground stations will remain Fulham Broadway, West Brompton and Sloane Square. Fulham Broadway was also once planned for the Crossrail 2 route but aborted.
