= Chelsea Harbour Pier =

Pier on the River Thames in London, United Kingdom

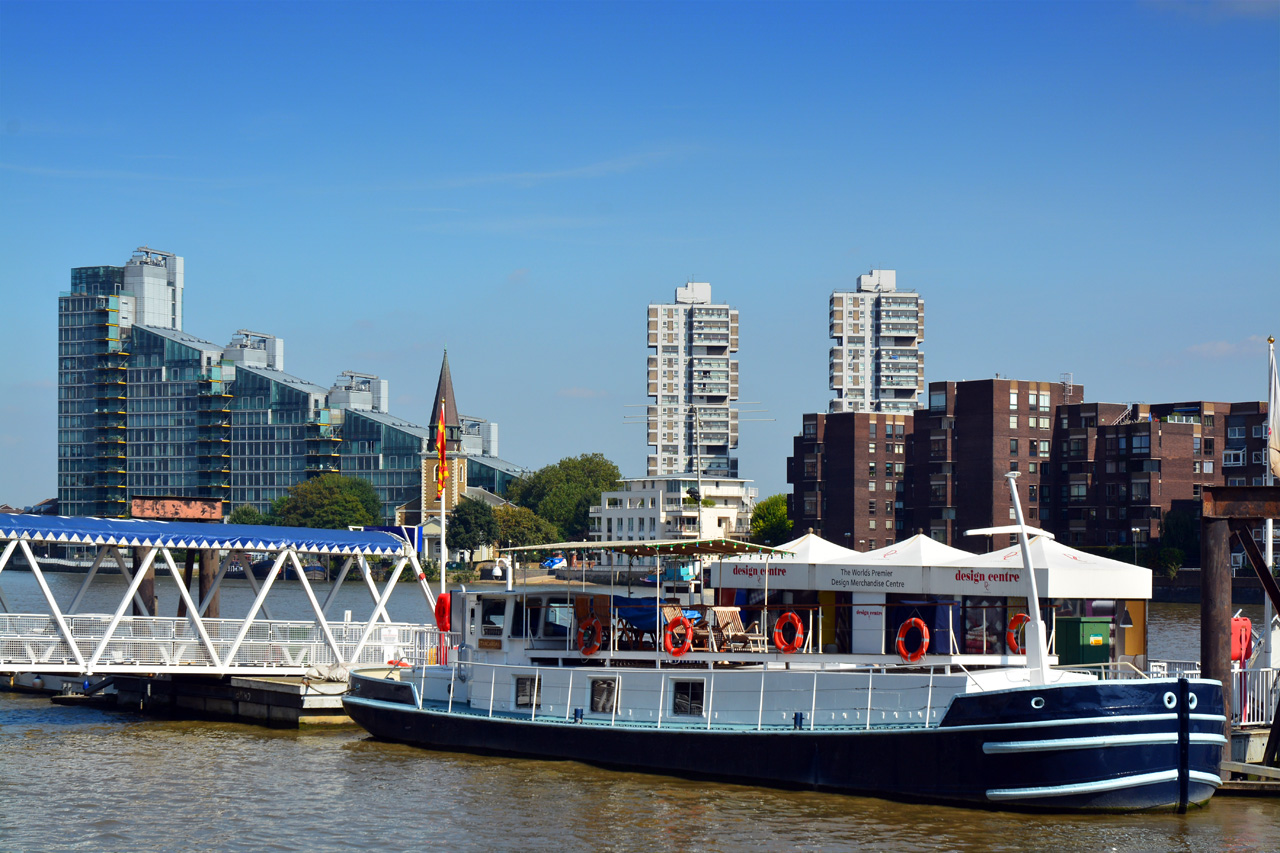
- Chelsea Harbour Pier on the Thames
- Type: River bus and tourist/leisure services
- Location: River Thames, London, UK
- Coordinates: 51.47517°N 0.18281°W
- Owner: Chelsea Harbour
- Operator: Uber Boat by Thames Clippers

History
- Location within London Borough of Hammersmith and Fulham

Chelsea Harbour Pier is a pier on the River Thames, in London, United Kingdom. It is located on the North Bank of the Thames, in the Sands End area of Fulham. The pier serves the redeveloped Chelsea Harbour, a former commercial wharf which has been converted to luxury residential use.

== Services ==
The pier is served by boats operated by Uber Boat by Thames Clippers, under contract from London River Services. Services operate between Putney Pier and Canary Wharf Pier and on weekends to North Greenwich Pier in central London.

== Interchange ==
The pier is located approximately 200 metres from Imperial Wharf railway station on the West London Line. Rail services provided by London Overground and Southern offer direct connections to stations in North London and beyond.

Preceding station	London River Services	Following station
St Mary's Wandsworth Pier towards Putney Pier	RB6	Cadogan Pier towards Barking Riverside Pier
