= Mansford =

British private equity real estate company

- Type: Limited Partnerships
- Industry: Private equity real estate
- Founded: 1995; 31 years ago
- Headquarters: London, United Kingdom
- Key people: Justin Dowley (Chairman) Oliver Smith & Charles Knight (Joint Managing Partners)
- Products: Investments, private equity funds
- AUM: £3bn
- Website: www.mansford.com

Mansford is a British multi-strategy private equity real estate firm owned and controlled by its Joint Managing Partners Oliver Smith and Charles Knight, who have worked together since 1995.

== History ==
Mansford was formed in 1995, investing c£3bn in direct real estate investment and operating platforms including Boatfolk (11 UK coastal marinas including Cowes and Portland, built for the 2012 Olympics) & Student Cribs, the UK's largest owner/operator of non PBSA Student HMO Houses.

In 1999, Mansford was the investor behind Chelsea Harbour having acquired it from P&O.

The group acquired a number of prominent assets in the UK including Whitbread's Chiswell Brewery, the Manchester Arena (which they acquired in 2014), SkyDome Arena in Coventry, Castle Quarter, three of Cardiff's historical listed arcades, Woolwich London Estate and a number of high-profile office and residential properties in London including Phoenix Brewery in Notting Hill.

In 2018, the company sold its direct commercial assets to focus on its operating business platforms Boatfolk Marina Group (11 UK coastal marinas) and Student Cribs (5,000 student HMO house and flat units).
