= Cadogan Pier =

Pier on the River Thames in London

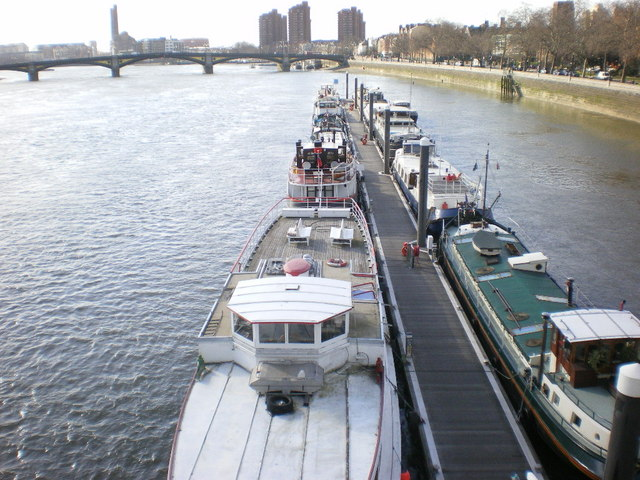
- Type: River bus and tourist/leisure services
- Location: River Thames, London, UK
- Coordinates: 51.4827928°N 0.1670809°W
- Owner: London River Services
- Operator: Uber Boat by Thames Clippers

History
- Location within Royal Borough of Kensington and Chelsea

Cadogan Pier is a pier on the River Thames in London, UK. It is located on the North Bank of the river, immediately next to the Albert Bridge on Cheyne Walk near Chelsea Embankment. It has been Chelsea's only river transport link for over 150 years.

== History ==
Cadogan Pier was built in 1841 to bring potential buyers to Lord Cadogan's new estate of houses in Chelsea. It was a landmark structure and was the prime river gateway for visitors to Chelsea. The Pier was rebuilt in 1875 to accommodate Albert Bridge, London, that has been recognised as one of London's most beautiful bridges. The Pier has been used for many things of importance in its long history, most recently (February 2019) for the "Royal Jubilee Pageant." The Pier is and will most likely forever be a London landmark and one of its kind in Chelsea.

== Design ==
It was erected by Earl Cadogan by 1841 and designed by Nathaniel Handford. It was rebuilt around 1875 following the completion of Albert Bridge. The London County Council obtained the pier from the Thames Conservancy Board and repaired it in 1905. In 1996 it was bought by Cadogan Pier Limited from the Port of London Authority. The pier was extended in 2004 to designs by Beckett Rankine. In 2010 a boat moored there was put up for sale for £1 million.

Cadogan Pier Limited has hosted the finish line of the Doggett's Coat and Badge Race for the Chelsea Society. It has also restored the historical landmark 'CADOGAN PIER' sign and twin Union Jack flags, put in place a professional team to maintain the pier, and improved the waiting area for the river bus. The company plans to continue investing in the pier to ensure that it becomes fully accessible to a wider group of people and better serves the local community. Without continued investment, the current pier will no longer be able to provide a landing stage for the river bus service and Chelsea could lose its only river transport link. The pier currently has poor access for disabled visitors, families with buggies and older people.

== Services ==
The pier is served by Uber Boat by Thames Clippers' RB6 commuter service to Putney and Canary Wharf, operating from Monday to Friday. The service extends to Royal Wharf during off peak times.

Preceding station	London River Services	Following station
Chelsea Harbour Pier towards Putney Pier	RB6	Battersea Power Station Pier towards Barking Riverside Pier
