= Chelsea Waterfront =

Residential development in Chelsea, London

Coordinates: 51.47783°N 0.17986°W

Redevelopment of Lots Road Power Station with Chelsea Waterfront West Tower visible on the left

Chelsea Waterfront is a residential development in Chelsea in West London. It consists largely of the disused Lots Road Power Station which was refurbished for residential use, and two highrises of 122 m (400 ft) and 85 m (279 ft). It neighbours the late 20th century Chelsea Harbour development, and postwar World's End Estate.

== History and description ==
=== Background ===
Lots Road Power Station, operating since 1905 was first sold to developers in 1999, with the station decommissioned by 2002. Terry Farrell began working as architect for the site, beginning design planning from 1996. Planning applications were complicated by the fact the site straddled two boroughs, Kensington and Chelsea and Hammersmith of Fulham. Full planning permission for the site was granted by 2006.

=== Construction ===
The development consists of the refurbishment of Lots Road Power Station into residential units, two tall residential towers as well as landscaping of public areas and the construction of a new "high street". Space is also provided to accommodate shops and educational facilities including for Chelsea Academy. Farell was unusually meticulously involved with the plans of the site, the Financial Times giving the example that he was involved with the design of door handles. The taller West Tower, part of phase one, was topped out by 2018, work on the power station itself was completed by 2024. The entire development was completed by 2026.

== See also ==
- Chelsea Harbour
- Lots Road Power Station
