= Greenwich Power Station =

Power station in Greenwich, London, England

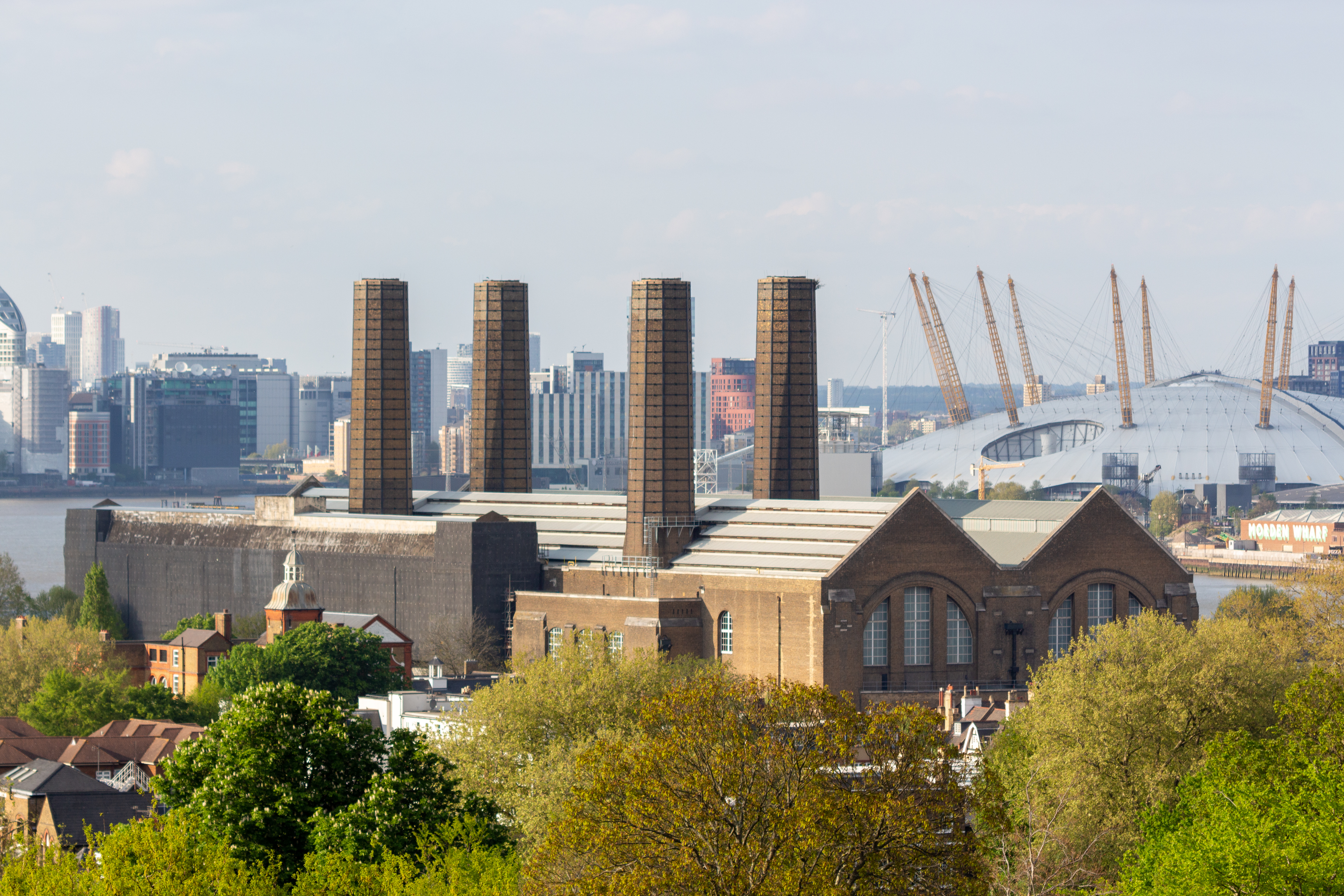
- Greenwich Power Station with The O_{2} visible in the background.
- Country: United Kingdom
- Location: Greater London
- Coordinates: 51.485°N 0.001°W
- Status: Operational
- Construction began: 1902
- Commission date: 1906

Thermal power station
- Primary fuel: Gas
- Cogeneration?: Yes

Power generation
- Units operational: 6
- Nameplate capacity: 155 MW

External links
- Commons: Related media on Commons

Greenwich Power Station is a standby gas and formerly oil and coal-fired power station by the River Thames at Greenwich in south-east London. Originally constructed to supply power for London's tram system, since 1988 it has been London Underground's central emergency power supply, providing power if there is partial or total loss of National Grid supplies.

== History ==
The power station was constructed on the riverside site of a former tram depot operated by the London Tramways Company (and before that by the Pimlico Peckham & Greenwich Street Tramway Company, taken over in 1873). An act of Parliament, the London County Council (Tramways and Improvements) Act 1902 (2 Edw. 7. c. ccxix), empowered London County Council to construct new tramways, improve existing ones and to "erect maintain and use a station for generating and transforming electrical energy with all necessary engines dynamos plant and machinery."

The station was designed by William Edward Riley, chief architect of the LCC architects department, and built in two sections between 1902 and 1910, to provide power for London County Council Tramways. The first section was formally opened on 26 May 1906 by Sir Evan Spicer, chairman of the county council. Surplus power was used by other electric tramways and the Underground Electric Railways Company of London. The station originally had a coal-fired boiler house, fuelled by coal craned from barges on the River Thames, and an engine room. This housed four John Musgrave and Sons compound reciprocating Corliss 'Manhattan'-type steam engines each driving 3,500 kW 6,600 volts at 25 hertz flywheel-type alternators.

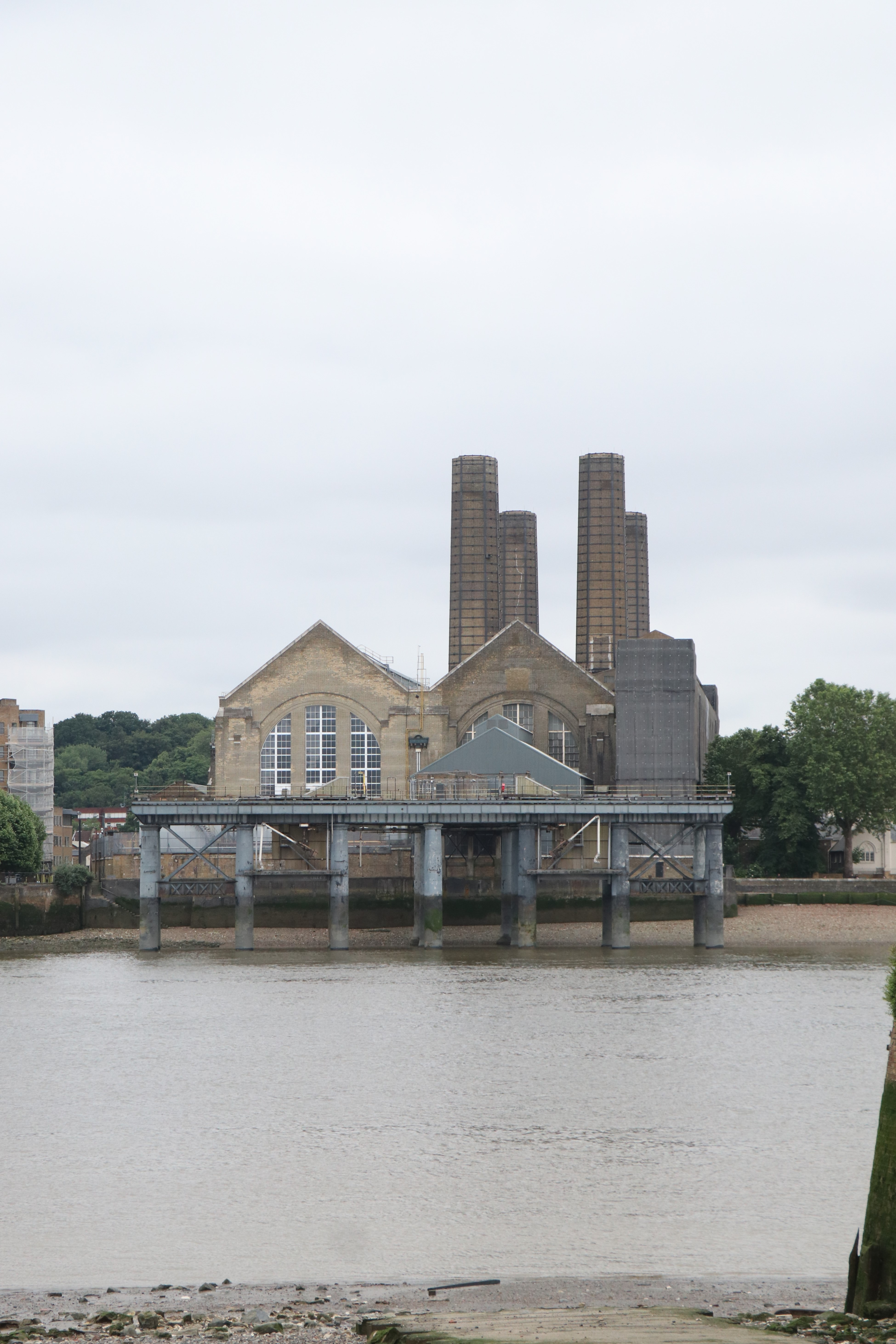
Greenwich Power Station, London, viewed from Newcastle Draw Dock on the Isle of Dogs

The station is an early London example of a steel-framed building with a stone-clad brick cover. (Note: For non-industrial buildings, the Ritz Hotel, 1904-05, was considered to be London's first major steel-framed structure, though an extension at the Savoy Hotel, 1903-04, slightly predates it.) In area it measures 114 m (374 ft) by 59 m (194 ft), with a maximum roof height of 24 m (79 ft). It is divided into two naves: the west nave, originally the boiler house, is now the turbine hall; the east nave, now largely unused, was the former engine room. The external stock brick walls include Portland stone decorations, notably on the south and north elevations. Corrugated sheeting replaced the original slate roof. The coaling pier was designed by the LCC's chief engineer, Maurice Fitzmaurice.

By 1910 the advantages of steam turbines were well known and four steam 5,000kW turbine alternators were installed in the second stage of the station's building programme. The reciprocating engines installed during the first stage were replaced by steam turbines in 1922. The power plant's piping installation was manufactured and supplied by the Brightside Foundry & Engineering Co. Ltd, Sheffield

Two 16,000-kW turbo alternator sets were added in 1932 when the station was owned and operated by the London County Council in connection with its tramway system. In 1938 London Passenger Transport Board had taken control of the station and they added a further four B.T.H. 16,000-kW turbo-alternators which followed a further three units that had been installed. Steam for the extensions was provided by sixteen stoker fired Yarrow boilers with a normal evaporative capacity of 50,000 lb. per hour. With this addition the capacity of the site reached 112,000 kW.

The two chimneys of stage one were 249 ft (76 m) high but, following objections from the nearby Royal Observatory (the station was immediately below the Prime Meridian and the meridian of the Altazimuth), the chimneys of stage two were reduced to 180 ft (55 m) height. The taller chimneys were eventually reduced to the height of the later chimneys during a modernisation programme between 1969 and 1972.

The steam turbines were replaced by Rolls-Royce gas turbine generators connected to Power Turbines from former Stal-Laval, Finspång, Sweden today named Siemens-Energy AB. These originally burned oil, but were later converted to burn oil and gas. The generators are still housed in what was formerly the boiler house. They have a total capacity of 117.6 megawatts (MW), generated at 11,000 volts. This voltage can be increased to 22,000 volts for connection to the London Underground electricity system. The gas turbines were originally introduced to supplement output from London Underground's west London power station at Lots Road. When LU began to use National Grid power supplies in 1998 and Lots Road was subsequently decommissioned, Greenwich became LU's central emergency power supply and London's only original power station still in operation. Its six engines provide power if there is partial or total loss of National Grid supplies, enabling safe evacuation of passengers and staff from London's underground network.

In 2015, TfL instigated a 20-year programme to install up to six new gas engines in Greenwich Power Station's Old Turbine Hall. They were envisaged as providing a steady source of reliable, low carbon power for the Tube as well as hot water and heating for nearby schools and homes. However, after local objections about increased air pollution, the proposal was withdrawn in December 2016 ‘to allow time for a review of the project to ensure it aligns with the priorities of the new Mayoral administration’. (During 2016, a combined heat and power (CHP) energy centre had been constructed on a nearby Greenwich Peninsula site to provide district heating to an eventual total of 15,700 properties.)

== Operations ==
Coal was delivered by barge to the large coal jetty in the river, which stands on 16 Doric-styled, cast iron columns. From 1927, the coal was then conveyed to then white-painted storage bunkers constructed on the west side of the station (following remedial work in 2013, the bunkers were coloured black). After the transition to oil-fired operation, its cranes (previously also used for coal ash removal) were removed and the jetty was modified to allow fuel oil to be pumped ashore from river tankers. However, the pier is now disused as any oil used at the station comes by road tanker.

In 2020, the turbines were switched on once per month on average for up to two hours, and TfL was reviewing the power station's future as emergency back-up power provider. In January 2021, a gas turbine generator contained in a unit on the ground floor was destroyed by fire.

== In popular culture ==
Greenwich Power Station was a location used to accompany the track "Heartland" in Infected: The Movie, a 1986 music video collection featuring The The.

Almost 20 years later, the power station appeared in the music video for "The Importance of Being Idle", a song by the English rock band Oasis which reached number one in the UK charts in 2005.
