= Herbert Rose (artist) =

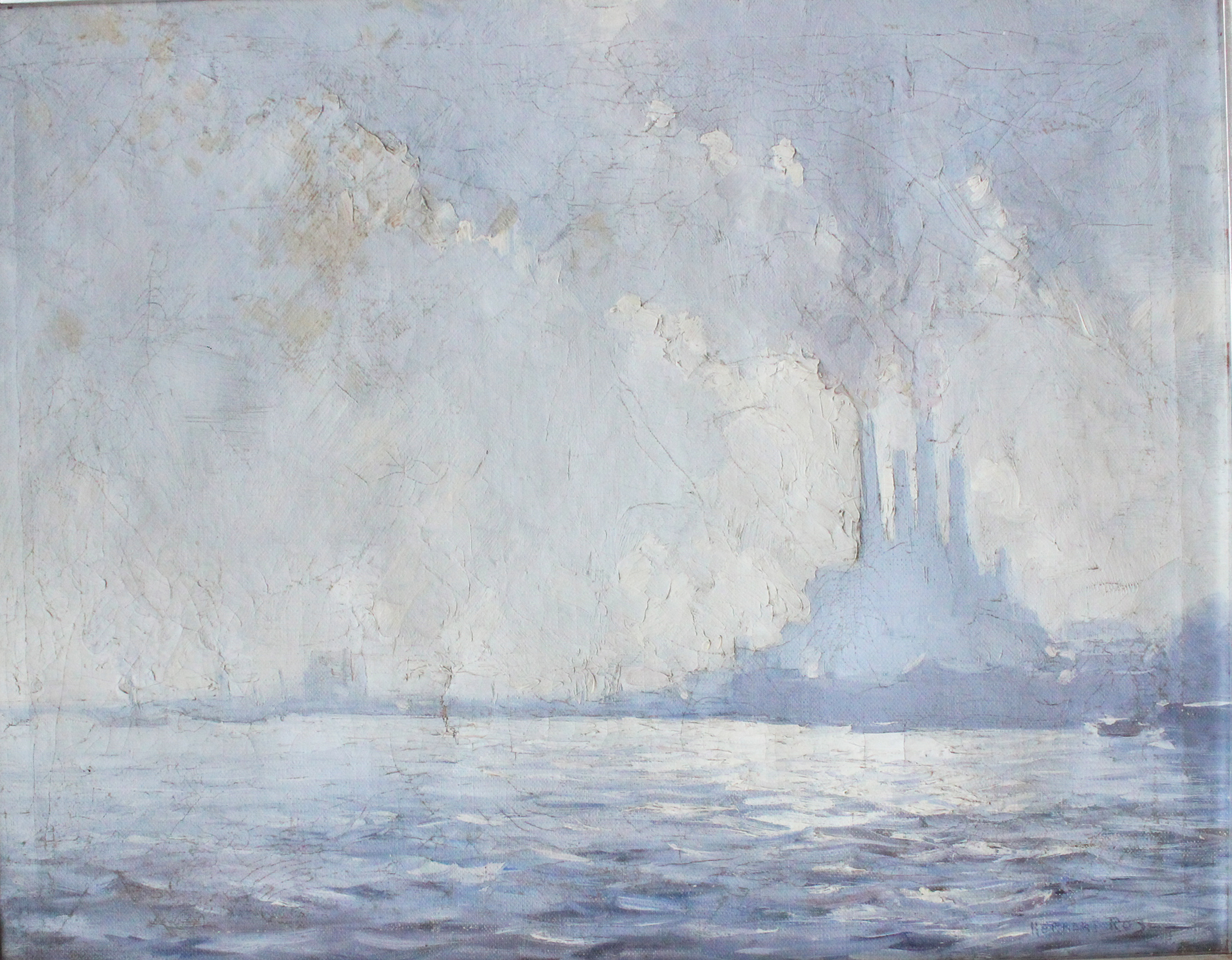
Herbert C. Rose, Lots Road Power Station, London. Oil on canvas. Adnan Ege Kutay Collection, USA.

Herbert C. Rose (1890 – January 1937), an Australian painter and etcher, was born at Windsor, Melbourne, the son of George Rose, (1861–1942), an Australian photographer. He and his brothers Walter and William assisted in his father's photographic business, and Herbert Rose later studied art at the National Gallery of Victoria School from 1914 to 1918 and with the Société des Artistes Français, a successor to the Paris Salon. He travelled to Europe, North Africa and Asia, and, according to an art critic for The Argus, he "excelled in painting eastern crowds and architecture", was "a capable painter in both oils and water-colours, and also did interesting work in etching". He exhibited at the Royal Academy of Arts and elsewhere in Europe and the United States, and staged one-man shows in Australia. His work is represented in Melbourne's and other Australian galleries.

Art critic Harold Brocklebank Herbert (1891–1945) described his painting of sunlight in the Sedon Galleries exhibition catalogue (1937): "His sunlight is warm and glows with that 'inner glow"’ that is the despair of so many painters".

Rose died at Delhi, India, from smallpox around the middle of January 1937. ”

Reviewing a posthumous 1952 exhibition of his oil paintings, drawings and etchings at the Sedon Galleries in Melbourne, the art critic for the Australian newspaper The Age, wrote that Rose had been "an extremely competent academic draftsman“ with an ability to skilfully suggest light and incisively render architectural detail.
