= Lots Road Power Station =

Disused power station in Chelsea, London

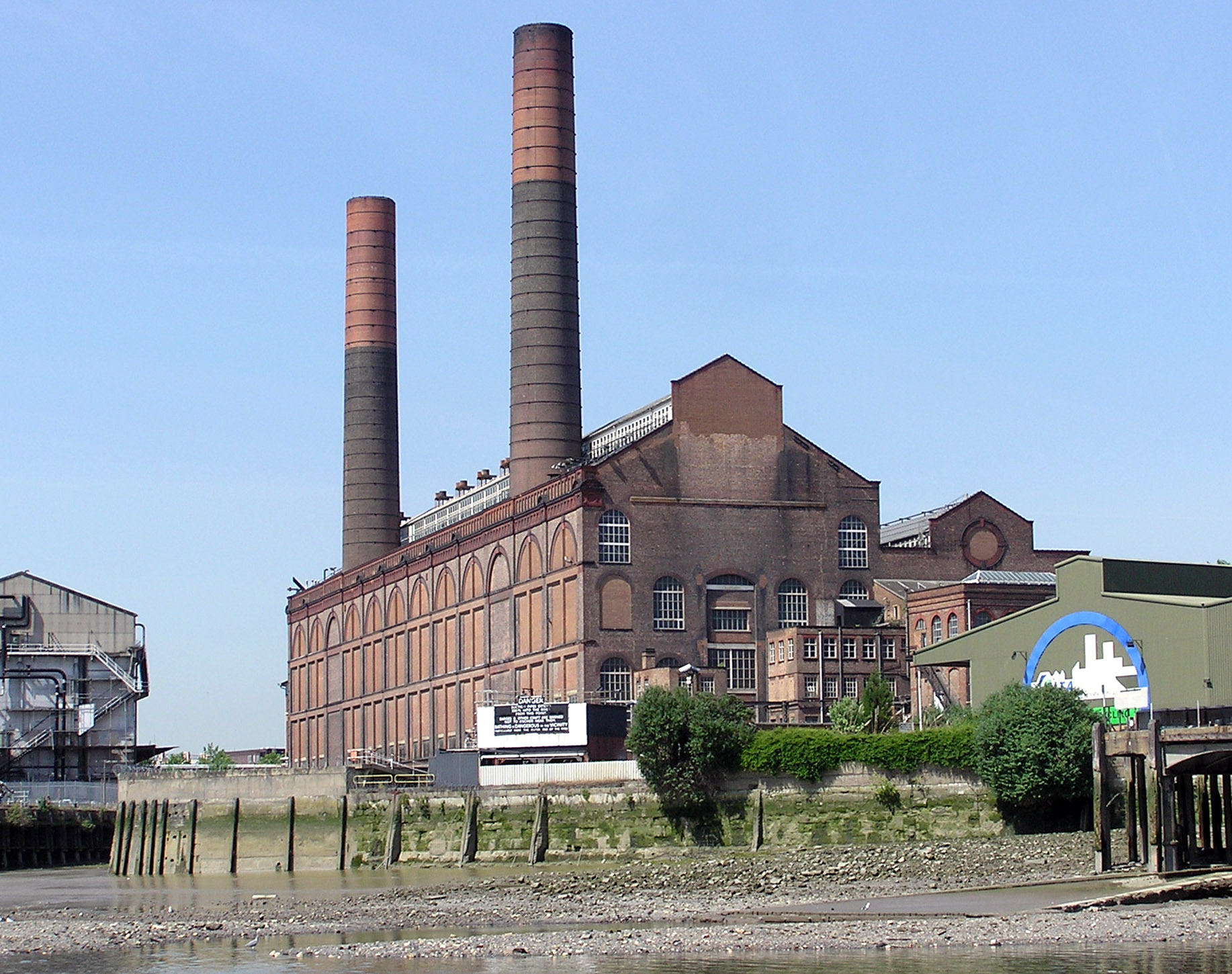
- Lots Road Power Station from the River Thames
- Country: England
- Location: Royal Borough of Kensington & Chelsea, Greater London
- Coordinates: 51.47785°N 0.18127°W
- Status: Decommissioned
- Commission date: 1905
- Decommission date: 2002

Thermal power station
- Primary fuel: Oil
- Tertiary fuel: Coal

Power generation
- Nameplate capacity: 50 MW

External links
- Commons: Related media on Commons

Lots Road Power Station is a disused gas- and oil-fired power station (originally coal) on the River Thames at Lots Road in Chelsea, London in the south-west of the Royal Borough of Kensington & Chelsea, which supplied electricity to the London Underground system. It is sometimes erroneously referred to as Fulham Power Station, a name properly applied to another former station a mile south-west along the Tideway.

== History ==
A power station at Lots Road was originally planned by the Brompton and Piccadilly Circus Railway (B&PCR, now part of the Piccadilly line) in 1897. The B&PCR was controlled by the District Railway (DR, now the District line) from 1898, and was sold in 1901 to Charles Yerkes' Metropolitan District Electric Traction Company, which built the station to provide power to the DR. The station allowed the District line trains to change from steam haulage to electric. At around the same time the Metropolitan Railway built its power station at Neasden.

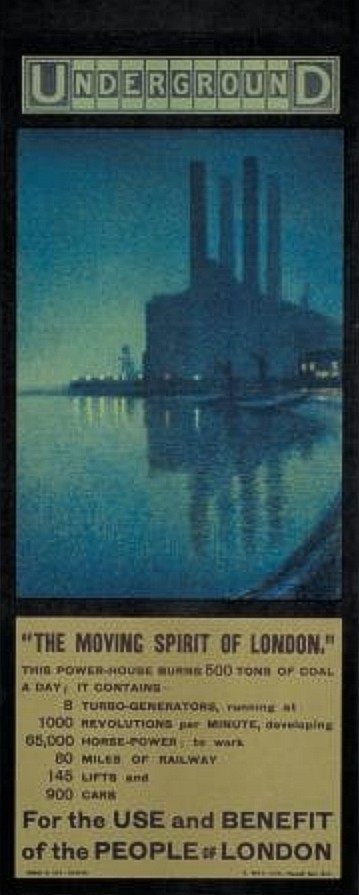
Lots Road Power station in a poster from 1910

The station was built end-on to the Thames, on the north bank of the tidal Chelsea Creek. Construction started in 1902 and was completed in December 1904, the station becoming operational on 1 February 1905. At opening the station contained 64 Babcock & Wilcox boilers producing 18,000 Ib/hr of steam which fed eight Westinghouse turbo alternators of 5,500 kW, 11,000 Volts 33 1/3 Hertz. The station burned 700 tonnes of coal a day and had a generating capacity of 55,000 kW. At the time it was claimed to be the largest power station ever built, and it eventually powered most of the railways and tramways in the Underground Group. Six of the Westinghouse turbines were replaced by Parsons turbines during 1909/10 and in 1915 an 18,000 kW set was installed from Parsons and a further 18,000 kW set in 1919. A third 18,000 kW set was ordered in 1923.

The original equipment comprised eight turbo-alternators of 6,000 kW capacity each. Three extra sets, each of 15,000 kW, were installed, the first in 1916, another in 1921, and the third in 1925. Since the latter date, three of the old 6,000-kW sets have been removed and replaced by three 15,000-kW machines. A further 15,000-kW set is now in course of erection displacing a fourth 6,000-kW set. All these sets were from C A Parsons.

The station was re-equipped and improved several times. During the early 1920s a sump and hopper system for more efficient fuel handling was installed. It was designed by The Underfeed Stoker Company and constructed under their stewardship by Peter Lind & Company, who still trade in London today.

The modernisation undertaken in the 1960s converted the station from 33 1/3 Hz to 50 Hz generation and from coal burning to heavy fuel oil. The number of chimneys was reduced from the original four to two. Between 1974 and 1977, with the discovery of natural gas in the North Sea, the boilers were converted to burn gas, with the option of oil firing if required. The station later worked in conjunction with the ex-London County Council Tramways power station at Greenwich to supply the London Underground network.

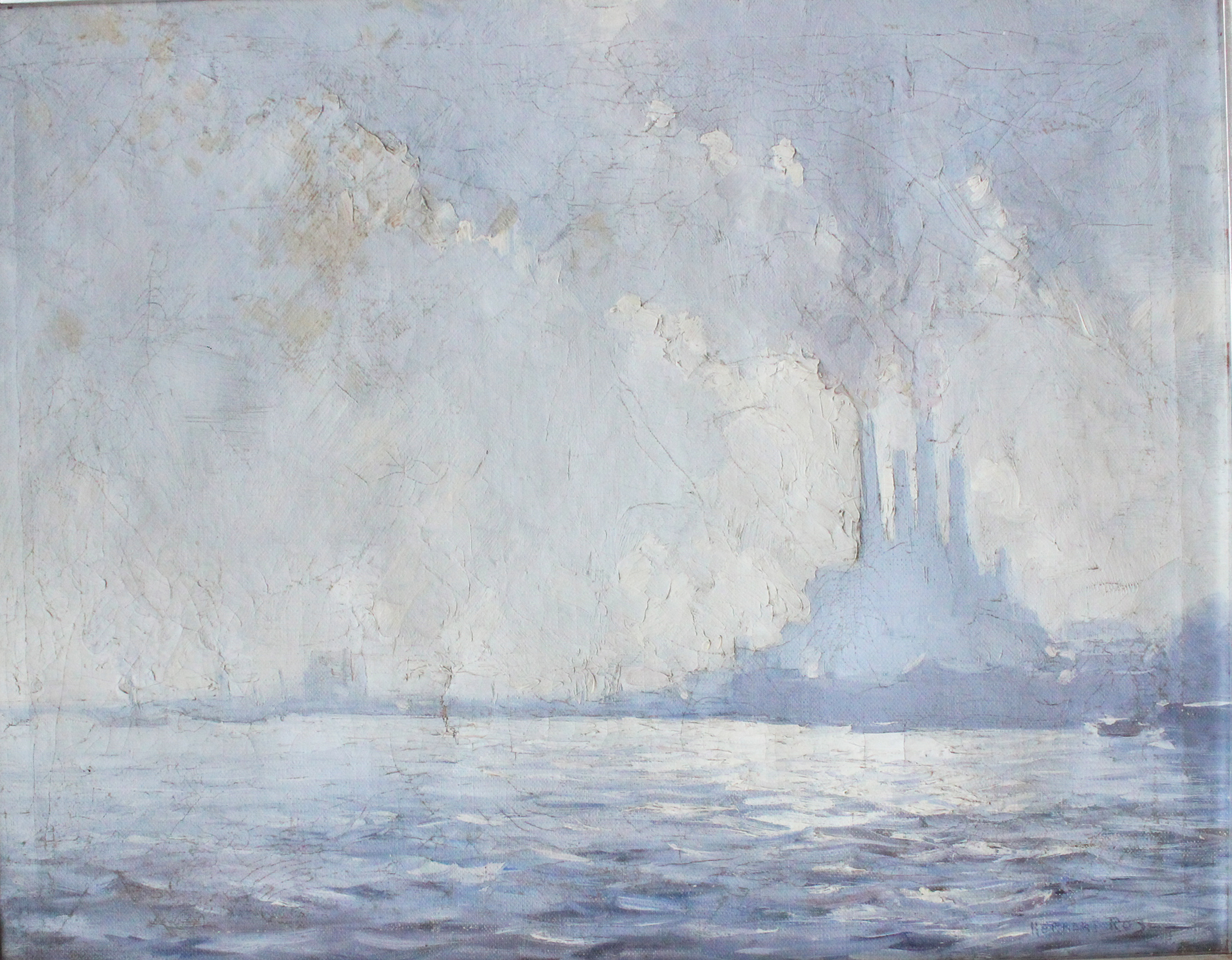
Lots Road Power Station by Herbert C. Rose (1890–1937). Oil on canvas. Adnan Ege Kutay Collection, USA.

The station played a part in the birth of commercial radio in the UK. When the first two radio stations, LBC and Capital Radio, opened in October 1973, the site for their medium wave transmitters was not complete. As a result, a temporary 'Tee' antenna was strung up between the two chimneys (transmitting LBC on 417 m (719 kHz), and Capital Radio on 539 m (557 kHz)), until the permanent site at Saffron Green was ready in 1975. From 1979 the site was used again, on 720 kHz (for a low power MW relay of BBC Radio 4's LW service) which was in use until 2001 when the radio transmitter was moved to Crystal Palace. Additionally, there were broadcasts of BBC CARFAX experimental traffic information on 526.5 kHz, 1979–1981, and Spectrum Radio on 558 kHz, 1990-2001.

In July 1992, it was decided not to re-equip Lots Road again; rather it was to continue to operate only until the machinery's life was expired. On 21 October 2002, Transport Minister John Spellar switched off the turbines, ending 97 years of electricity generation. Since 2002, all power for the London Underground has been supplied from the National Grid (except that Greenwich Power Station is kept on standby, in case of National Grid failure).

== Redevelopment ==
In 1999, London Transport sold the power station site to Circadian for £34 million. Circadian wished to convert the power station into shops, restaurants and apartments, and to construct additional buildings, including two skyscrapers, on the adjoining vacant land. The scheme was delayed because Kensington & Chelsea Council refused planning permission for one of the two towers. The other, South Tower, the taller, was granted permission by Hammersmith & Fulham Council, but the developer was unwilling to proceed without permission for both. On 30 January 2006 the Secretary of State, considering especially views of the Planning Inspector, granted planning permission for the development. In 2007 the developer hoped to complete the scheme by 2013, but it was delayed by the economic downturn.

On 13 September 2010, Thames Water announced that they would be building the Thames Tideway super sewer. One of the preferred accesses, Cremorne Wharf Foreshore, adjoins but which will end a nearby combined sewer overflow. The consultation period ended in Autumn 2010.

On 26 September 2013, developer Hutchison Whampoa Properties broke ground on the eight-acre site, rebranding it as "Chelsea Waterfront", with Mayor of London Boris Johnson speaking at the ceremony: "The £1 billion scheme will be the biggest riverside development on the north bank [of the Thames] for over 100 years, and will create 706 homes."

New planning and design details were conceived between 2010 and 2012, with construction for the first phase (100 apartments) completed by 2016, and phase two, which included the power station itself, completed by 2018.

== See also ==
- Power House, Chiswick – an earlier power station, which was replaced by Lots Road in 1917
- Greenwich Power Station – London Underground's standby power station

Preceded by Carville A Power Station	Largest Power Station in the UK; 1905–1916	Succeeded by Carville B Power Station
