= Sandford Manor House =

Building in London Borough of Hammersmith and Fulham, London, England, UK

Coordinates: 51.4788°N 0.1867°W

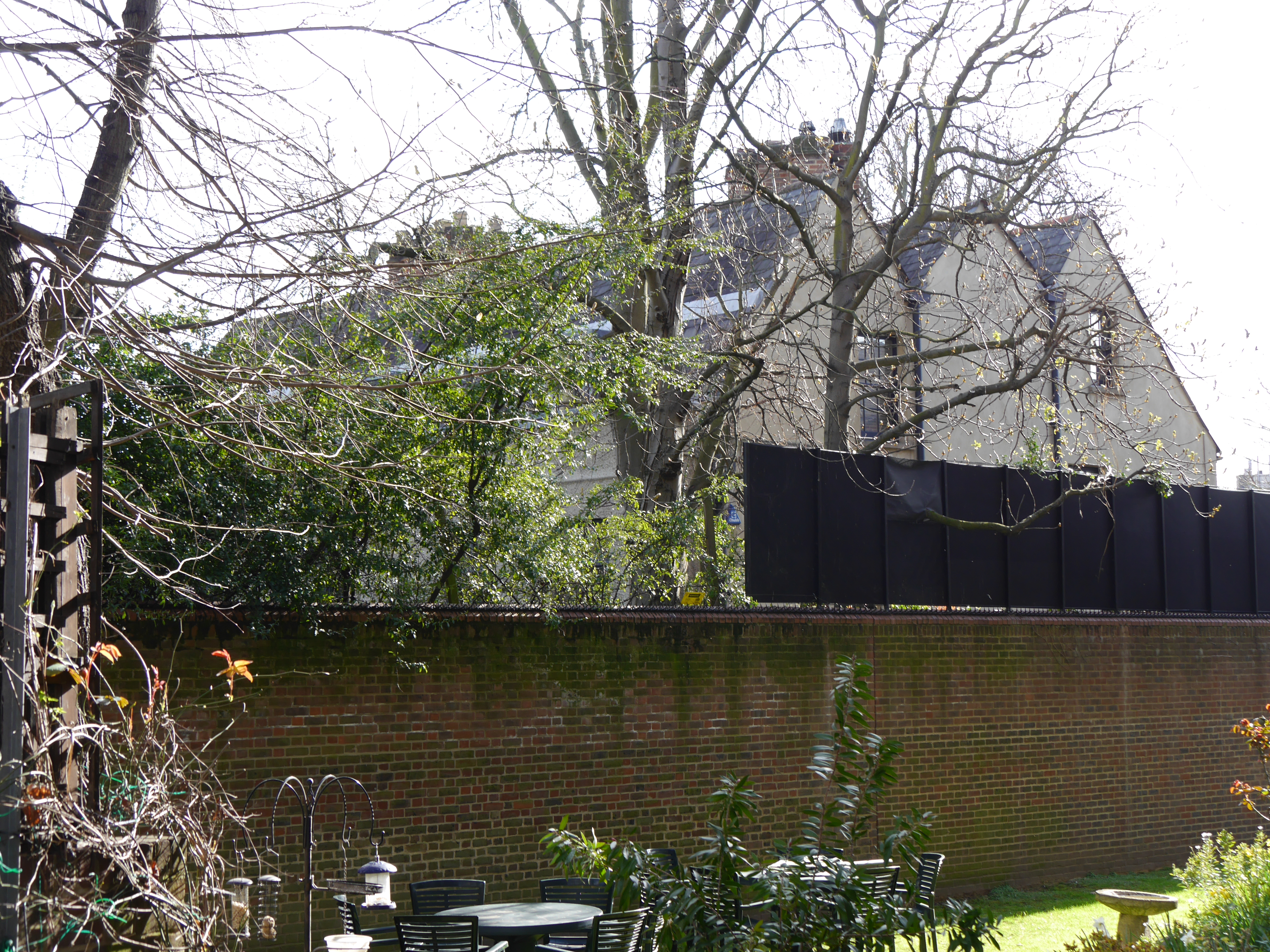
Sandford Manor House, 2015

Sandford Manor House is a Grade II* listed house in Rewell Street, Fulham, London.

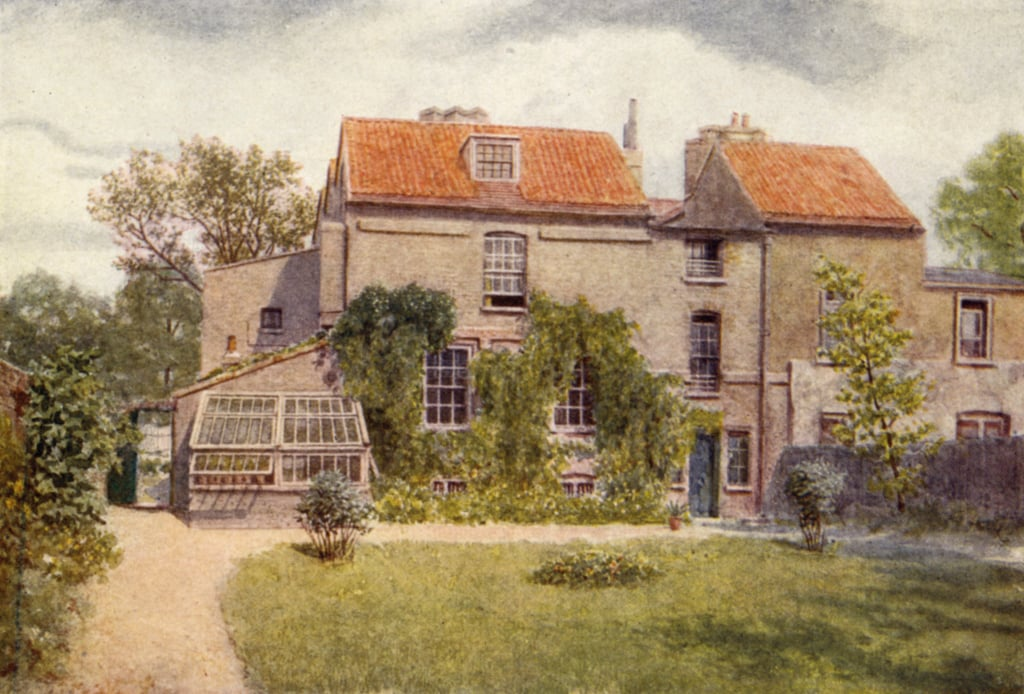
Sandford Manor House from back garden, 1898 by Philip Norman

It was probably built in the late 17th century, but with later alterations and additions. It has been converted to offices.

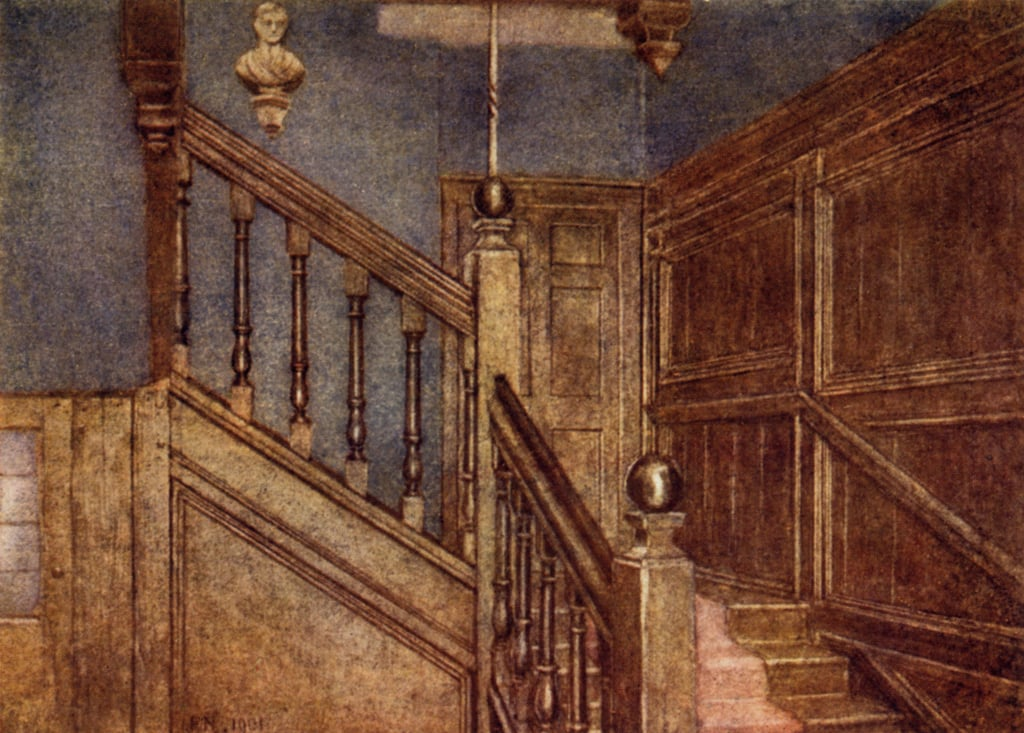
Staircase of Sandford Manor House, 1898 by Philip Norman

The house is reputed to have been the residence of Nell Gwynne, the long-time mistress of King Charles II of England.
