= Putney Pier =

Pier on the River Thames

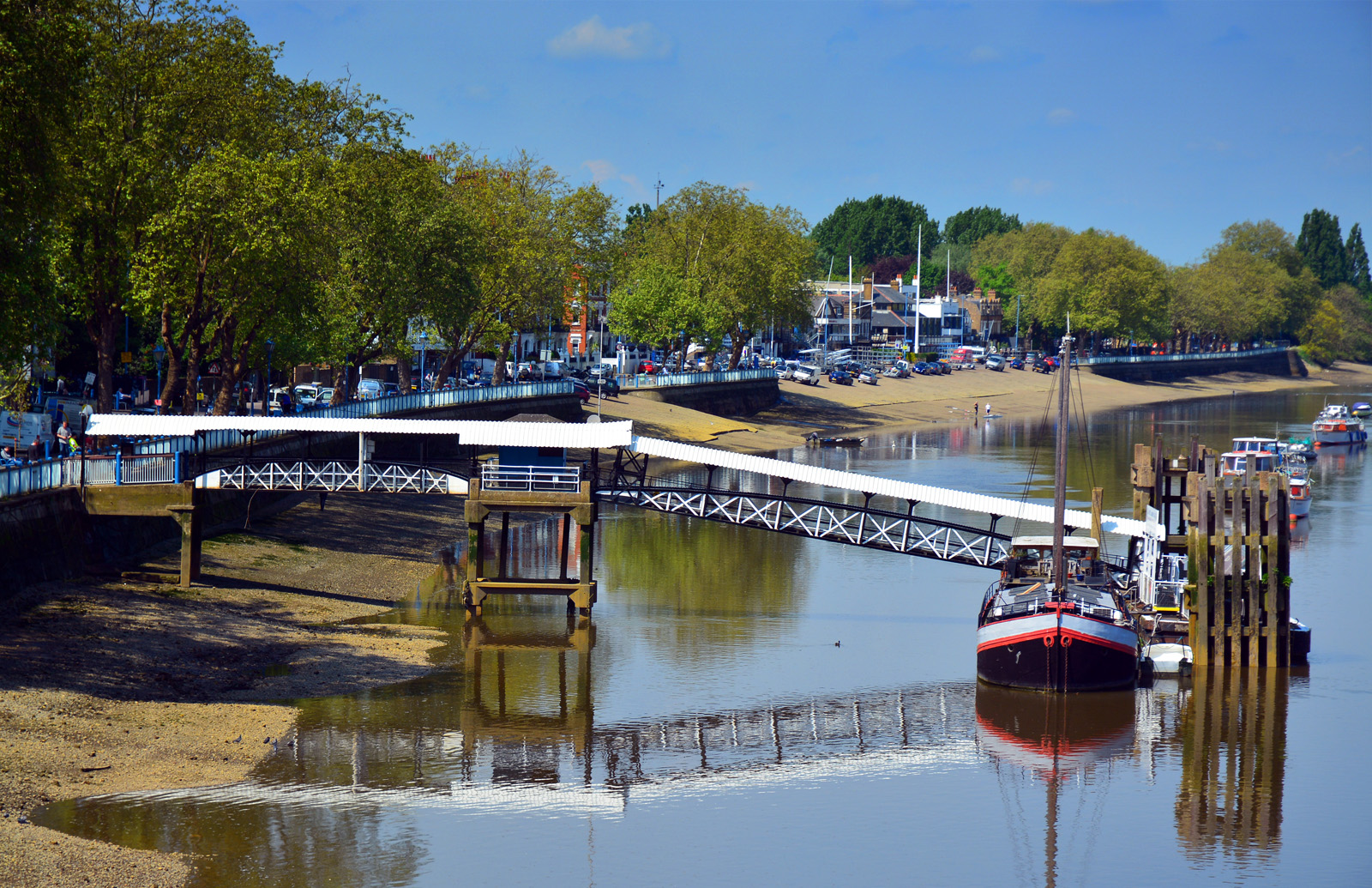
- Putney Pier from Putney Bridge
- Type: River bus services
- Location: River Thames at Putney, London, UK
- Coordinates: 51.4673°N 0.2155°W
- Owner: Livett's Launches
- Operator: Uber Boat by Thames Clippers

History
- Location within London Borough of Wandsworth

Putney Pier is a pier on the River Thames at Putney, in the London Borough of Wandsworth.

== Location ==
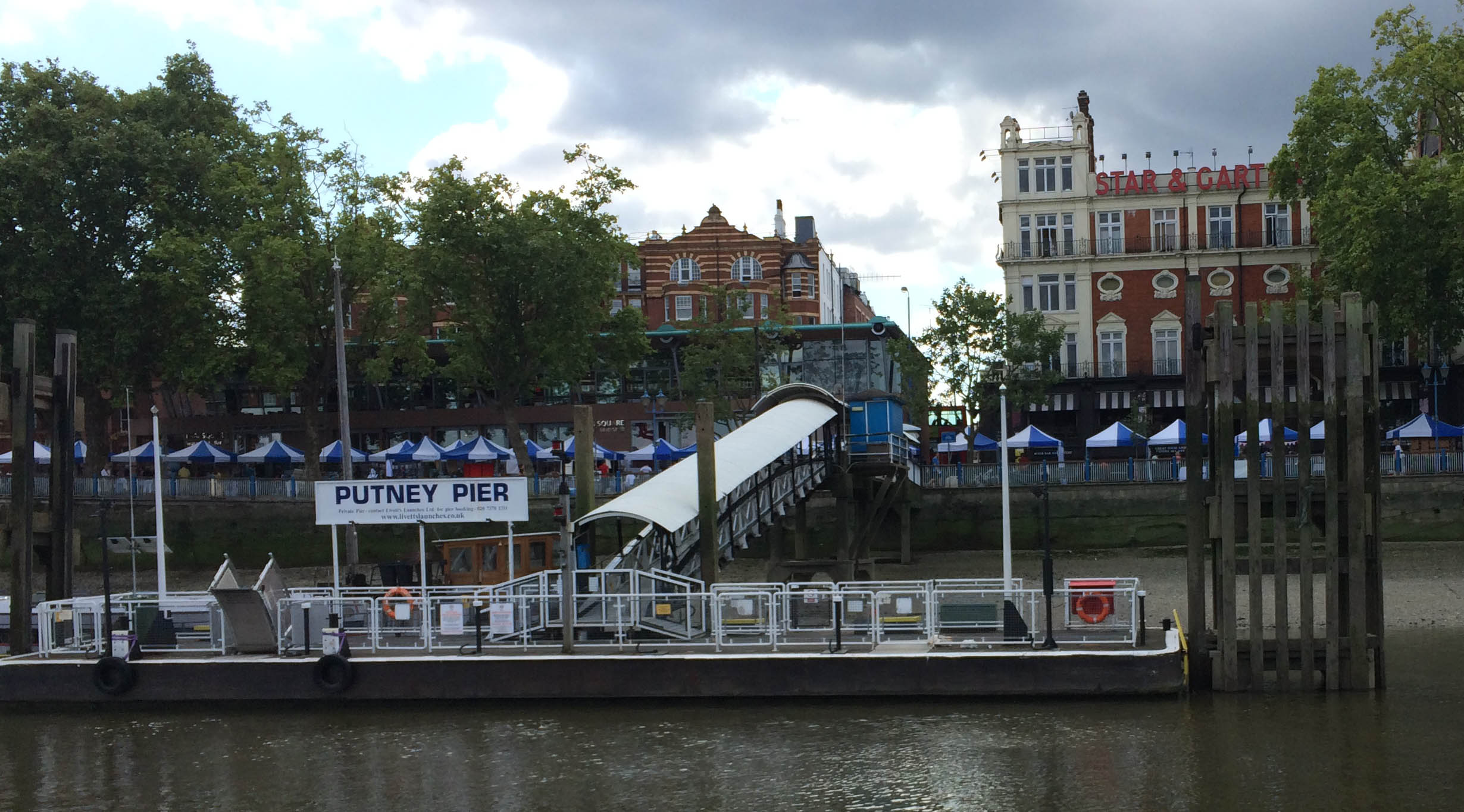
Putney Pier from Fulham

The pier is 24.94m long and is located off Putney Embankment near the Star & Garter pub and Thai Square restaurant, west of Putney Bridge on the south bank of the River Thames.

The start of the Men's and Women's University Boat Race Championship Course, and the end of various non-university races from October to March, are close to the pier.

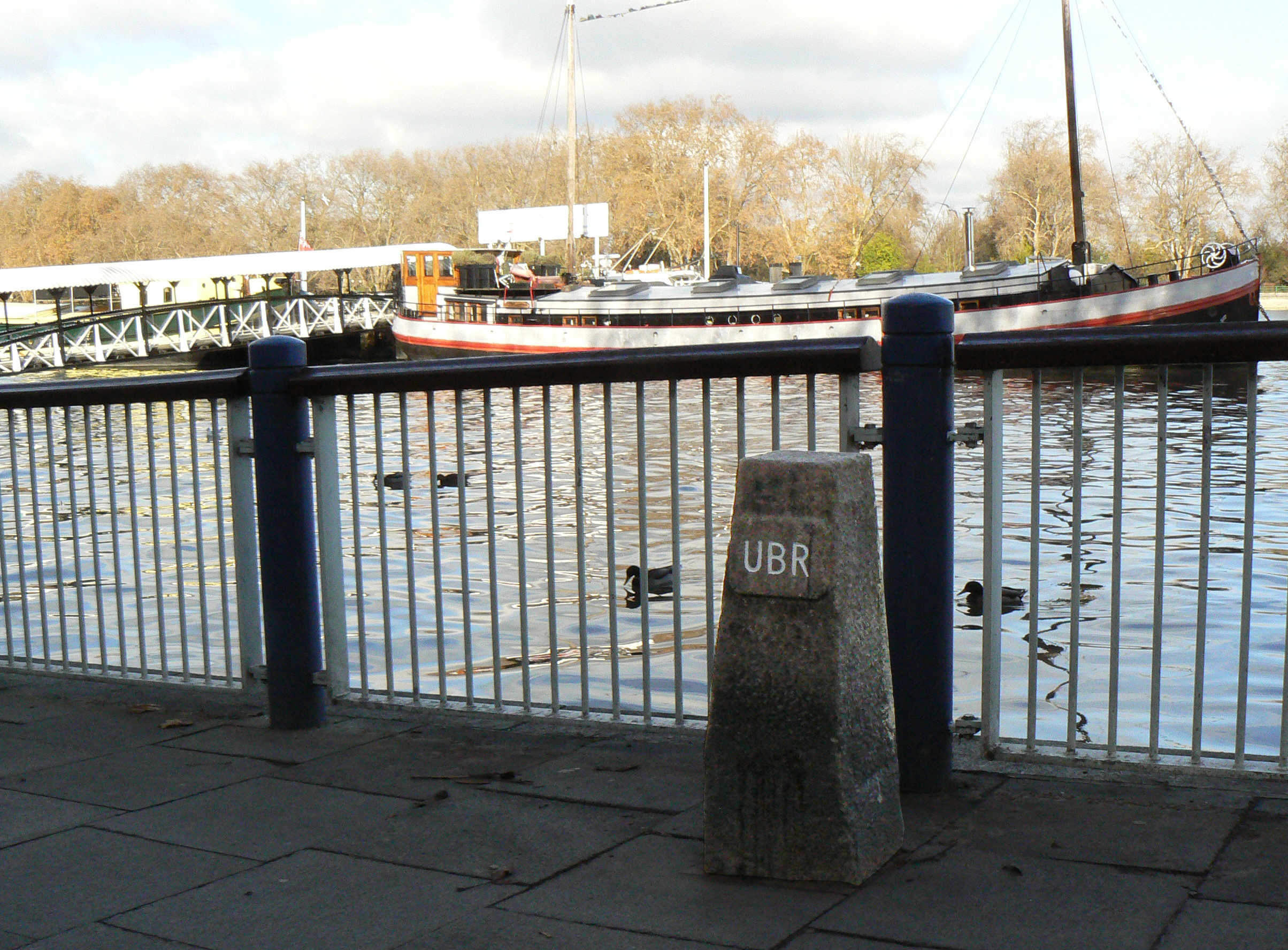
University Boat Race start stones near the pier

== History ==
The pier was built in the late 19th century and has a lattice ironwork gangway.

Livett's Launches own and manage the pier, in 2013 there was concern in the local rowing community about their redevelopment of the pier.

The Tideway Tunnel's Putney Embankment Foreshore access site is close to the pier and is expected to be closed by 2025, leaving a viewing platform for the boat races.

== Public services ==
The RB6 operated by Uber Boat by Thames Clippers runs a commuter service from the Pier at peak times on weekdays, while since Summer 2023 the RB2 service has served the pier hourly on weekends. The pier has two ticket readers for contactless or oyster card payment.

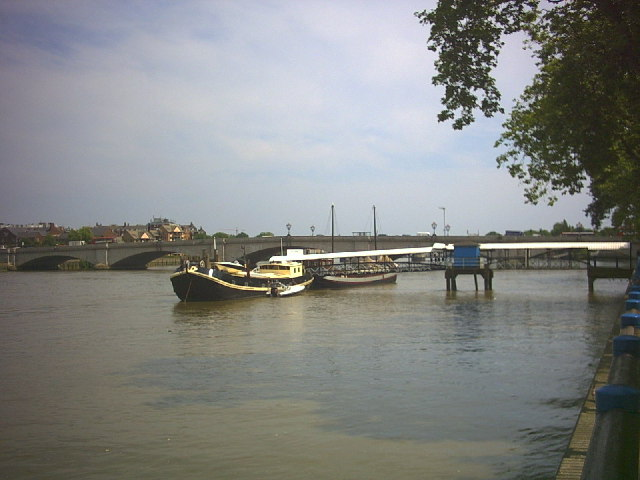
Putney Pier from Putney Embankment

== Private services ==
Viscount Cruises, Thames Luxury Charters, and Capital Pleasure Boats offer private charters from Putney Pier.

== Connections to other public transport ==
The pier is served by Transport for London buses 22, 265, 378 and 485 which stop at the Putney Pier stop on the Lower Richmond Road. Putney Bridge tube station (District line) is a 7-minute walk over the bridge, Putney railway station (Southwestern Railway) is a 13-minute walk. The Putney pier Santander Cycles docking station is a 1-minute walk across the Lower Richmond road.

Preceding station	London River Services	Following station
Terminus	RB6	Wandsworth Riverside Quarter Pier towards Barking Riverside Pier
