= London Bridge City Pier =

Pier on the River Thames

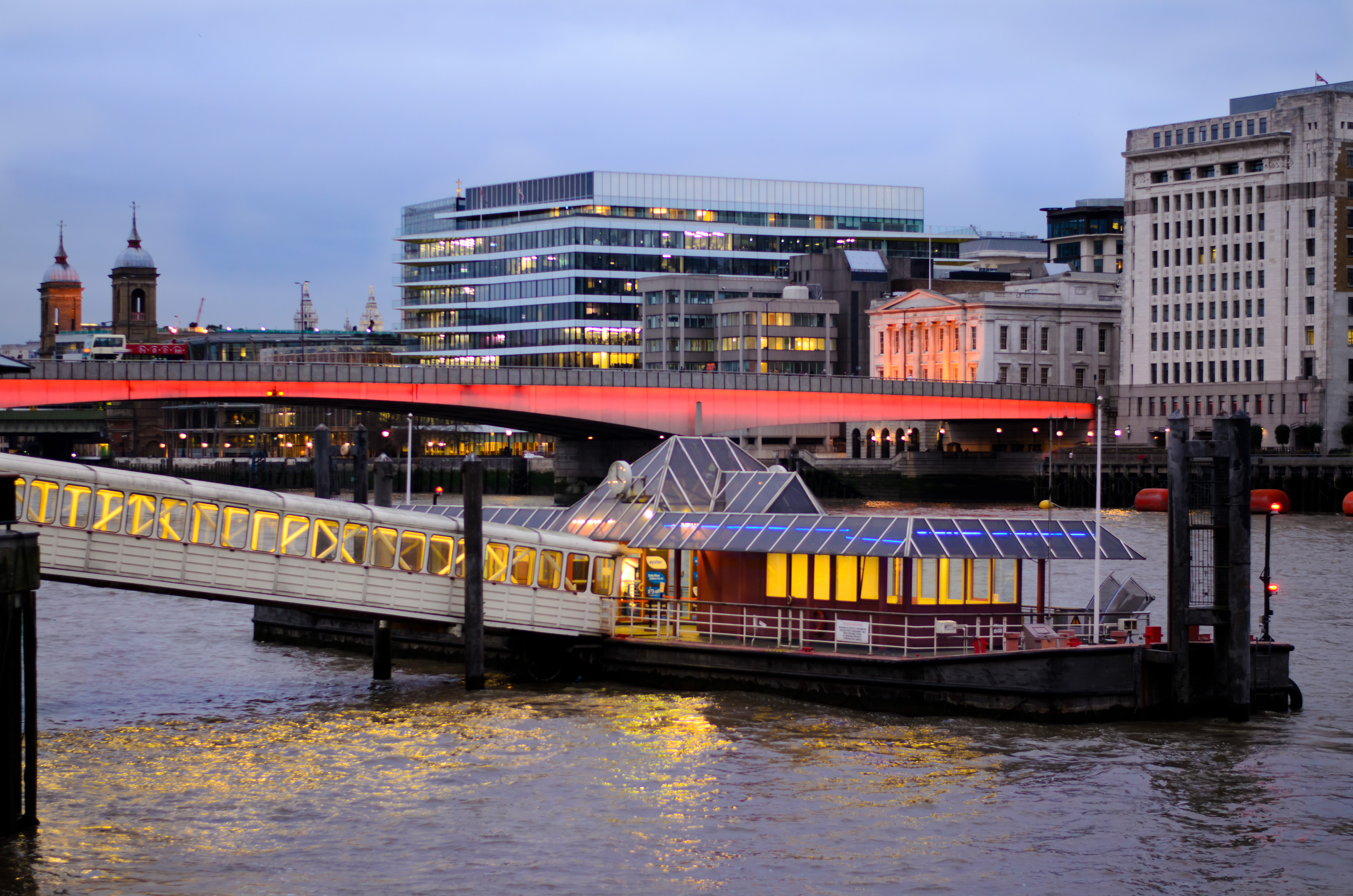
- London Bridge City Pier
- Type: River bus and tourist/leisure services
- Location: River Thames, London, England
- Coordinates: 51.506903°N 0.084683°W
- Owner: London River Services
- Operator: Uber Boat by Thames Clippers

History
- Location within Central London

London Bridge City Pier (also known as London Bridge Pier and London City Pier) is situated on the south bank of the River Thames in London, UK, close to London Bridge. It serves as the main pier for the City of London and City Hall, former headquarters of the London Assembly.

The pier is also close to Hay's Galleria, HMS Belfast, Borough Market and the Shard.

== Services ==
London Bridge City Pier is served by the River Thames commuter catamaran service run by Uber Boat by Thames Clippers. Boats run regularly from Embankment and the London Eye, and on to Tower Millennium Pier, Canary Wharf, The O_{2} and Barking Riverside Pier.

== Connections ==
- London Bridge station
- London Bridge bus station

== Gallery ==
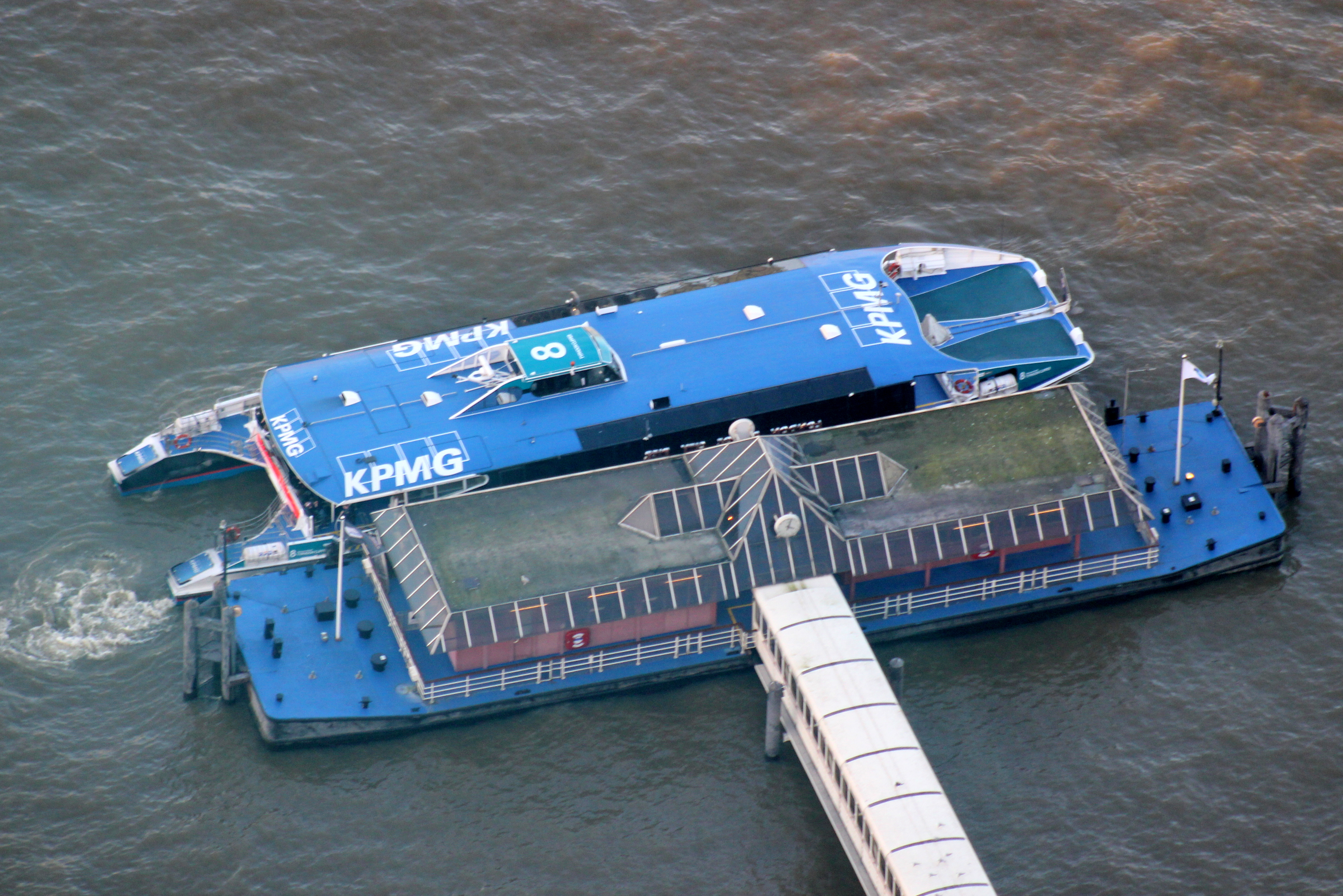

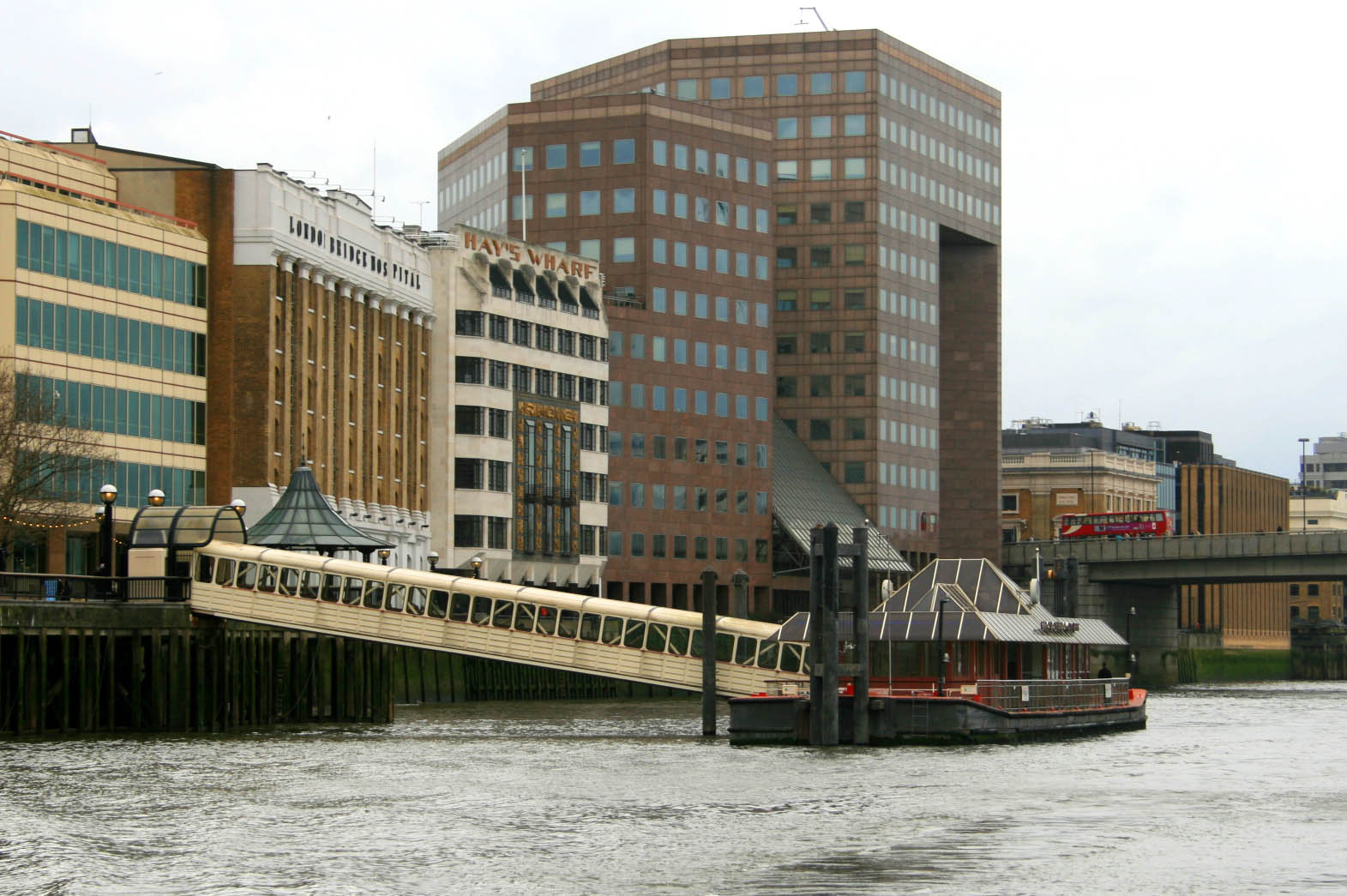

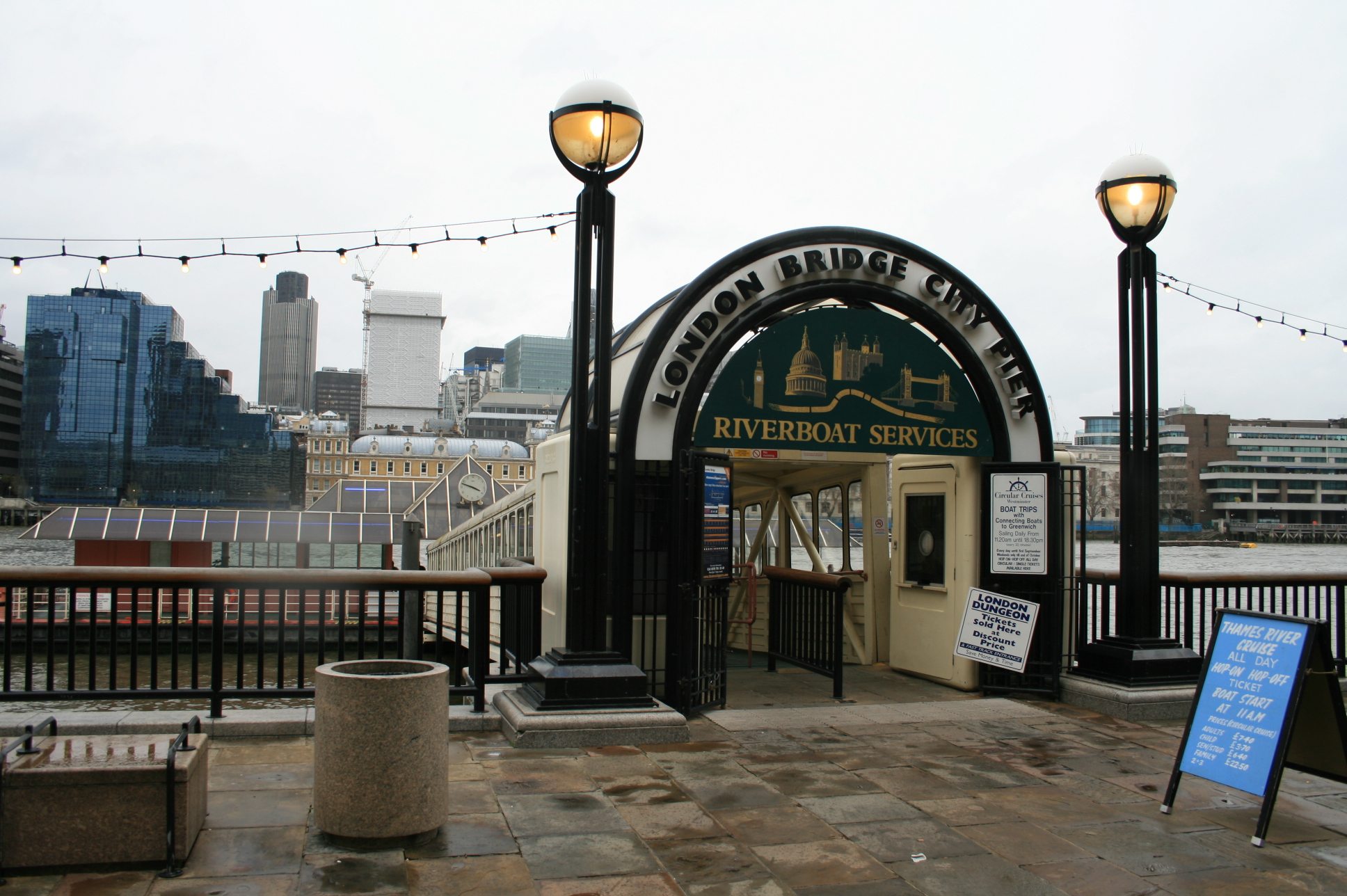

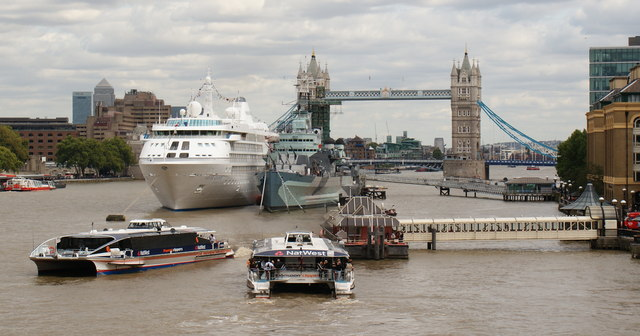

| Preceding station | London River Services | Following station |
|---|---|---|
| Bankside Pier towards Battersea Power Station Pier | RB1 | Tower Millennium Pier towards Barking Riverside Pier |
| Bankside Pier towards Putney Pier | RB6 | Tower Millennium Pier towards Barking Riverside Pier |
| Bankside Pier towards Westminster Millennium Pier | Westminster to St Katharine's Circular | Tower Bridge Quay towards Westminster Millennium Pier |
