= Festival Pier =

Pier on the River Thames near the South Bank Centre

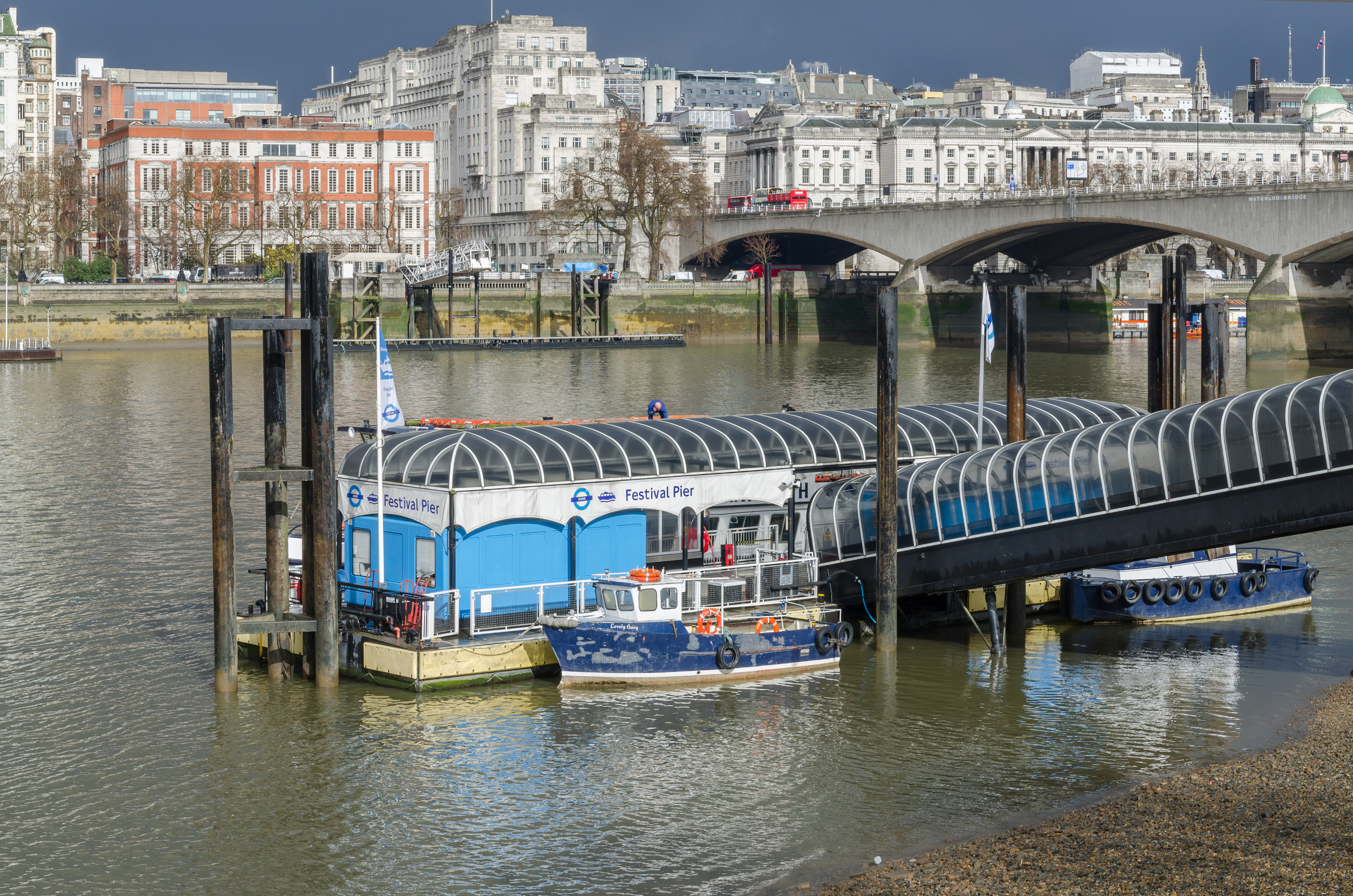
- Festival Pier in March 2014.
- Type: Tourist/leisure services
- Location: River Thames, London, UK
- Coordinates: 51°30′24″N 0°07′02″W
- Owner: London River Services
- Operator: London River Services

History
- Location within Central London

Festival Pier is a stop for river boat services on the River Thames, London, UK. It is immediately in front of the Royal Festival Hall and National Film Theatre, and serves the South Bank complex. The pier is owned and operated by London River Services, part of Transport for London.

== Services ==
The pier is used for summer leisure cruises between Westminster and Tower Bridge Quay operated by Crown River Cruises.

A High Speed RIB service also runs from this pier between March and November operated by Rib Tours London.

== Accident ==
On 21 May 1991, the central section of Festival Pier collapsed. There were no injuries, but the pier was closed for several months for repair.

== Local attractions ==
- London Eye
- London Aquarium
- Dali Universe
- Florence Nightingale Museum
- Big Ben
- South Bank arts precinct
- Crown River Cruises
- Rib Tours London

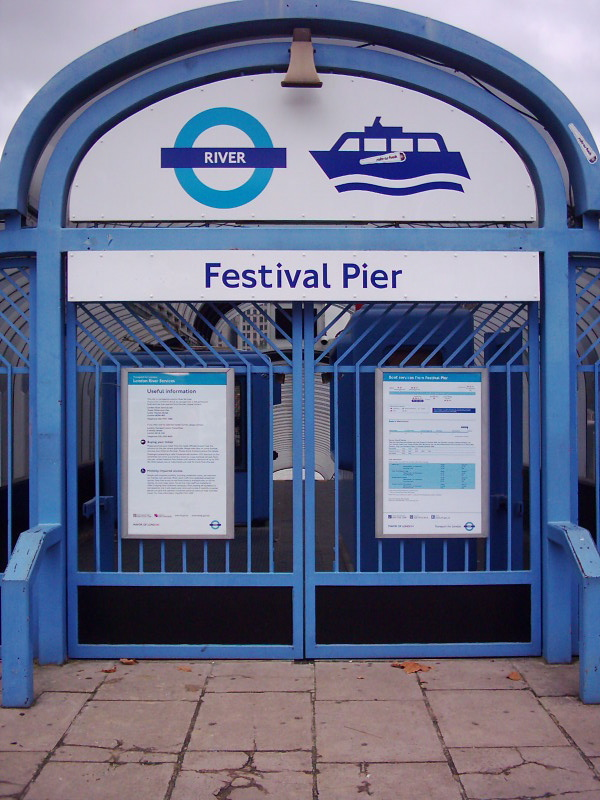
Festival Pier entrance

== Lines ==
Preceding station	London River Services	Following station
Embankment Pier towards Westminster Millennium Pier	Westminster to St Katharine's Circular	Bankside Pier towards Westminster Millennium Pier
