= Tower Millennium Pier =

Pier on the River Thames in London, England

Tower Pier
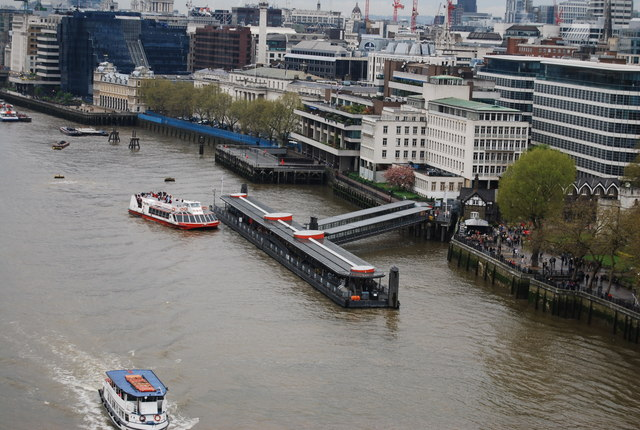
- Type: River bus and tourist/leisure services
- Location: River Thames, London, England
- Coordinates: 51.507367°N 0.079182°W
- Owner: London River Services
- Operator: Uber Boat by Thames Clippers

History
- Opening date: 14 July 2000
- Location within Central London

Tower Pier is a pier on the River Thames, in Tower Hill, London, England and is located in the London Borough of Tower Hamlets. It is operated by Uber Boat by Thames Clippers and served by various river transport and cruise operators. The pier is close to Tower Bridge and is situated in the immediately adjacent to the southwest corner of the Tower of London.

== History ==
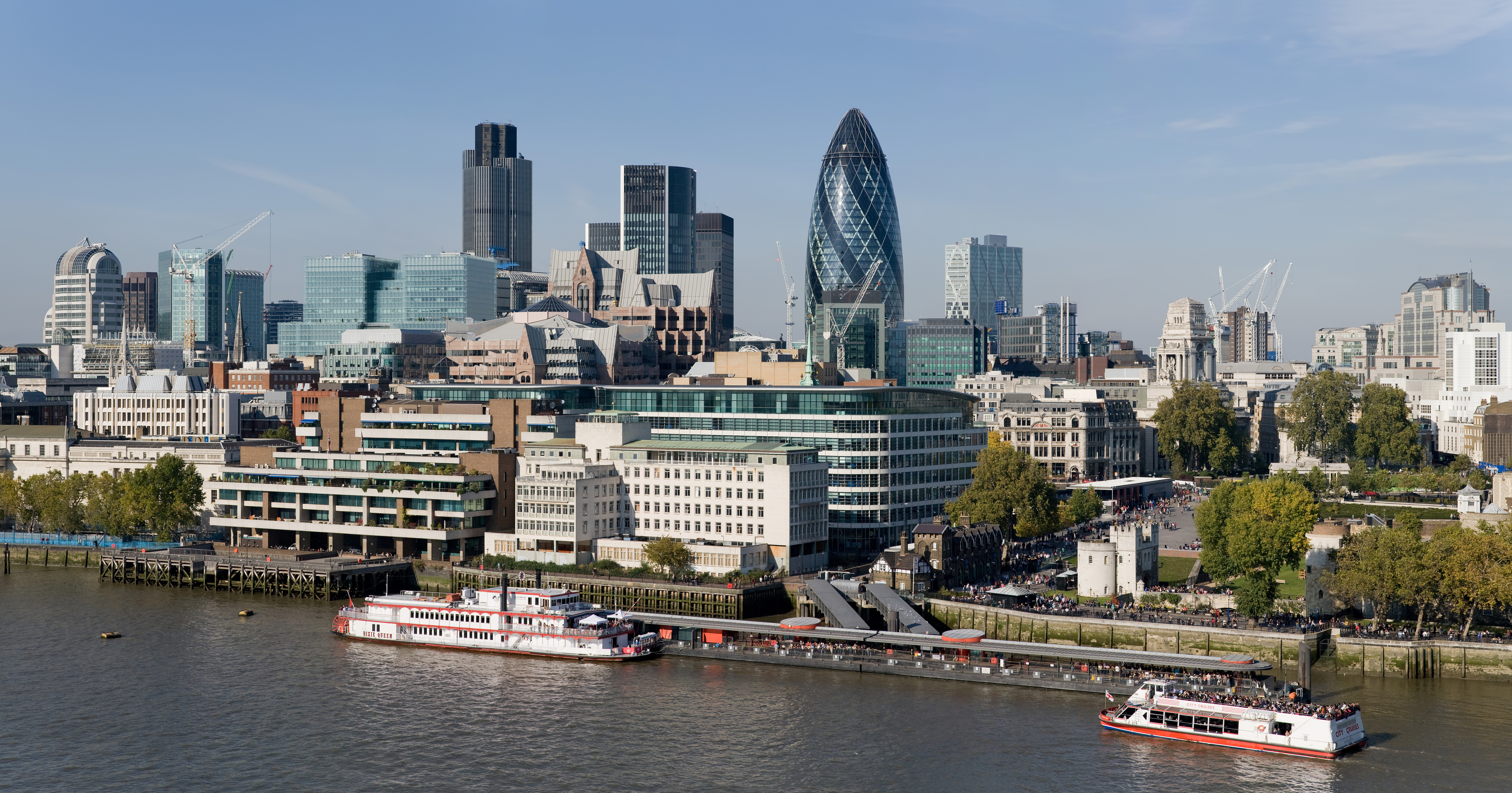
Tower Millennium Pier, with the City of London's financial core behind, as seen from City Hall

Tower Millennium Pier was opened on 14 July 2000 by London Mayor Ken Livingstone. It was funded by the Millennium Commission as part of the Thames 2000 project, and was one of five new piers provided by the Commission on the Thames (the others being Blackfriars Millennium Pier, London Eye Pier, Westminster Millennium Pier and Millbank Millennium Pier).

The pier has at its upstream end a small cruise terminal facility which is used for processing passengers and baggage transferred by boat from cruise ships berthed alongside HMS Belfast. The Tower Pier project was part of an integrated transport and regeneration strategy for the Thames led by London's Cross River Partnership.

== Services ==
The pier is used by the river bus route RB1 from Battersea Power Station to Barking Riverside (operated by Uber Boat by Thames Clippers) and Westminster-Greenwich tourist boats (operated by City Cruises). Private-charter entertainment boats also use Tower Pier.

== Connections ==
- Tower Hill tube station and Tower Gateway DLR station, Fenchurch Street railway station
- Tower Bridge Quay on the other side of Tower Bridge for Crown River Cruises
- London Buses routes 15 and N15

== Lifeboat pier move ==
In 2002 the Royal National Lifeboat Institution's Thames lifeboat service was introduced to the River Thames following the Marchioness disaster, and Tower Pier was initially used as a base for the lifeboat service. In 2006 the RNLI station moved up-river to a new base, the former Waterloo Police Pier on Victoria Embankment next to Waterloo Bridge, which took the name Tower Lifeboat Station.

== Images ==
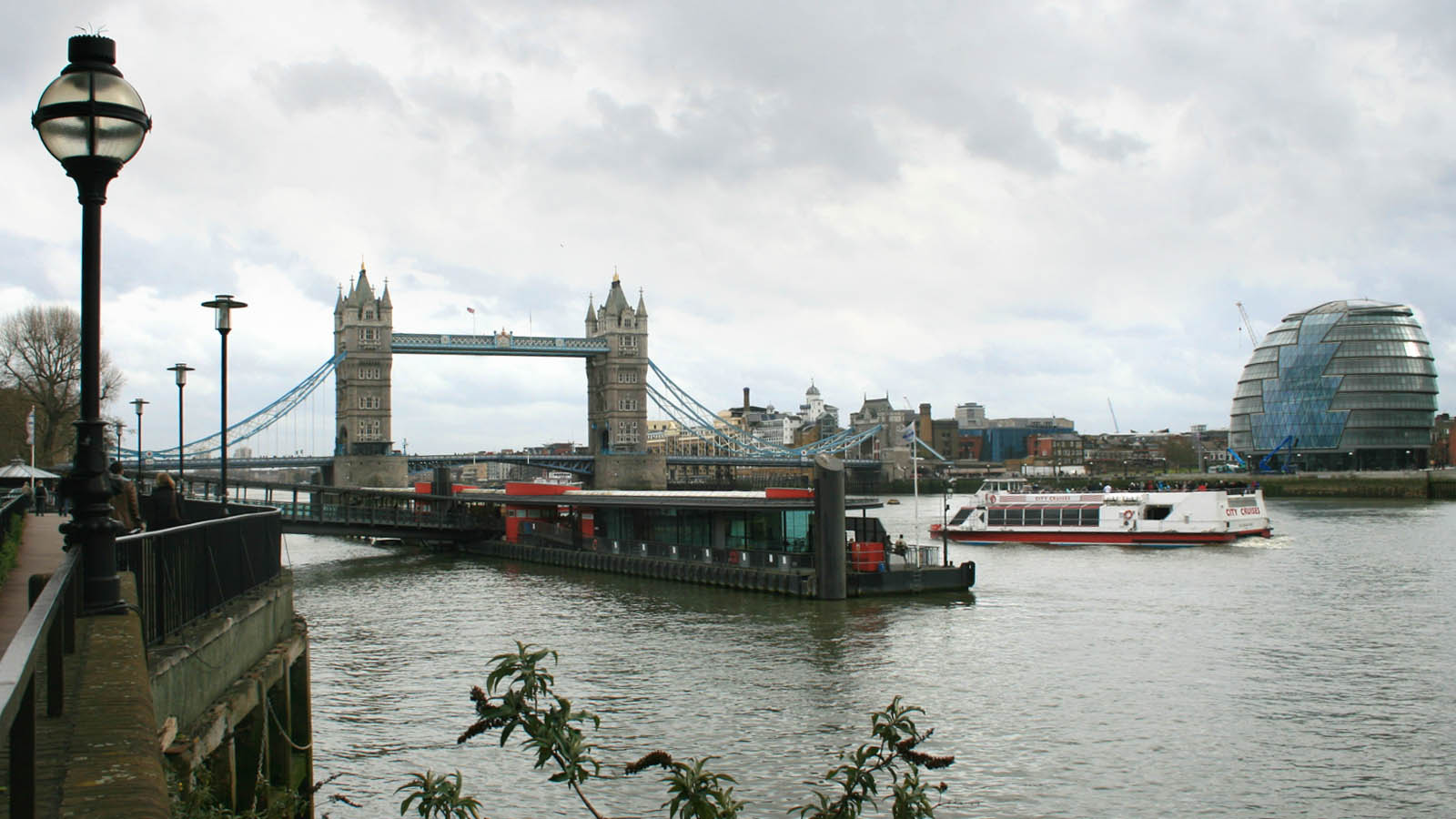
Tower Pier with Tower Bridge

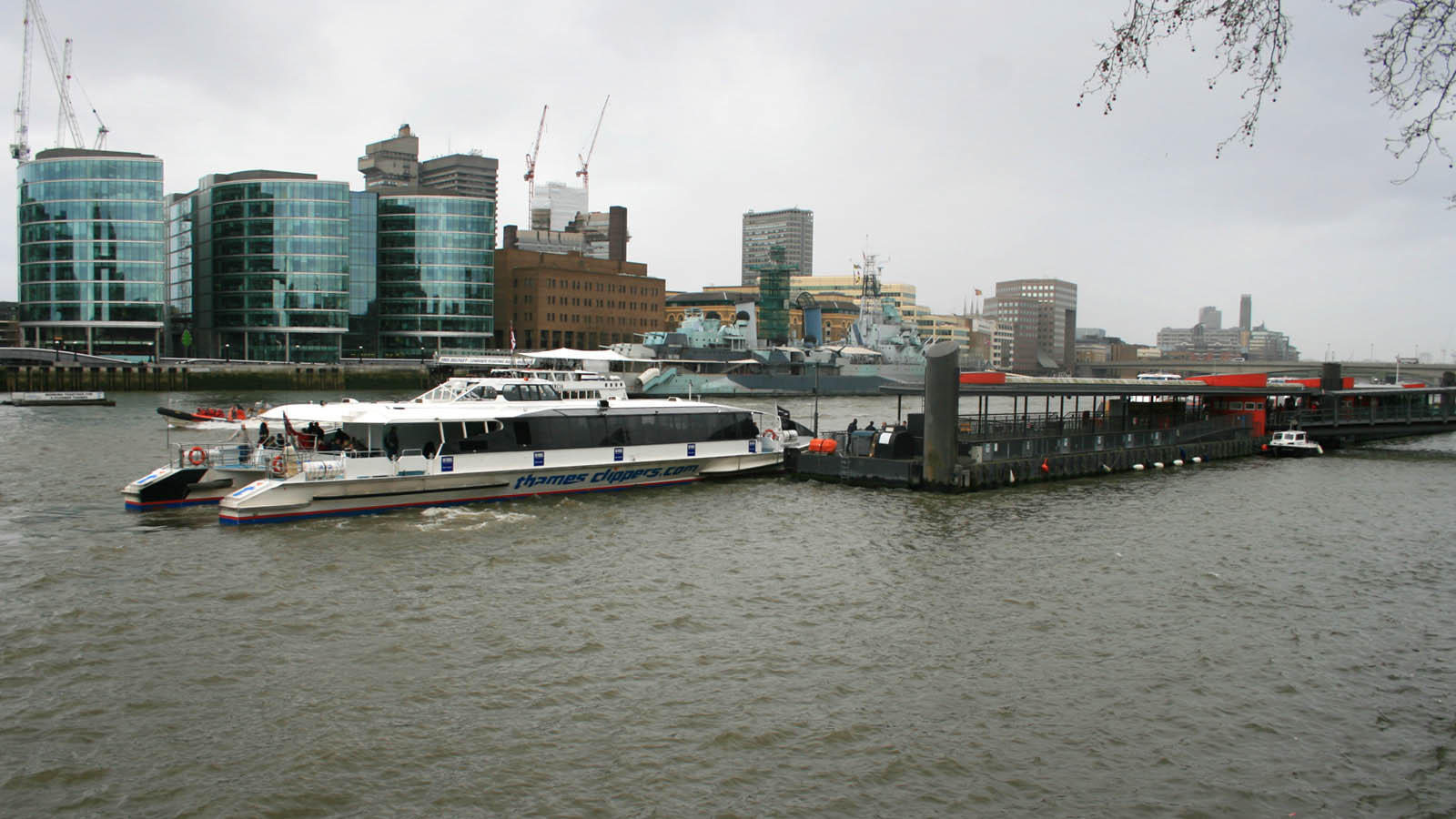
A catamaran arriving at Tower Pier

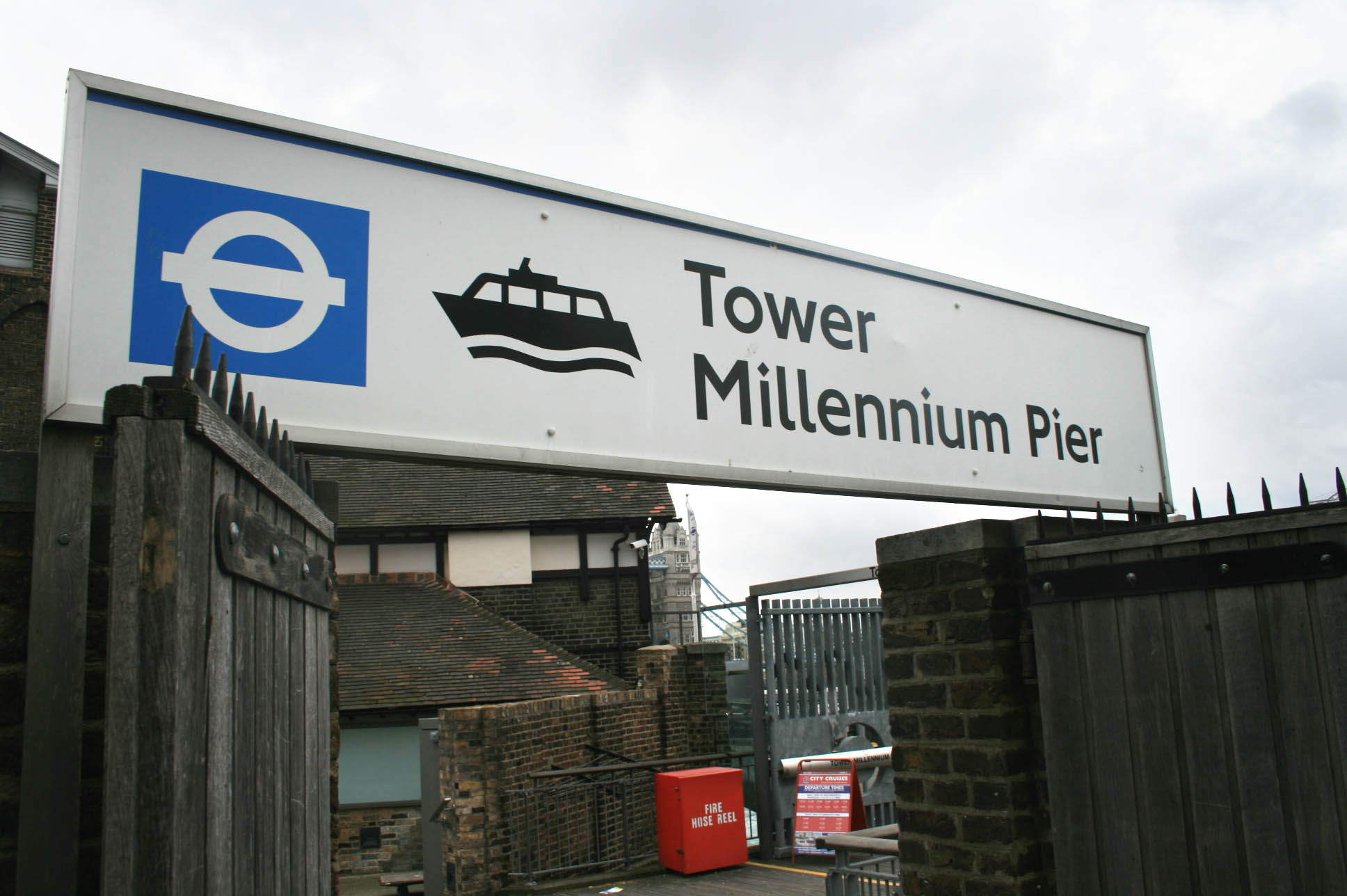
The pier entrance

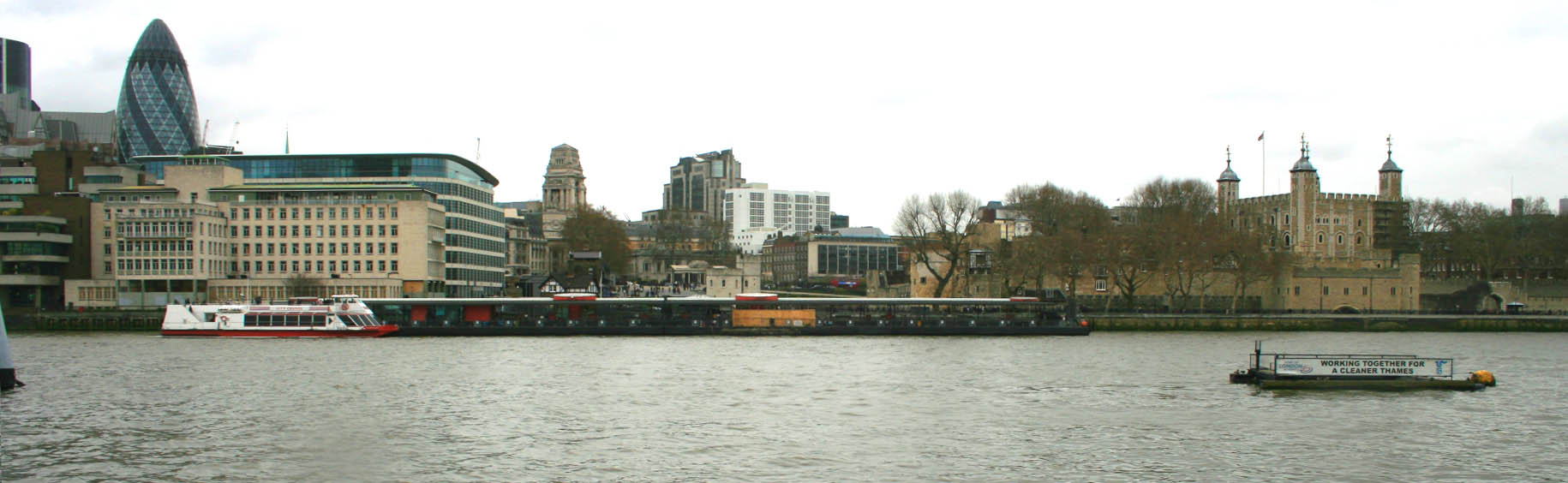
The pier with the Tower of London on the right

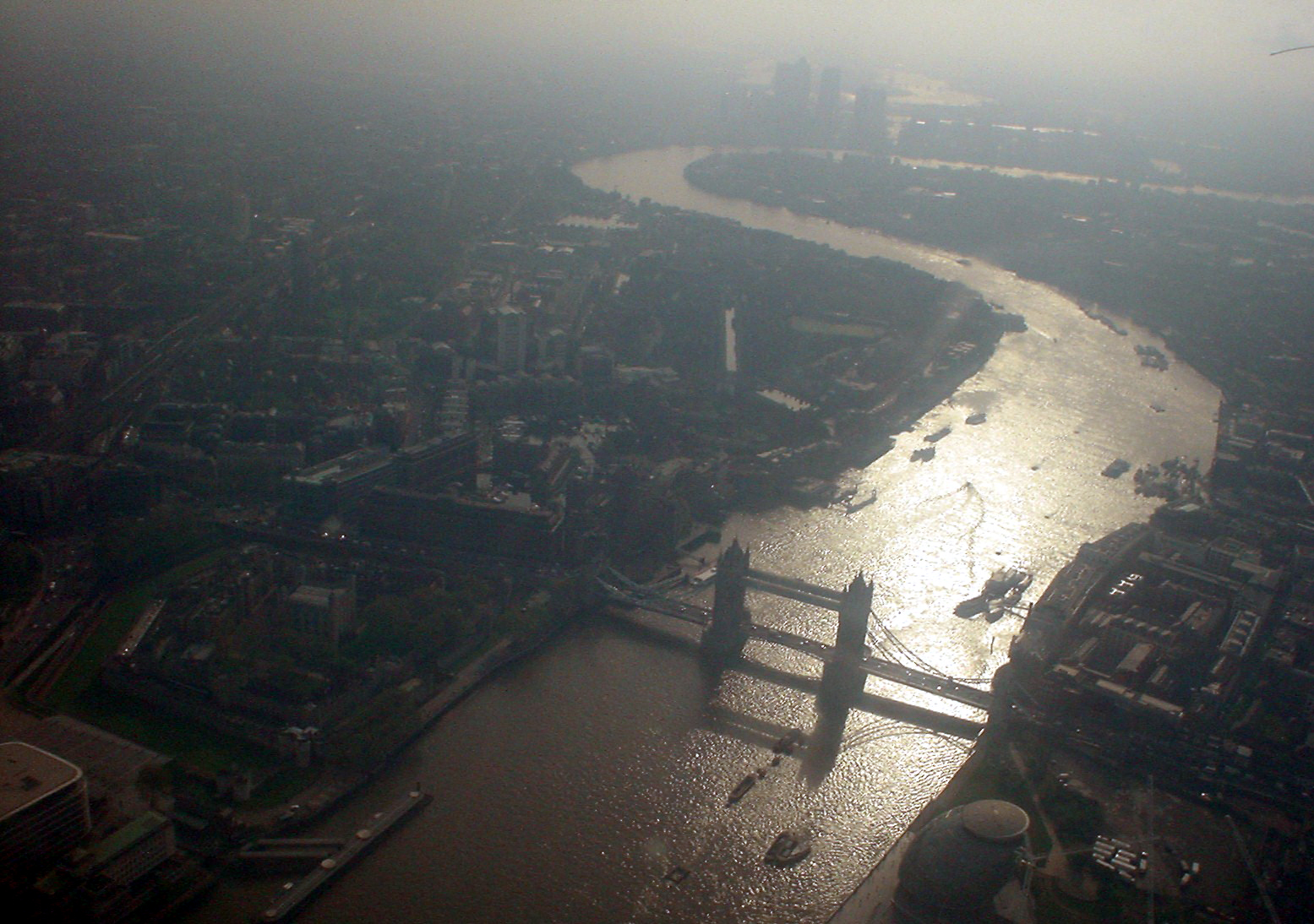
The pier and Tower Bridge seen from the air

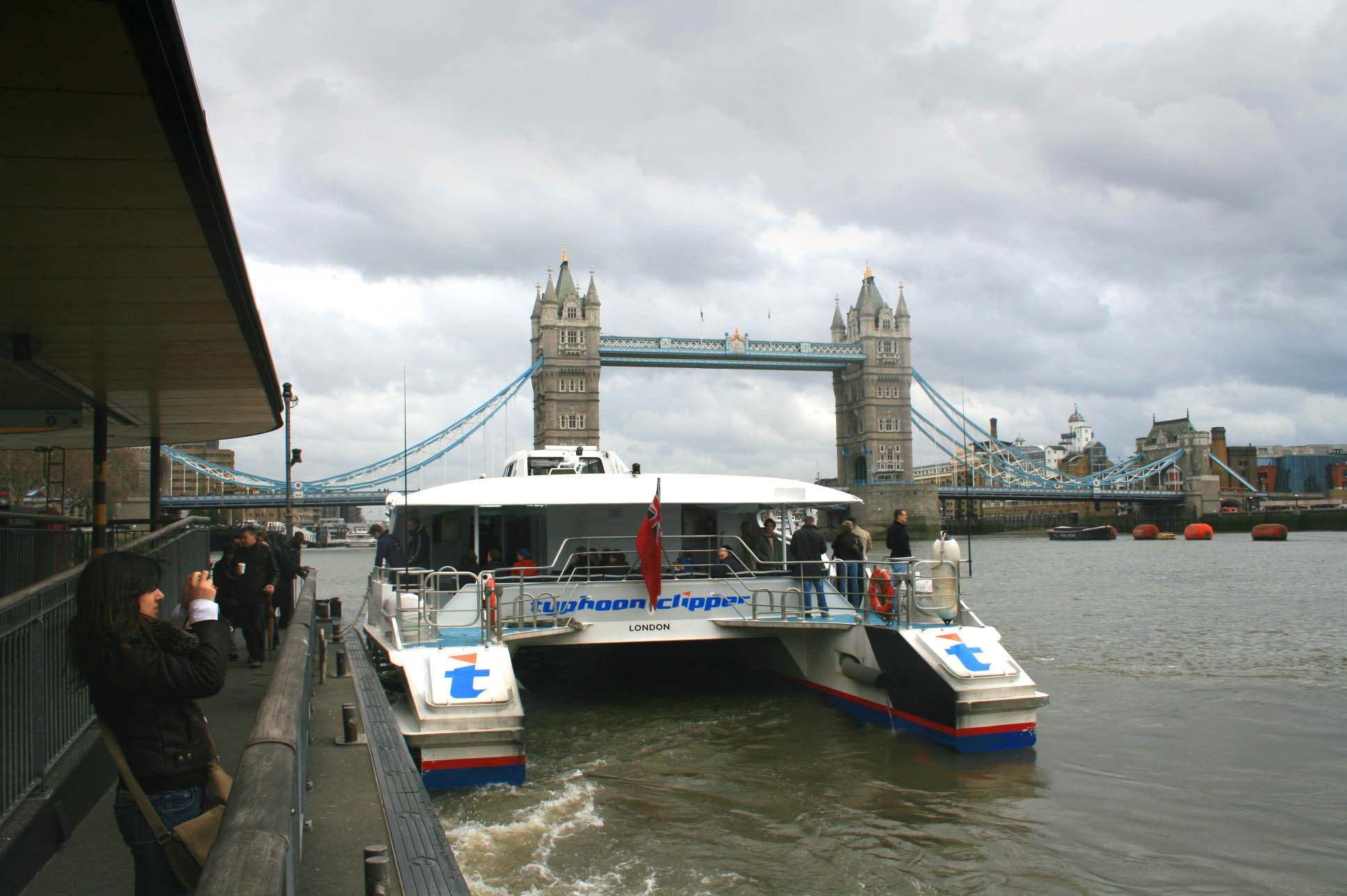
A catamaran berthed at the pier

== Lines ==
Preceding station	London River Services	Following station
London Bridge City Pier towards Battersea Power Station Pier	RB1	Canary Wharf Pier towards Barking Riverside Pier
London Bridge City Pier towards Putney Pier	RB6	Canary Wharf Pier towards Barking Riverside Pier
London Eye Pier towards Westminster Millennium Pier	Westminster to Greenwich Express Service	Greenwich Pier Terminus
