= Embankment Pier =

Pier on the River Thames near Embankment

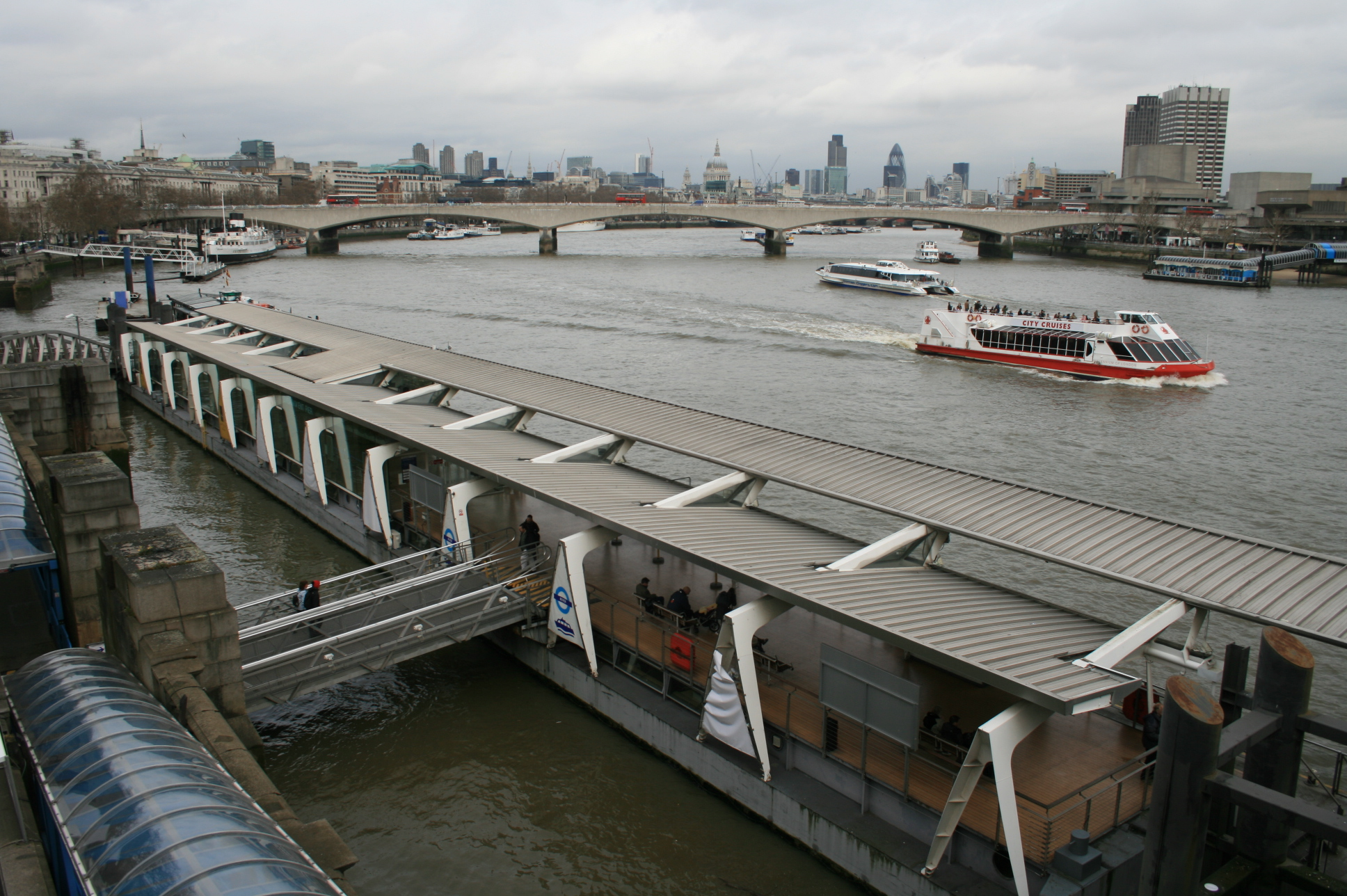
- The Pier on the River Thames
- Type: River bus and tourist/leisure services
- Location: River Thames, London, UK
- Coordinates: 51.5073°N 0.121193°W
- Owner: London River Services
- Operator: Uber Boat by Thames Clippers

History
- Location within Central London

Embankment Pier is a pier on the River Thames in City of Westminster, London. It is located on the north bank of the river, immediately next to the Hungerford Bridge and directly outside the river entrance to Embankment Underground station. It is also conveniently close to Charing Cross railway station.

== Services ==
The Embankment Pier is a departure point for the Thames River Sightseeing cruise, which operates between Westminster Pier and Greenwich Pier.

Boat services go east (downriver) to Tower Bridge Quay for exploring the Tower of London, Tower Bridge and St Katharine Docks before continuing to Greenwich Pier and then returning.

The pier is operated by Uber Boat by Thames Clippers and has ticket booths for both Thames River Sightseeing and Thames Clippers.

== Interchanges ==
- Embankment tube station
- Charing Cross railway station
- Festival Pier and London Eye Pier (over the Hungerford Bridge)

== Local attractions ==
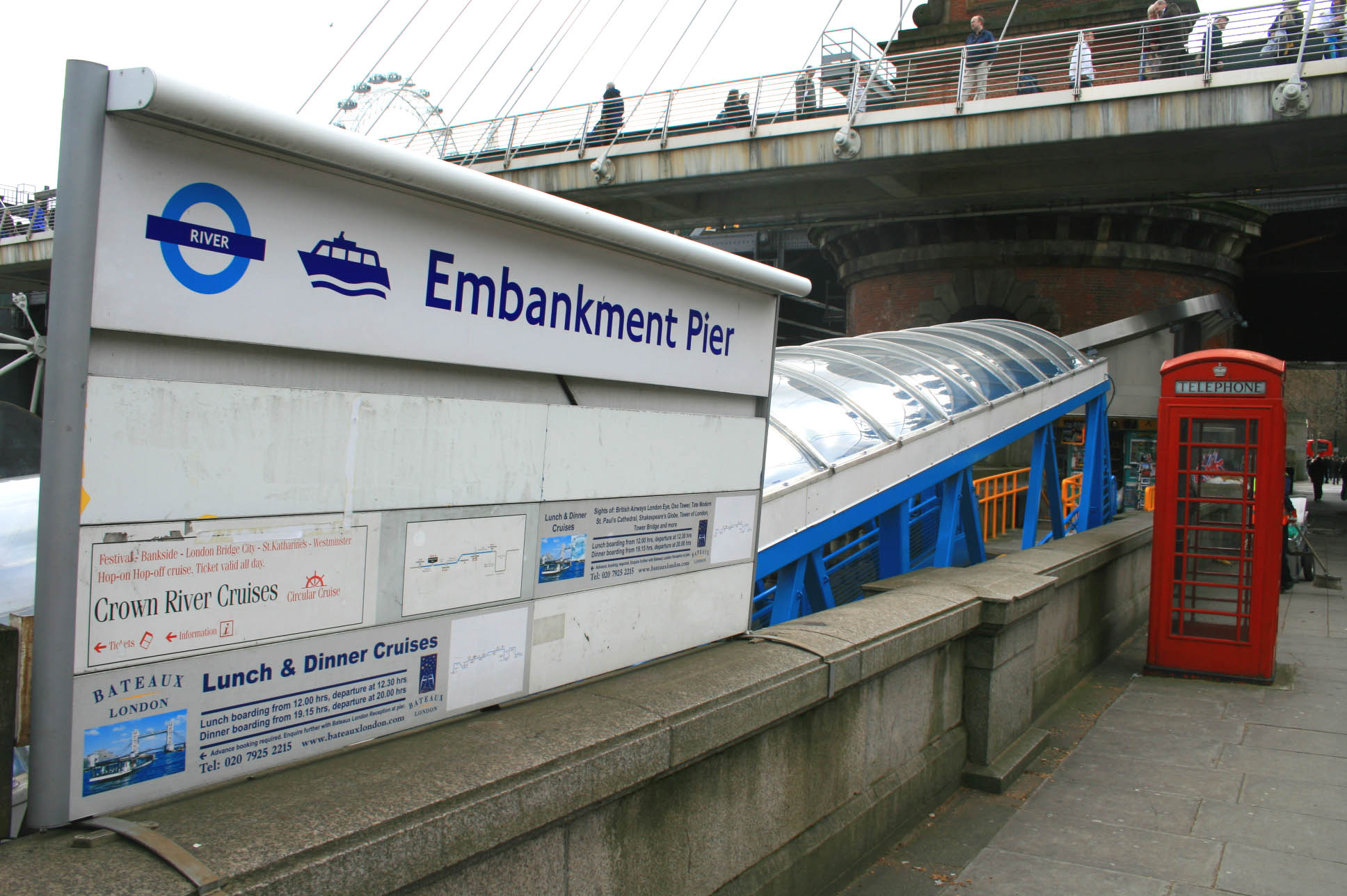
The entrance to Embankment Pier

North bank

- Trafalgar Square
- Covent Garden
- Cleopatra's Needle
- National Gallery
- National Portrait Gallery (London)

South Bank

- London Eye
- South Bank arts complex
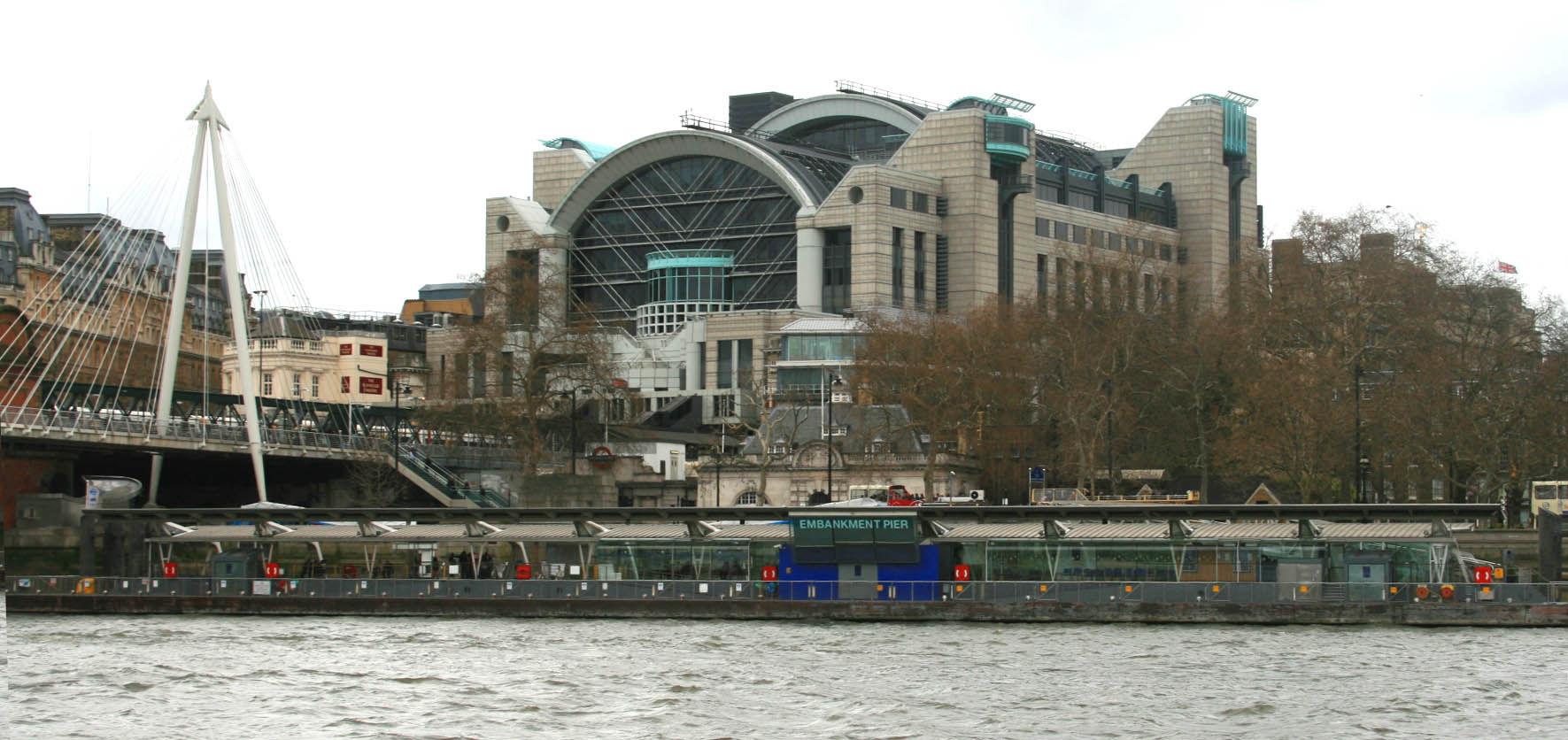
Embankment Pier as seen from the River Thames

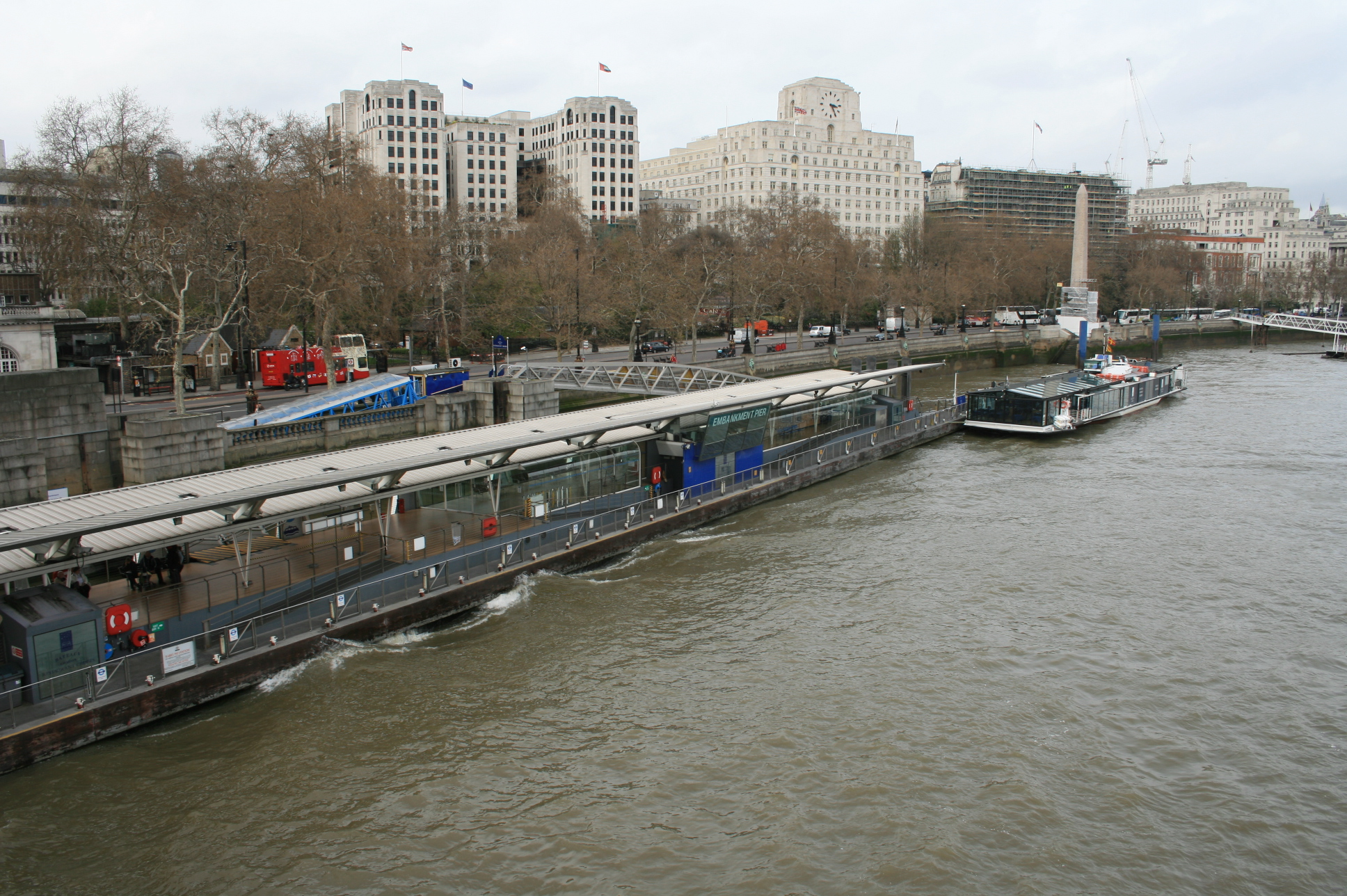
A Bateaux London restaurant boat at the pier

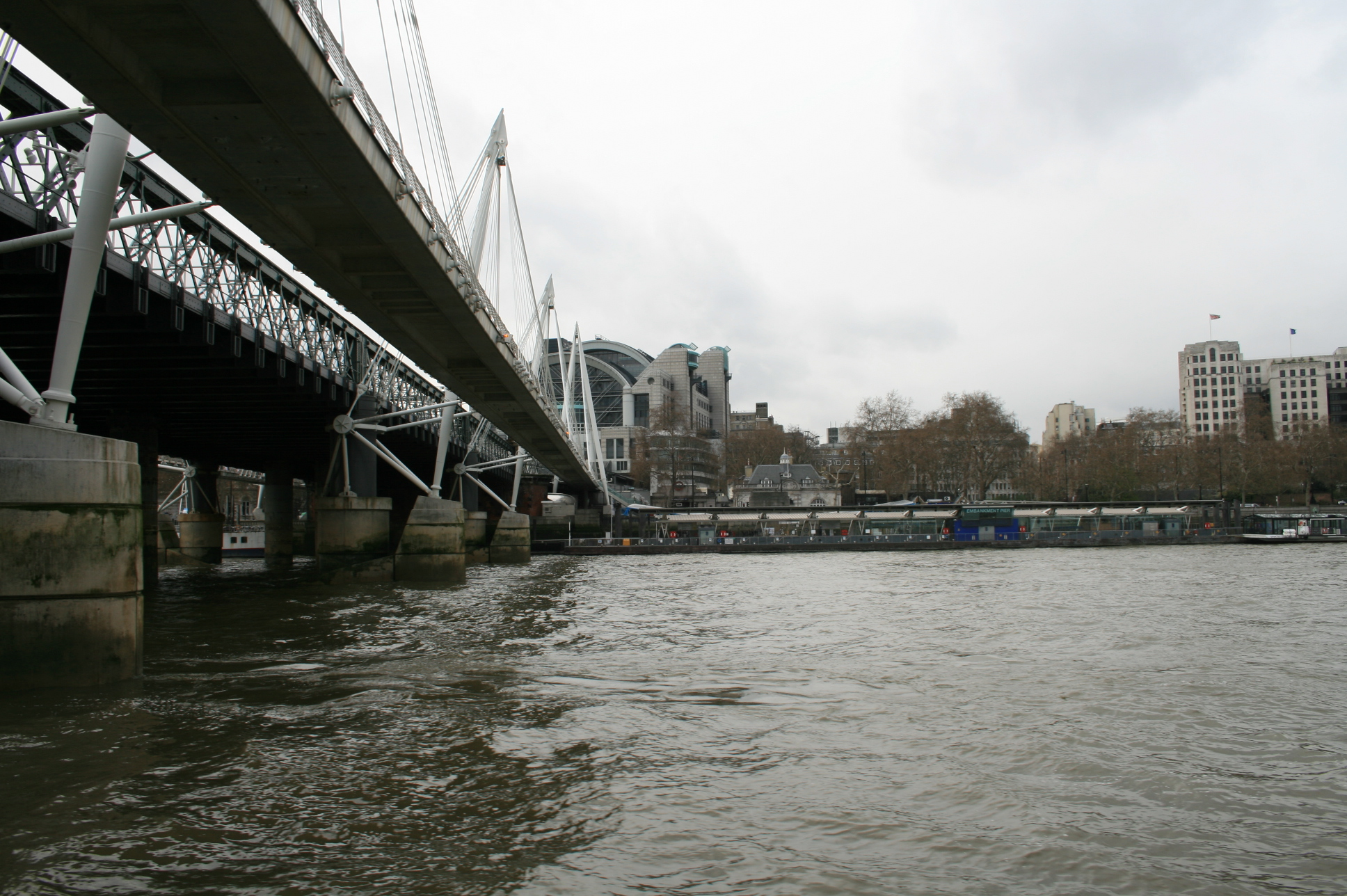
Under the Hungerford Bridge

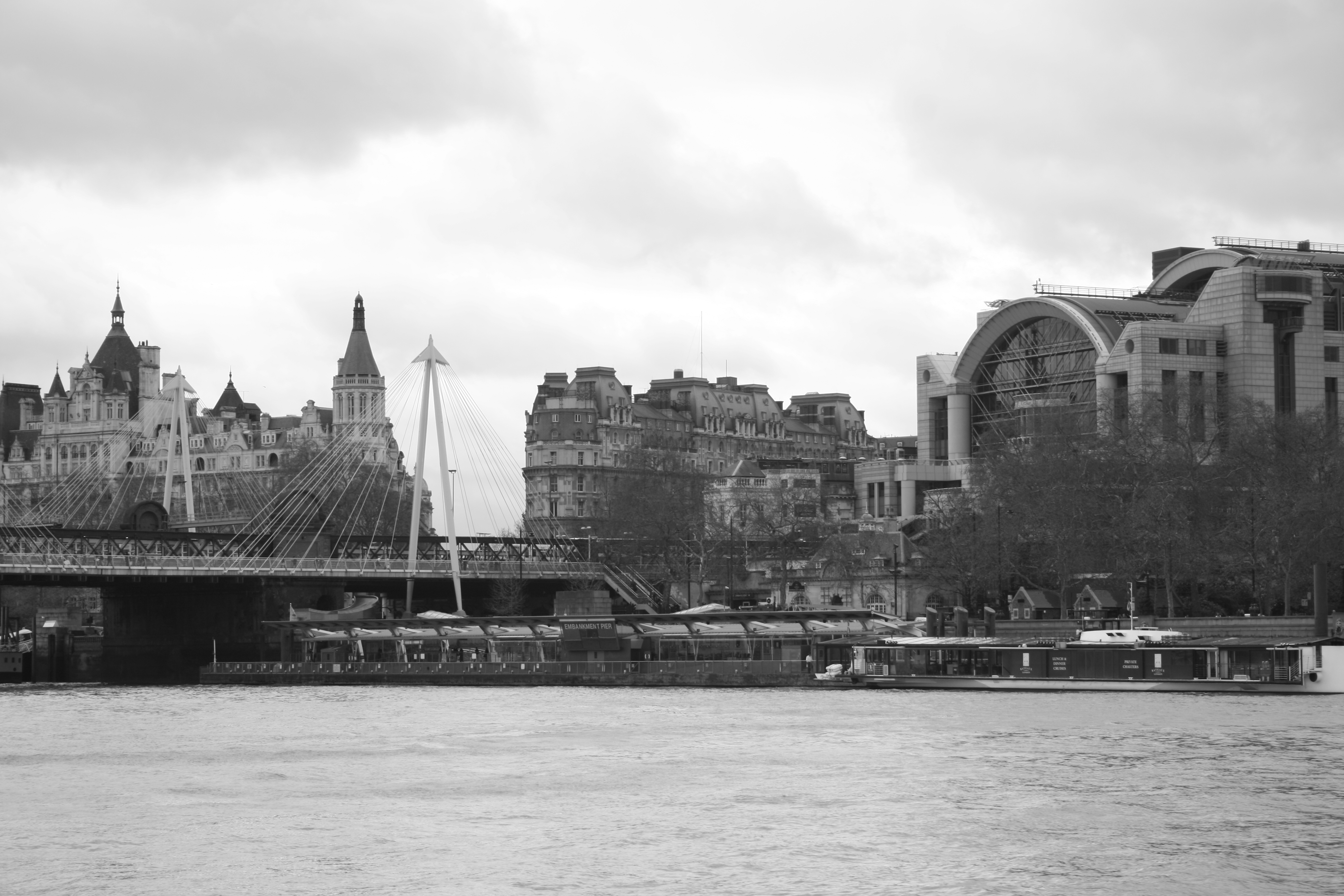
Embankment Pier as seen from the River Thames

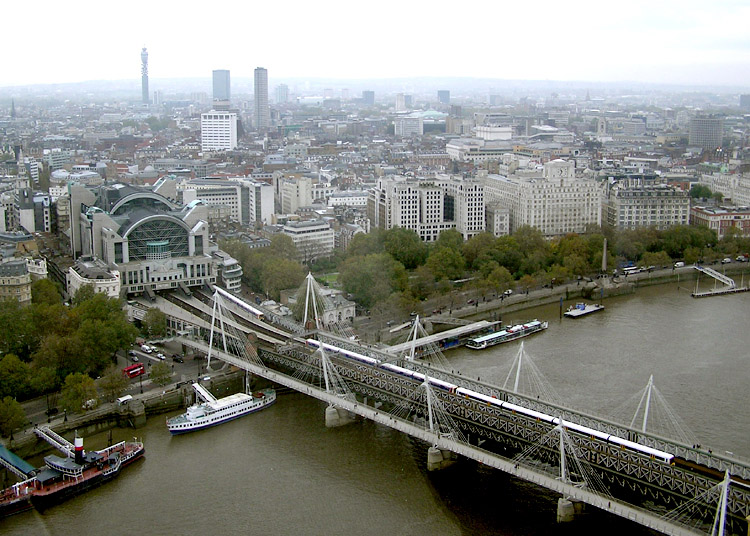
The Hungerford Bridge from the air; the pier is to the right of the bridge

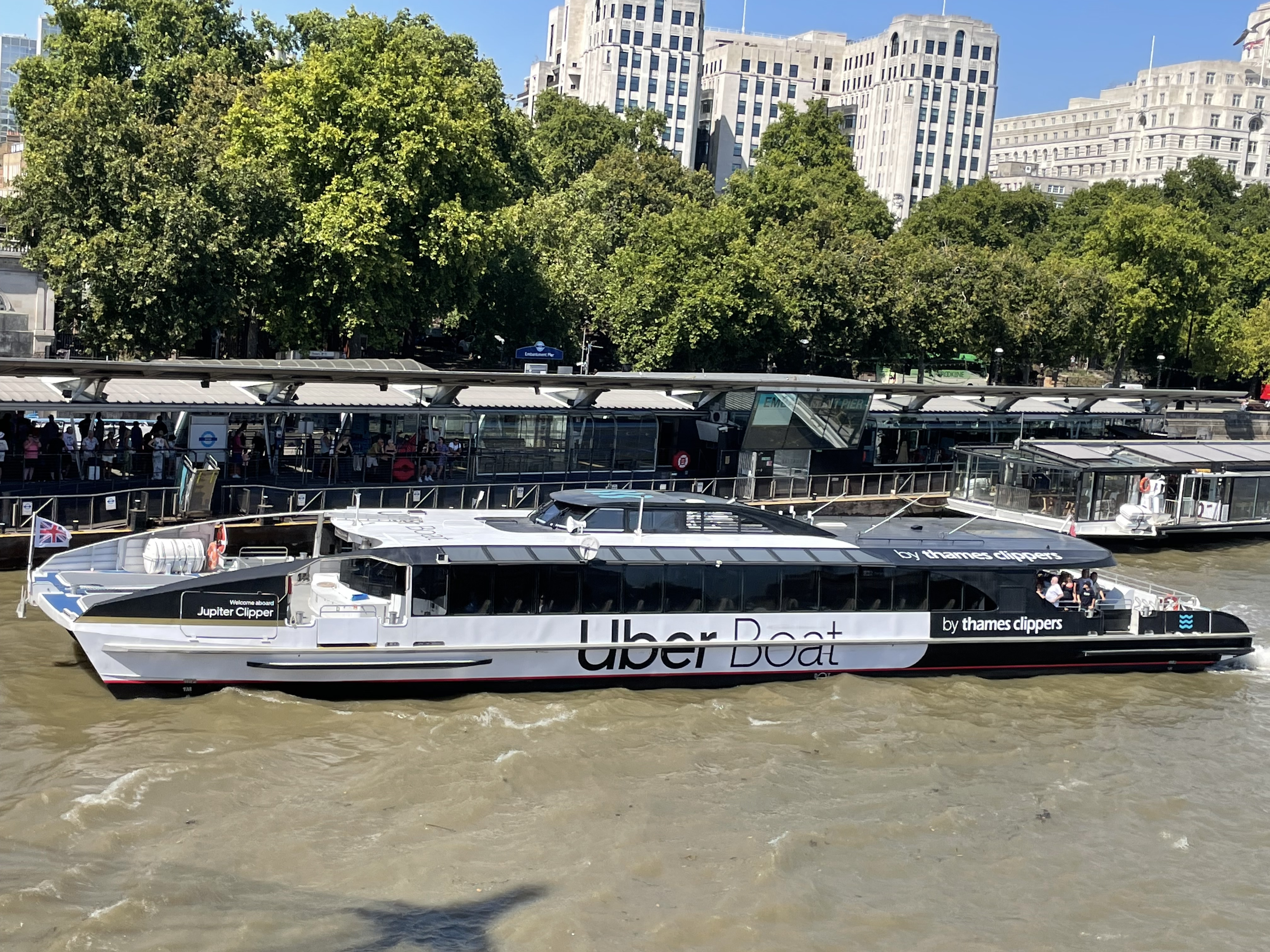
uberBOAT at Embankment Pier

== Lines ==
Preceding station	London River Services	Following station
London Eye Pier towards Battersea Power Station Pier	RB1	Blackfriars Pier towards Barking Riverside Pier
London Eye Pier towards Putney Pier	RB6	Blackfriars Pier towards Barking Riverside Pier
Westminster Millennium Pier Terminus	Westminster to St Katharine's Circular	Festival Pier towards Westminster Millennium Pier

Map of Thames piers in London = TfL piers = Other operators' piers
