= Thames River Services =

London river boat operator

Thames River Sightseeing (TRS)
- London River Services
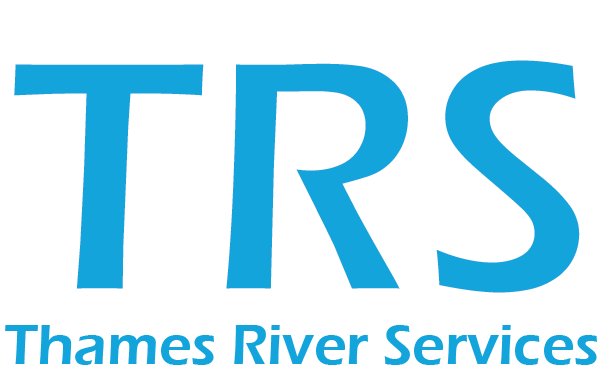

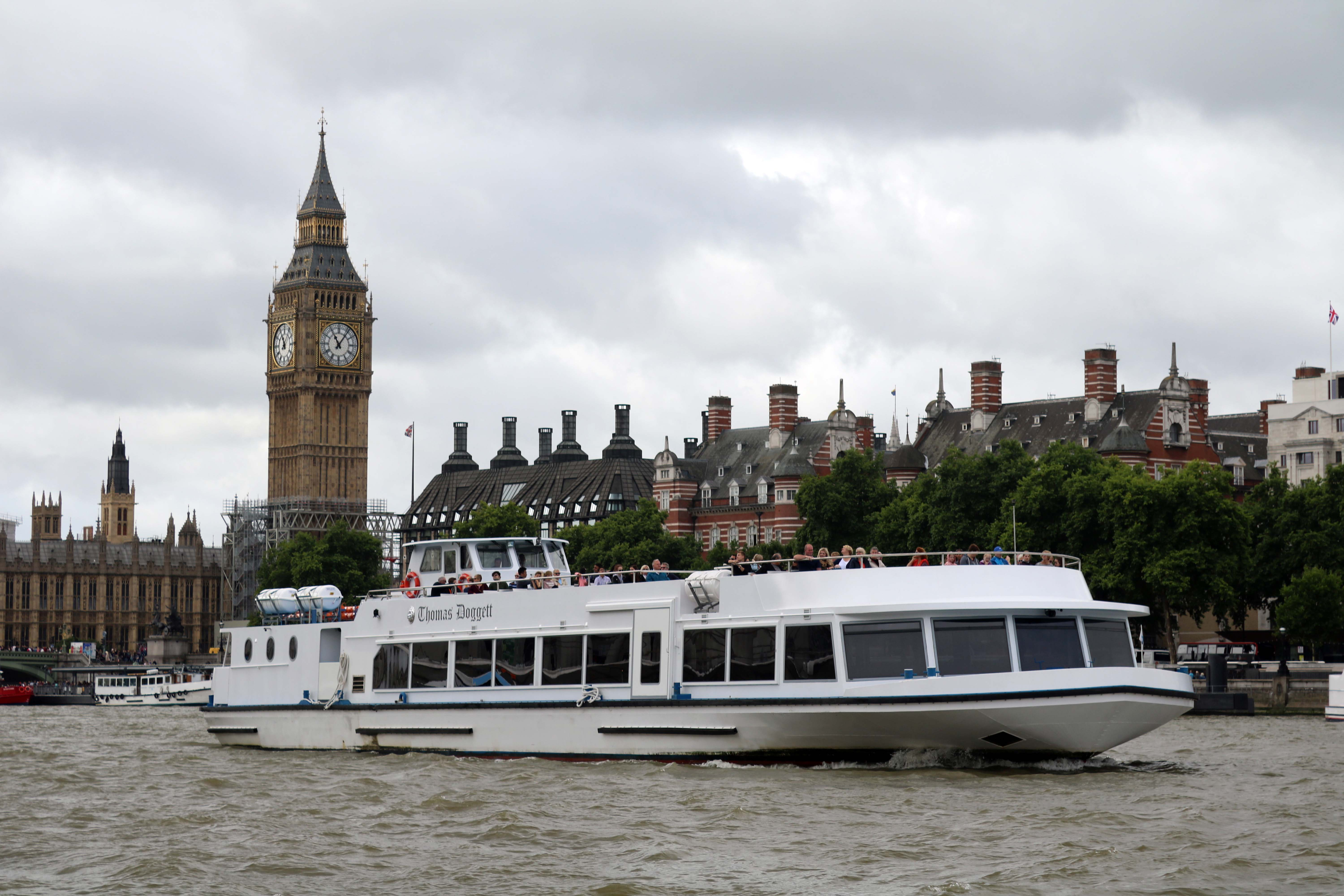
- Thames River Services M.V Thomas Doggett
- Locale: London, UK
- Waterway: River Thames
- Transit type: Sightseeing Cruises
- Operator: Thames River Sightseeing (TRS)
- No. of lines: 2
- No. of vessels: 12
- No. of terminals: 7
- Website: www.thamesriversightseeing.com

Thames River Sightseeing (TRS) are a tour company providing sightseeing cruises on the River Thames in London. Thames River Services operate on the Thames under licence from London River Services, part of Transport for London.

Thames River Services are owned by three companies: Crown River Cruises, Viscount Cruises and Westminster Party Boats.

The TRS boat M.V. Thomas Doggett, of 524 seats and costing £2.5m was built in the Netherlands and launched in July 2017. The launch was attended by Lord Mayor of London, Andrew Parmley.

== Services ==
Scheduled services depart daily from Westminster Pier and travel east along the Thames to Greenwich Pier before returning. In the summer, the boats also circle around the Thames Barrier. Westbound trips also call at Tower Bridge Quay, next to Tower Bridge.

Passengers who hold a Transport for London Travelcard and Oystercard are offered a 33% discount on ticket prices.
