= Bankside Pier =

Pier on the River Thames in London

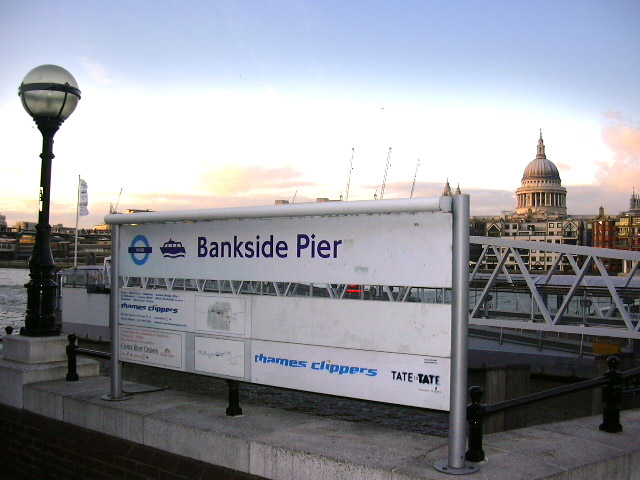
- The gangway at Bankside Pier
- Location: River Thames, London, UK
- Coordinates: 51.508553°N 0.096340°W
- Owner: London River Services
- Operator: Uber Boat by Thames Clippers

History
- Location within City of London

Bankside Pier is a stop for river services in London. It is located on the south bank of the River Thames, close to the Tate Modern.

Three services call at the pier: the river bus routes RB1 (between Battersea Power Station and Barking Riverside) and RB2 (from here to Vauxhall (St George Wharf) Pier and Millbank Pier for the Tate Britain). The third service is the Circular Cruise Westminster which goes to Westminster via St Katherine's.

== Other public transport nearby ==
- Southwark tube station (Jubilee line)
- Blackfriars station (Circle and District lines & Thameslink) – on the north side of the River Thames
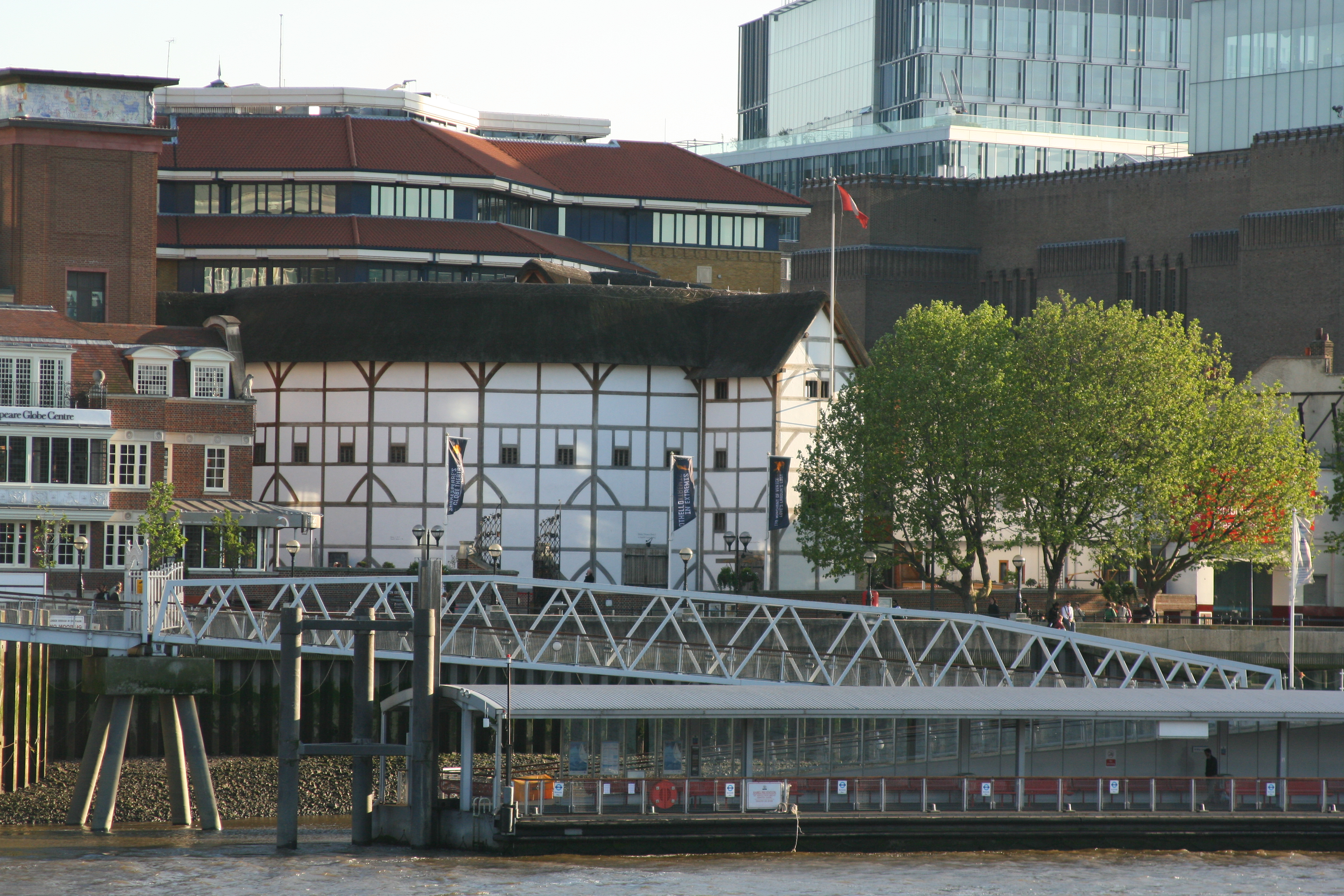
The pier and Shakespeare's Globe

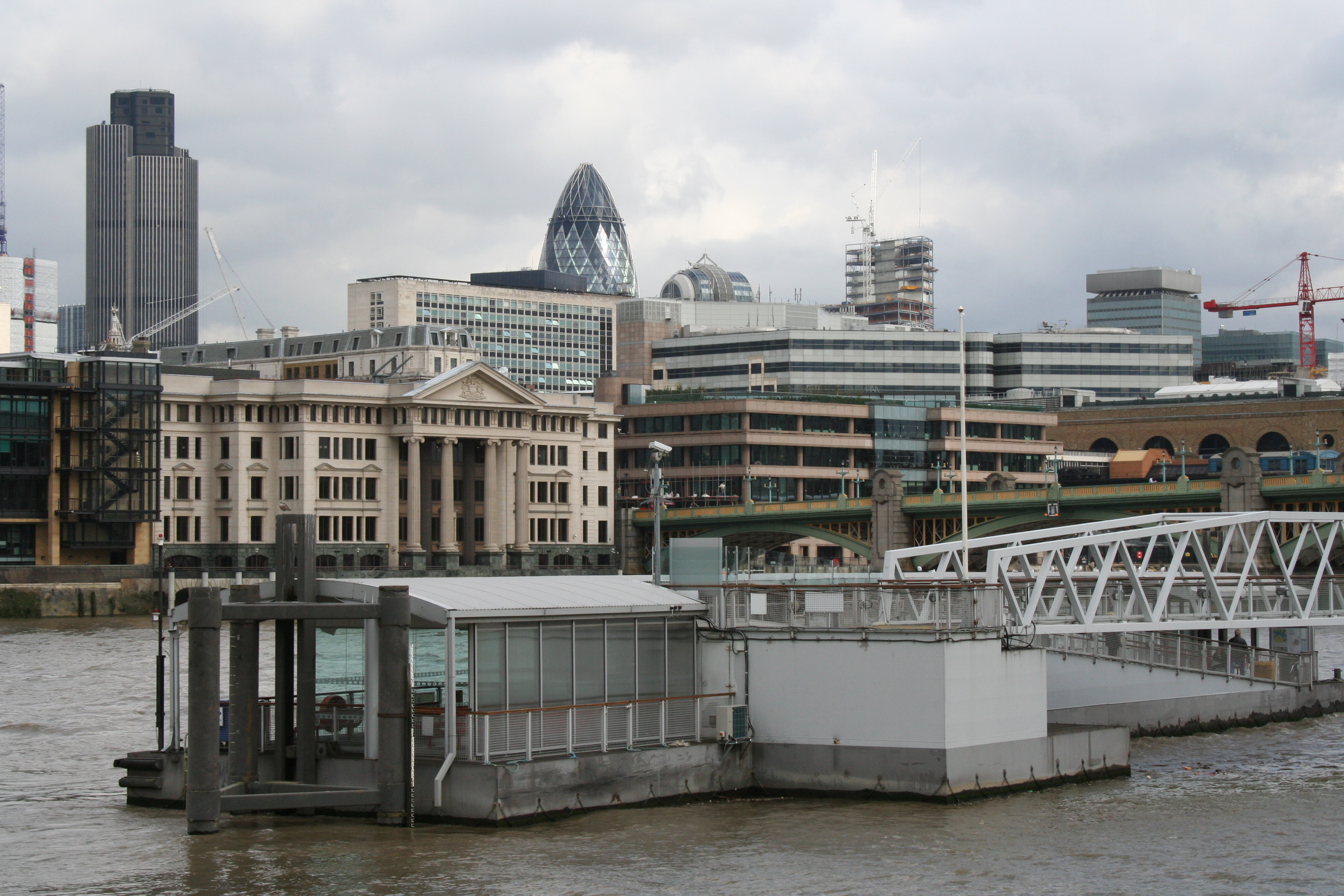
The pier as seen from the South Bank

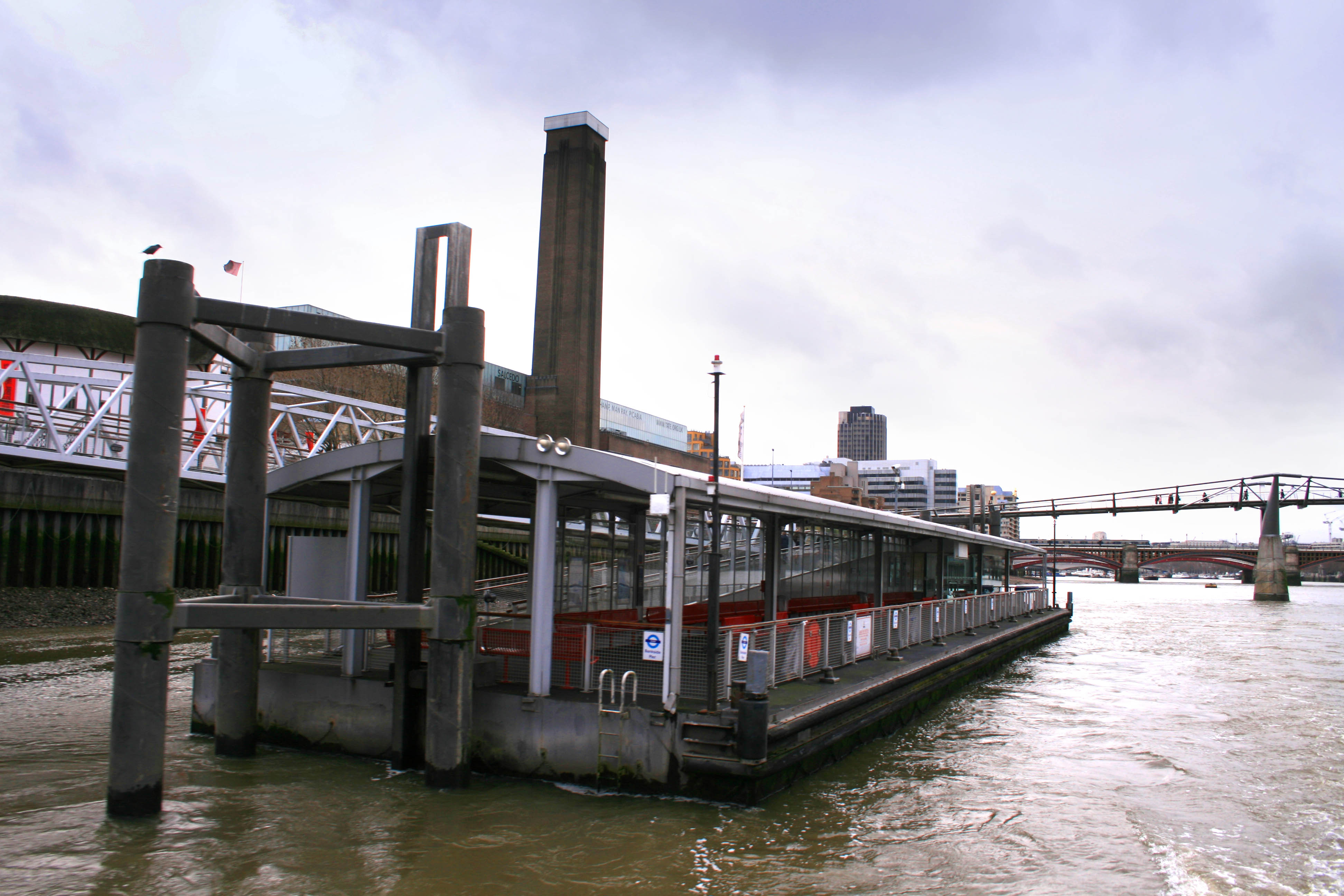
Departing from the pier

== Services ==
Preceding station	London River Services	Following station
Blackfriars Pier towards Battersea Power Station Pier	RB1	London Bridge City Pier towards Barking Riverside Pier
Blackfriars Pier towards Putney Pier	RB6	London Bridge City Pier towards Barking Riverside Pier
Festival Pier towards Westminster Millennium Pier	Westminster to St Katharine's Circular	London Bridge City Pier towards Westminster Millennium Pier

Map of Thames piers in London = TfL piers = Other operators' piers
