= Tower Bridge Quay =

Pier on the River Thames

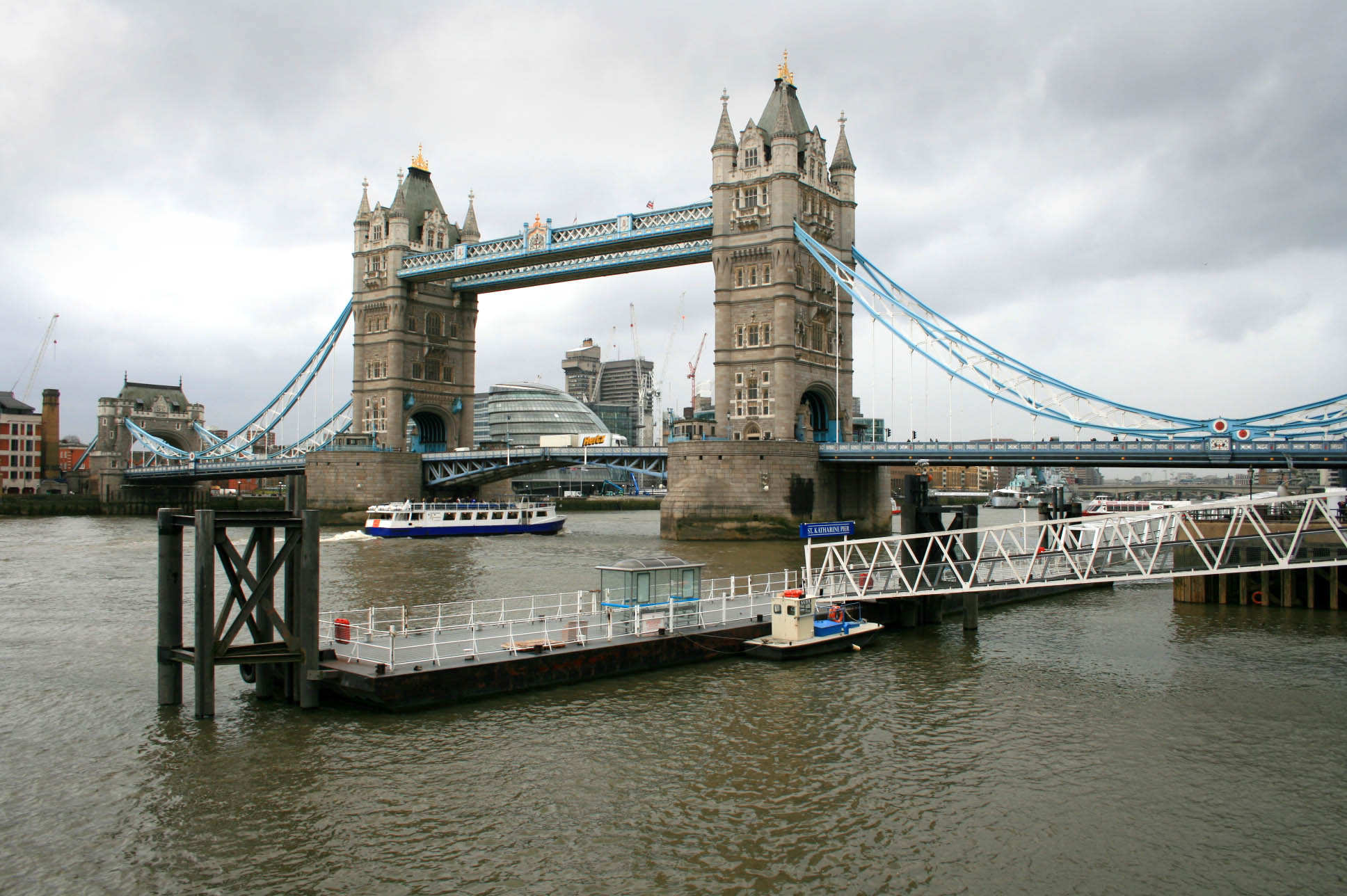
- Type: Tourist/leisure services
- Location: River Thames, London, UK
- Coordinates: 51.506071°N 0.073535°W
- Owner: Woods River Cruises
- Operator: Woods' Silver Fleet

History
- Location within Central London

Tower Bridge Quay (previously St. Katharine's Pier) is a river transport pier on the River Thames, in London, England. It is owned & operated by Woods River Cruises trading as Woods' Silver Fleet and served by various river transport and cruise operators.

It is situated on the north bank of the Thames, on the east side of Tower Bridge, and immediately in front of the Thistle Tower Hotel. The pier is about ten minutes walk from Tower Hill tube station.

Tower Bridge Quay should not be confused with the nearby St Katharine Docks, which is a private yacht marina and residential area.

== Services ==
The main service from Tower Bridge Quay is a "hop-on, hop-off" circular river cruise operated by Crown River Cruises which goes west non-stop to Westminster Millennium Pier before returning east via the South Bank arts centre.

There is also a Westminster-Greenwich express service run by Thames River Services which circles around the Thames Barrier before returning to central London.

== Interchange ==
- Tower Hill Underground station and Tower Gateway DLR station for London Underground and Docklands Light Railway.
- Tower Millennium Pier is located on the other (West) side of Tower Bridge, providing the main commuter river boat services

== Local attractions ==
- St Katharine Docks
- Tower of London
- Tower Bridge

Preceding station	London River Services	Following station
London Bridge City Pier towards Westminster Millennium Pier	Westminster to St Katharine's Circular	Westminster Millennium Pier Terminus

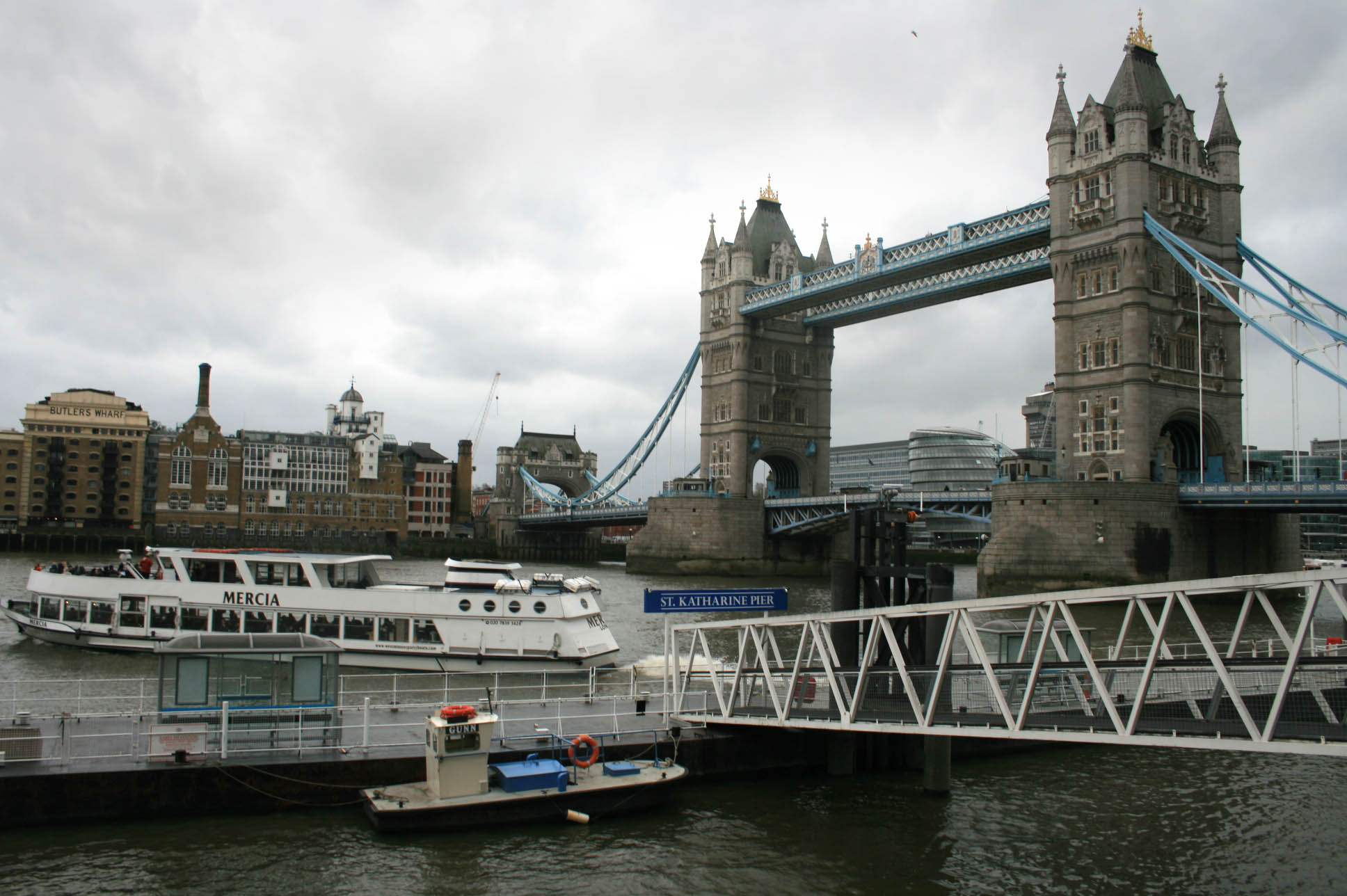
A Crown River Cruise boat leaving the pier

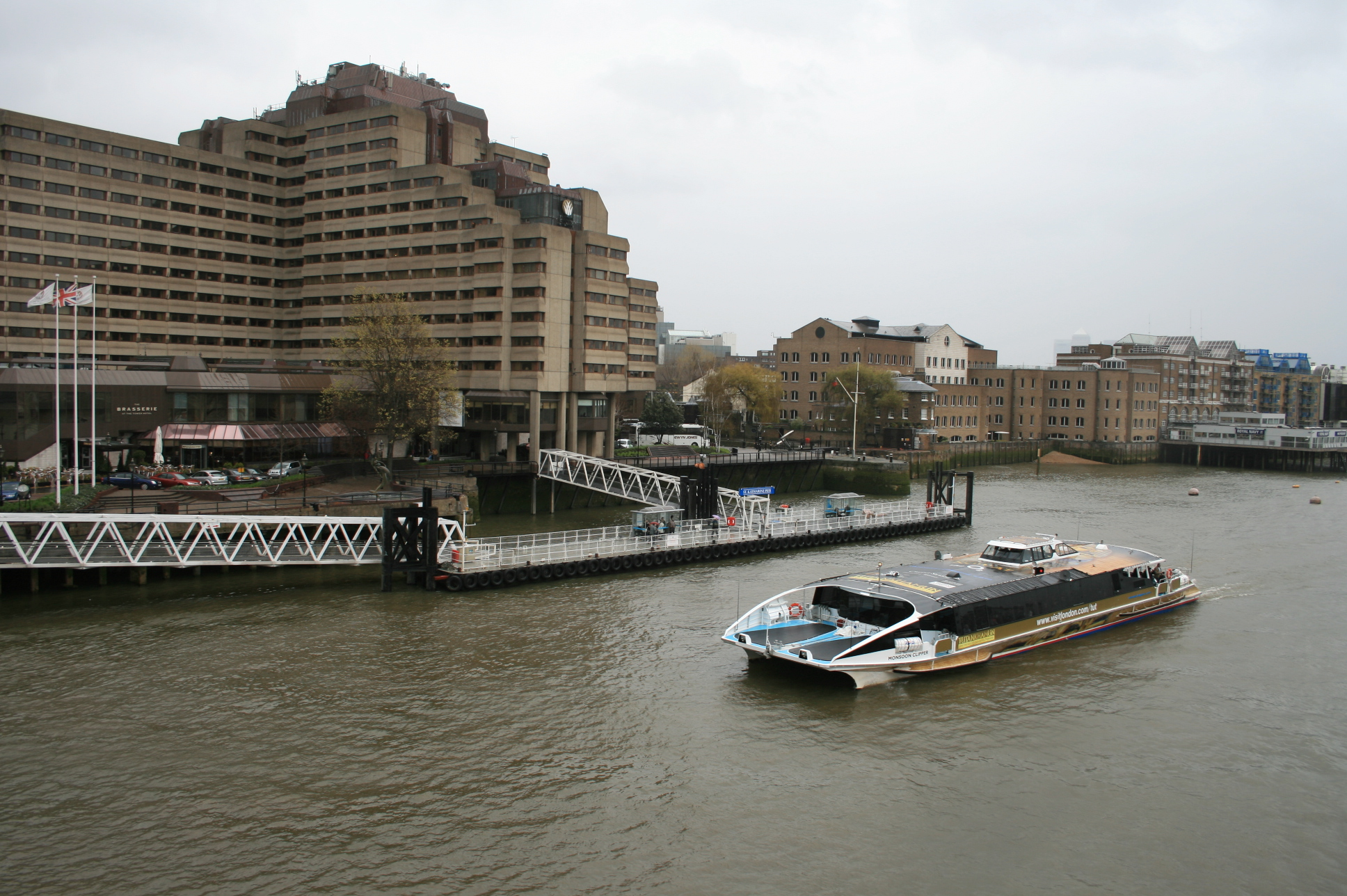
A Thames Clipper catamaran passes the pier (Tower Hotel in the background)

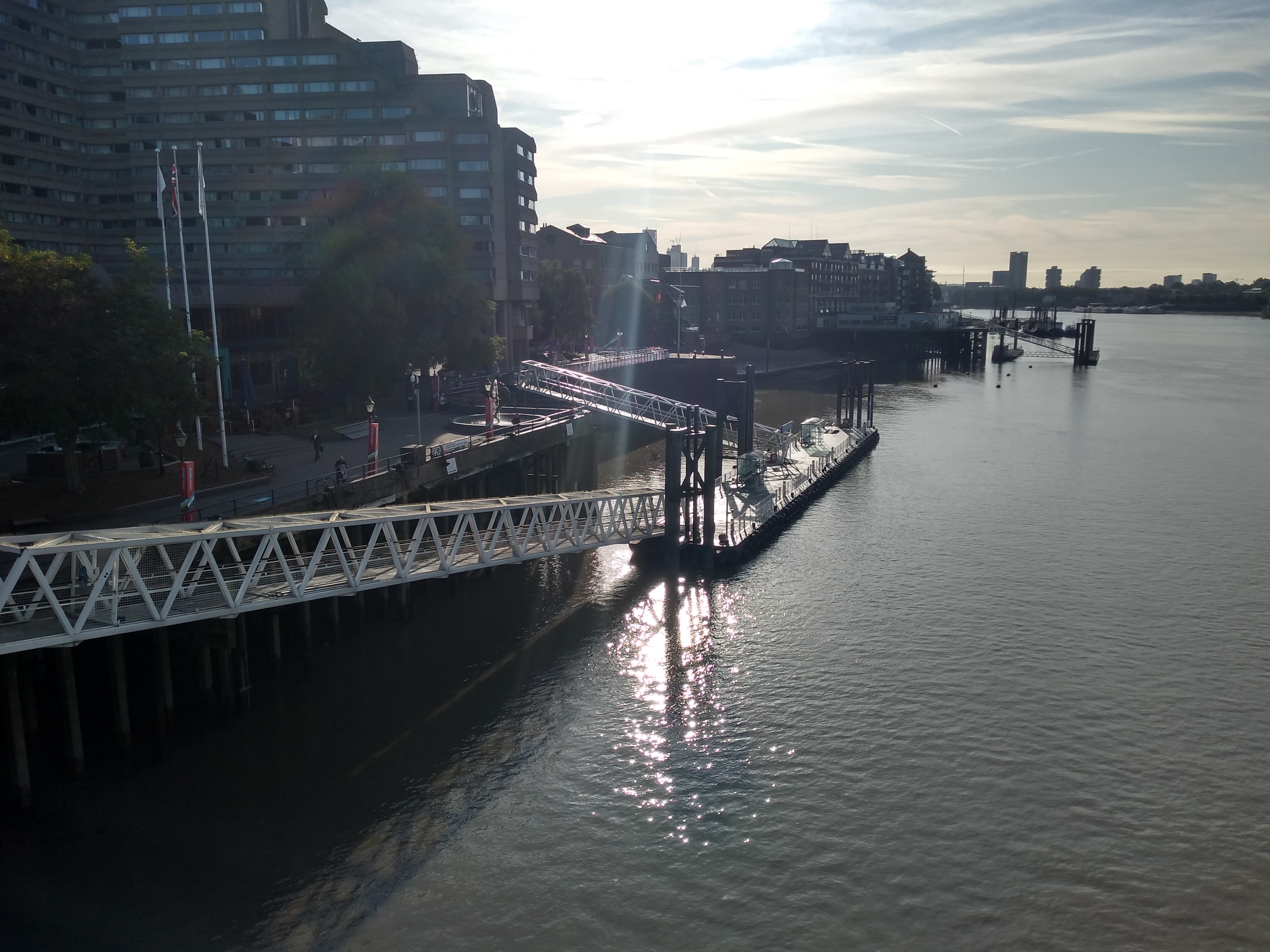
Picture taken at Sunrise
