= List of acts of the Parliament of the United Kingdom from 1811 =

This is a complete list of acts of the Parliament of the United Kingdom for the year 1811.

Note that the first parliament of the United Kingdom was held in 1801; parliaments between 1707 and 1800 were either parliaments of Great Britain or of Ireland). For acts passed up until 1707, see the list of acts of the Parliament of England and the list of acts of the Parliament of Scotland. For acts passed from 1707 to 1800, see the list of acts of the Parliament of Great Britain. See also the list of acts of the Parliament of Ireland.

For acts of the devolved parliaments and assemblies in the United Kingdom, see the list of acts of the Scottish Parliament, the list of acts of the Northern Ireland Assembly, and the list of acts and measures of Senedd Cymru; see also the list of acts of the Parliament of Northern Ireland.

The number shown after each act's title is its chapter number. Acts passed before 1963 are cited using this number, preceded by the year(s) of the reign during which the relevant parliamentary session was held; thus the Union with Ireland Act 1800 is cited as "39 & 40 Geo. 3 c. 67", meaning the 67th act passed during the session that started in the 39th year of the reign of George III and which finished in the 40th year of that reign. Note that the modern convention is to use Arabic numerals in citations (thus "41 Geo. 3" rather than "41 Geo. III"). Acts of the last session of the Parliament of Great Britain and the first session of the Parliament of the United Kingdom are both cited as "41 Geo. 3". Acts passed from 1963 onwards are simply cited by calendar year and chapter number.

All modern acts have a short title, e.g. "the Local Government Act 2003". Some earlier acts also have a short title given to them by later acts, such as by the Short Titles Act 1896.

== 51 Geo. 3 ==
The fifth session of the 4th Parliament of the United Kingdom, which met from 1 November 1810 until 24 July 1811.

This session was also traditionally cited as 51 G. 3.

=== Public general acts ===
Short title	Citation	Royal assent
Long title
Care of King During his Illness, etc. Act 1811 or the Regency Act 1811 (repealed)	51 Geo. 3. c. 1	5 February 1811
An Act to provide for the Administration of the Royal Authority, and for the Care of His Majesty's Royal Person, during the Continuance of His Majesty's Illness; and for the Resumption of the Exercise of the Royal Authority by His Majesty. (Repealed by Statute Law Revision Act 1873 (36 & 37 Vict. c. 91))
Duties on Malt, etc. Act 1811 (repealed)	51 Geo. 3. c. 2	8 March 1811
An Act for continuing to His Majesty certain Duties on Malt, Sugar, Tobacco and Snuff, in Great Britain; and on Pensions, Offices and Personal Estates in England; for the Service of the Year One thousand eight hundred and eleven. (Repealed by Statute Law Revision Act 1873 (36 & 37 Vict. c. 91))
Exchequer Bills Act 1811 (repealed)	51 Geo. 3. c. 3	8 March 1811
An Act for raising the Sum of Ten millions five hundred thousand Pounds, by Exchequer Bills, for the Service of Great Britain for the Year One thousand eight hundred and eleven. (Repealed by Statute Law Revision Act 1873 (36 & 37 Vict. c. 91))
Exchequer Bills (No. 2) Act 1811 (repealed)	51 Geo. 3. c. 4	8 March 1811
An Act for raising the Sum of One million five hundred thousand Pounds, by Exchequer Bills, for the Service of Great Britain for the Year One thousand eight hundred and eleven. (Repealed by Statute Law Revision Act 1873 (36 & 37 Vict. c. 91))
Treasury Bills (Ireland) Act 1811 (repealed)	51 Geo. 3. c. 5	8 March 1811
An Act for raising the Sum of One Million, by Treasury Bills, for the Service of Ireland for the Year One thousand eight hundred and eleven. (Repealed by Statute Law Revision Act 1873 (36 & 37 Vict. c. 91))
Census (Great Britain) Act 1811 (repealed)	51 Geo. 3. c. 6	22 March 1811
An Act for taking an Account of the Population of Great Britain, and of the increase or Diminution thereof. (Repealed by Statute Law Revision Act 1873 (36 & 37 Vict. c. 91))
Silk Manufacture Act 1811 (repealed)	51 Geo. 3. c. 7	22 March 1811
An Act to amend Two Acts of the Thirteenth (Note: Silk Manufactures Act 1772 (13 Geo. 3. c. 68)) and Thirty second (Note: Silk Manufacture Act 1792 (32 Geo. 3. c. 44)) Years of His present Majesty, relating to the Wages of Persons employed in the Silk Manufacture. (Repealed by Silk Manufactures Act 1824 (5 Geo. 4. c. 66))
Mutiny Act 1811 (repealed)	51 Geo. 3. c. 8	22 March 1811
An Act for punishing Mutiny and Desertion; and for the better Payment of the Army and their Quarters. (Repealed by Statute Law Revision Act 1873 (36 & 37 Vict. c. 91))
Marine Mutiny Act 1811 (repealed)	51 Geo. 3. c. 9	22 March 1811
An Act for the Regulation of His Majesty's Royal Marine Forces while on Shore. (Repealed by Statute Law Revision Act 1873 (36 & 37 Vict. c. 91))
Wide Streets, Dublin Act 1811 (repealed)	51 Geo. 3. c. 10	25 March 1811
An Act to continue, until the Twenty fifth Day of March One thousand eight hundred and thirty three, certain Acts of the Parliament of Ireland, so far as the same relate to the Improvement of the City of Dublin, by making wide and convenient Passages through the same. (Repealed by Statute Law Revision Act 1873 (36 & 37 Vict. c. 91))
Coal Duty, Dublin Act 1811 (repealed)	51 Geo. 3. c. 11	25 March 1811
An Act to continue, until the Twenty fifth Day of March One thousand eight hundred and thirty two, certain Acts of the Parliament of Ireland, so far as the same relate to the Duty on Coals imported into the Harbour of Dublin, and to the regulating the Coal Trade thereof. (Repealed by Statute Law Revision Act 1873 (36 & 37 Vict. c. 91))
Drawbacks, etc., on Sugar Act 1811 (repealed)	51 Geo. 3. c. 12	25 March 1811
An Act to continue, until the Twenty fifth Day of March One thousand eight hundred and twelve, an Act (Note: Drawbacks (Ireland) Act 1807 (47 Geo. 3 Sess. 1. c. 19)) for regulating the Drawbacks and Bounties on the Exportation of Sugar from Ireland. (Repealed by Statute Law Revision Act 1873 (36 & 37 Vict. c. 91))
Sugar Bounties, etc. Act 1811 (repealed)	51 Geo. 3. c. 13	25 March 1811
An Act for further continuing, until the Twenty fifth Day of March One thousand eight hundred and twelve, certain Bounties and Drawbacks on the Exportation of Sugar from Great Britain; and for suspending the Countervailing Duties and Bounties on Sugar when the Duties imposed by an Act of the Forty ninth Year of His present Majesty (Note: Customs (No. 3) Act 1809 (49 Geo. 3. c. 98)) shall be suspended; and for continuing so much of an Act of the Twenty seventh Year of His present Majesty (Note: Bounties on Sugar Act 1807 (47 Geo. 3 Sess. 1. c. 22)) as allows a Bounty upon Double Refined Sugar imported until the Twenty fifth Day of March One thousand eight hundred and thirteen, and so much of the same Act as allows a Bounty on Raw Sugar, exported until the Twenty fifth Day of March One thousand eight hundred and twelve. (Repealed by Statute Law Revision Act 1873 (36 & 37 Vict. c. 91))
Exportation and Importation Act 1811 (repealed)	51 Geo. 3. c. 14	25 March 1811
An Act to continue several Laws relating to the granting a Bounty upon certain Species of British and Irish Linens exported from Great Britain, and taking off the Duties en the Importation of Foreign Raw Linen Yarns made of Flax into Great Britain, until the Twenty fifth Day of March One thousand eight hundred and twenty one; to the prohibiting the Exportation from and permitting the Importation into Great Britain of Corn, and for allowing the Importation of other Articles of Provision without Payment of Duty during the Continuance of the War, and until Six Months after the Ratification of a Definitive Treaty of Peace; and to the permitting the Importation of Tobacco into Great Britain from any Place whatever, until the Twenty fifth Day of March One thousand eight hundred and twelve. (Repealed by Statute Law Revision Act 1873 (36 & 37 Vict. c. 91))
Exchequer Bills (No. 3) Act 1811 (repealed)	51 Geo. 3. c. 15	4 April 1811
An Act for enabling His Majesty to direct the Issue of Exchequer Bills to a limited Amount, for the Purpose and in Manner therein mentioned. (Repealed by Statute Law Revision Act 1873 (36 & 37 Vict. c. 91))
National Debt Act 1811 (repealed)	51 Geo. 3. c. 16	4 April 1811
An Act for granting Annuities to discharge certain Exchequer Bills. (Repealed by Statute Law Revision Act 1870 (33 & 34 Vict. c. 69))
Indemnity Act 1811 (repealed)	51 Geo. 3. c. 17	4 April 1811
An Act to render valid certain Acts done for completing the Regular Militia, and to indemnify the Persons concerned therein. (Repealed by Statute Law Revision Act 1873 (36 & 37 Vict. c. 91))
Indemnity (No. 2) Act 1811 (repealed)	51 Geo. 3. c. 18	4 April 1811
An Act to indemnify such Persons in the United Kingdom as have omitted to qualify themselves for Offices and Employments, and for extending the times limited for those Purposes respectively, until the Twenty fifth Day of March One thousand eight hundred and twelve; and to permit such Persons in Great Britain as have omitted to make and file Affidavits of the Execution of Indentures of Clerks to Attornies and Solicitors, to make and file the same on or before the First Day of Hilary Term One thousand eight hundred and twelve. (Repealed by Statute Law Revision Act 1873 (36 & 37 Vict. c. 91))
Inquiry into Military Expenditure, etc. Act 1811 (repealed)	51 Geo. 3. c. 19	4 April 1811
An Act to continue, until the Twenty fifth Day of March One Thousand eight hundred and twelve, an Act of the Forty fifth Year of His present Majesty, (Note: Inquiry into Military Departments Act 1805 (45 Geo. 3. c. 47)) for appointing Commissioners to enquire into the Public Expenditure and the Conduct of the Public Business of the Military Departments therein mentioned, and to extend the same to Public works executed by the Office of Works and others. (Repealed by Statute Law Revision Act 1873 (36 & 37 Vict. c. 91))
Militia Act 1811 (repealed)	51 Geo. 3. c. 20	11 April 1811
An Act to allow a certain Proportion of the Militia of Great Britain to enlist annually into the Regular Forces; and to provide for the gradual Reduction of the said Militia. (Repealed by Statute Law Revision Act 1861 (24 & 25 Vict. c. 101))
Grants of Pensions Act 1811 (repealed)	51 Geo. 3. c. 21	6 May 1811
An Act to explain and amend an Act, passed in the Fiftieth Year of His Majesty's Reign, intituled "An Act to direct that Accounts of Increases and Diminution of Public Salaries, Pensions and Allowances, shall be annually laid before Parliament; and to regulate and coutroul the Granting and Pay of such Salaries, Pensions and Allowances;" (Note: Public Salaries, etc. Act 1810 (50 Geo. 3. c. 117)) so far as respects the Grant of Pensions or Allowances by His Majesty to Persons who previously to the passing of the said Act had served the Crown in Foreign Courts. (Repealed by Superannuation Act 1834 (4 & 5 Will. 4. c. 24))
National Debt (No. 2) Act 1811 (repealed)	51 Geo. 3. c. 22	14 May 1811
An Act for raising the Sum of Two Millions five hundred thousand Pounds, by way of Annuities, and Treasury Bills, for the Service of Ireland. (Repealed by Statute Law Revision Act 1870 (33 & 34 Vict. c. 69))
Slave Trade Felony Act 1811 or the Slave Trade Act 1811 (repealed)	51 Geo. 3. c. 23	14 May 1811
An Act for rendering more effectual an Act made in the Forty seventh Year of His Majesty's Reign, intituled, "An Act for the Abolition of the Slave Trade." (Note: Slave Trade Act 1807 (47 Geo. 3 Sess. 1. c. 36)) (Repealed by Statute Law Revision Act 1861 (24 & 25 Vict. c. 101))
Clearance of Vessels, London Act 1811 (repealed)	51 Geo. 3. c. 24	14 May 1811
An Act to repeal so much of an Act of the Nineteenth Year of His present Majesty, (Note: Shipping and Navigation Act 1779 (19 Geo. 3. c. 48)) as prevents Masters of Ships removing their Vessels out of the Stream, except to the lawful Quays in the Port of London, before the Goods are discharged or their Vessels are cleared by the proper Officers inwards or outwards, so far as relates to any Ship or Vessel entered inwards or outwards from or to any Port io Ireland. (Repealed by Statute Law Revision Act 1873 (36 & 37 Vict. c. 91))
Payment of Creditors (Scotland) Act 1811 (repealed)	51 Geo. 3. c. 25	14 May 1811
An Act for further continuing, until the Twenty fifth Day of July One thousand eight hundred and thirteen, an Act made in the Thirty third Year of His present Majesty, (Note: Payment of Creditors (Scotland) Act 1793 (33 Geo. 3. c. 74)) for rendering the Payment of Creditors more equal and expeditious in Scotland. (Repealed by Statute Law Revision Act 1873 (36 & 37 Vict. c. 91))
National Debt (No. 3) Act 1811 (repealed)	51 Geo. 3. c. 26	21 May 1811
An Act for raising the Sum of Four millions nine hundred eighty one thousand three hundred Pounds by way of Annuities. (Repealed by Statute Law Revision Act 1870 (33 & 34 Vict. c. 69))
Malt, etc., Duties Act 1811 (repealed)	51 Geo. 3. c. 27	21 May 1811
An Act to explain and amend Two Acts of the Fiftieth and Fifty first Years of His present Majesty, for continuing certain Duties on Malt, Sugar, Tobacco and Snuff, and other Purposes mentioned in the said Acts. (Repealed by Statute Law Revision Act 1873 (36 & 37 Vict. c. 91))
Quartering of Soldiers Act 1811 (repealed)	51 Geo. 3. c. 28	21 May 1811
An Act for increasing the Rates of Subsistence to be paid to Innkeepers and others on quartering Soldiers. (Repealed by Statute Law Revision Act 1873 (36 & 37 Vict. c. 91))
Bringing of Coals, etc., to London Act 1811 (repealed)	51 Geo. 3. c. 29	21 May 1811
An Act for continuing, until the First Day of August One thousand eight hundred and thirteen, Two Acts of the Forty fifth (Note: Bringing of Coals, etc., to London, etc. Act 1805 (45 Geo. 3. c. 128)) and Fiftieth (Note: Bringing of Coals, etc., to London, etc. Act 1810 (50 Geo. 3. c. 110)) Years of His present Majesty, allowing the bringing of Coals, Culm and Cinders to London and Westminster by Inland Navigation. (Repealed by Statute Law Revision Act 1873 (36 & 37 Vict. c. 91))
Militia (Ireland) Act 1811 (repealed)	51 Geo. 3. c. 30	25 May 1811
An Act to amend the several Acts for enabling His Majesty to accept the Services of Volunteers from the Militia of Ireland. (Repealed by Statute Law Revision Act 1861 (24 & 25 Vict. c. 101))
Duty on Copper Act 1811 (repealed)	51 Geo. 3. c. 31	25 May 1811
An Act to continue, during the present War and until the Expiration of Six Calendar Months after the Ratification of a Definitive Treaty of Peace, and amend an Act made in the Forty eighth Year of His present Majesty, (Note: Customs (No. 6) Act 1808 (48 Geo. 3. c. 67)) for granting an additional Duty on Copper imported into Great Britain. (Repealed by Statute Law Revision Act 1873 (36 & 37 Vict. c. 91))
Excise Act 1811 (repealed)	51 Geo. 3. c. 32	25 May 1811
An Act for the better securing Exciseable Goods on board Vessels in the Port of Bristol. (Repealed by Statute Law Revision Act 1861 (24 & 25 Vict. c. 101))
British Calicoes Act 1811 (repealed)	51 Geo. 3. c. 33	25 May 1811
An Act for repeating so much of Two Acts of the Fourteenth (Note: Duty on Cotton Stuffs, etc. Act 1774 (14 Geo. 3. c. 72)) and Twenty fifth (Note: Duties on Linens Act 1785 (25 Geo. 3. c. 72)) Years of His present Majesty as relates to weaving Blue Stripes in British Calicoes. (Repealed by Statute Law Revision Act 1873 (36 & 37 Vict. c. 91))
Southern Whale Fishery Act 1811 (repealed)	51 Geo. 3. c. 34	25 May 1811
An Act for continuing the Premiums allowed to Ships employed in the Southern Whale Fishery. (Repealed by Sea Fisheries Act 1868 (31 & 32 Vict. c. 45))
Advances by Bank of Ireland Act 1811 (repealed)	51 Geo. 3. c. 35	25 May 1811
An Act to secure to the Bank of Ireland the Repayment of all Monies advanced by them for the Purposes and in the manner therein mentioned. (Repealed by Statute Law Revision Act 1870 (33 & 34 Vict. c. 69))
Cinque Ports Act 1811 (repealed)	51 Geo. 3. c. 36	25 May 1811
An Act to facilitate the Execution of Justice within The Cinque Ports. (Repealed by Statute Law (Repeals) Act 1977 (c. 18))
Marriage of Lunatics Act 1811 (repealed)	51 Geo. 3. c. 37	31 May 1811
An Act further to prevent the Marriage of Lunatics. (Repealed for England and Wales by Mental Health Act 1959 (7 & 8 Eliz. 2. c. 72), for Scotland by Mental Health (Scotland) Act 1960 (8 & 9 Eliz. 2. c. 61) and for Northern Ireland by Matrimonial Causes (Northern Ireland) Order 1978 (SI 1978/1045 (N.I.)))
Embezzlement (Ireland) Act 1811 (repealed)	51 Geo. 3. c. 38	31 May 1811
An Act to protect Masters against Embezzlements by their Clerks and Servants in Ireland. (Repealed by Criminal Statutes (Ireland) Repeal Act 1828 (9 Geo. 4. c. 53))
Stealing from Bleaching Grounds (Ireland) Act 1811 (repealed)	51 Geo. 3. c. 39	31 May 1811
An Act to repeal so much of an Act, passed in the Parliament, of Ireland in the Third Year of the Reign of His present Majesty, intituled, "An Act for the better Regulation of the Linen and Hemp Manufactures," (Note: Linen Manufacturers Act 1763 (3 Geo. 3. c. 34 (I))) as takes away the Benefit of Clergy from Felons convicted of dealing Cloth from Bleaching Grounds; and for more effectually preventing such Felonies. (Repealed by Criminal Statutes (Ireland) Repeal Act 1828 (9 Geo. 4. c. 53))
Highways (Ireland) Act 1811 (repealed)	51 Geo. 3. c. 40	31 May 1811
An Act to explain and amend an Act of the last Session of Parliament, (Note: Stage Coaches, etc. (Ireland) Act 1810 (50 Geo. 3. c. 32)) for repealing certain Parts of several Acts relating to the limiting the Number of Persons to be carried by Stage Coaches in Ireland. (Repealed by Statute Law Revision Act 1873 (36 & 37 Vict. c. 91))
Stealing of Linen, etc. Act 1811 (repealed)	51 Geo. 3. c. 41	31 May 1811
An Act to repeal so much of an Act passed in the Eighteenth Year of the Reign of King George the Second, intituled, "An Act for the more effectually preventing the leasing of Linen, Fustian, and Cotton Goods and Wares, in Buildings, Fields, Grounds and other Places used for printings, whitening, bleaching or drying the same," (Note: Stealing from Bleaching Grounds Act 1744 (18 Geo. 2. c. 27)) as takes away the Benefit of Clergy from Persons stealing Cloth in Places therein mentioned; and for the more effectually preventing such Felonies. (Repealed by Master and Servant Act 1889 (52 & 53 Vict. c. 24) and for India by Criminal Law (India) Act 1828 (9 Geo. 4. c. 74))
Distillers of Spirits Act 1811 (repealed)	51 Geo. 3. c. 42	31 May 1811
An Act to empower the Lords Commissioners of the Treasury to exonerate Distillers of Spirits from Sugar, from the Excess of the Duties to which they were liable in consequence of the Expiration of an Act passed in the Forty eighth Year of His present Majesty, above the Duties imposed oy the said Act. (Repealed by Statute Law Revision Act 1873 (36 & 37 Vict. c. 91))
Duties on Certain Woods, etc. Act 1811 (repealed)	51 Geo. 3. c. 43	31 May 1811
An Act for altering the time at which the additional Duties of Customs imposed by an Act of the last Session of Parliament (Note: Customs Act 1810 (50 Geo. 3. c. 77)) on certain Species of Wood were to have taken place; and for granting a Drawback upon Deals and Timber used in the Mines of Tin, Copper and Lead in the Counties of Cornwall and Devon. (Repealed by Customs Law Repeal Act 1825 (6 Geo. 4. c. 105))
Duty on Linen Act 1811 (repealed)	51 Geo. 3. c. 44	31 May 1811
An Act for imposing an additional Duty on Linen imported into Great Britain during the Continuance of the present War, and for Six Months after the Ratification of a Definitive Treaty of Peace. (Repealed by Statute Law Revision Act 1873 (36 & 37 Vict. c. 91))
St. John's, Newfoundland, etc. Act 1811 (repealed)	51 Geo. 3. c. 45	31 May 1811
An Act for taking away the public Use of certain Ships' Rooms in the Town of Saint John in the island of Newfoundland; and for instituting Surrogate Courts on the Coast of Labrador, and in certain Islands adjacent thereto. (Repealed by Statute Law Revision Act 1873 (36 & 37 Vict. c. 91))
Quarantine Act 1811 (repealed)	51 Geo. 3. c. 46	31 May 1811
An Act to authorize the Officers of the Customs to act for the Superintendent of Quarantine, and his Assistant. (Repealed by Statute Law Revision Act 1873 (36 & 37 Vict. c. 91))
Commercial Treaty with Portugal Act 1811 (repealed)	51 Geo. 3. c. 47	31 May 1811
An Act for carrying into effect the Provisions of a Treaty of Amity, Commerce and Navigation, conducted between His Majesty and His Royal Highness the Prince Regent of Portugal. (Repealed by Statute Law Revision Act 1873 (36 & 37 Vict. c. 91))
Importation Act 1811 (repealed)	51 Geo. 3. c. 48	31 May 1811
An Act to permit Rum and other Spirits, the Produce of the British Colonies in the West Indies, to be imported into Lower Canada from Nova Scotia and New Brunswick, and the Islands of Gape Breton, Prince Edward and Newfoundland. (Repealed by Customs Law Repeal Act 1825 (6 Geo. 4. c. 105))
National Debt (No. 4) Act 1811 (repealed)	51 Geo. 3. c. 49	31 May 1811
An Act for raising the Sum of Twelve Millions by way of Annuities. (Repealed by Statute Law Revision Act 1870 (33 & 34 Vict. c. 69))
Exportation Act 1811 (repealed)	51 Geo. 3. c. 50	31 May 1811
An Act to allow a greater Number of Sheep to be carried from England to the Isle of Man than are now permitted by Law. (Repealed by Customs Law Repeal Act 1825 (6 Geo. 4. c. 105))
Prisage and Butlerage of Wines (Ireland) Act 1811 (repealed)	51 Geo. 3. c. 51	31 May 1811
An Act for abolishing the Duties of the Prizage and Butlerage of Wines in Ireland. (Repealed by Statute Law Revision Act 1873 (36 & 37 Vict. c. 91))
Isle of Man Customs Act 1811 (repealed)	51 Geo. 3. c. 52	31 May 1811
An Act for explaining and amending an Act passed in the last Session of Parliament, (Note: Isle of Man Customs Act 1810 (50 Geo. 3. c. 42)) for consolidating the Duties of Customs for the Isle of Man, and for placing the same under the Management of the Commissioners of Customs in England. (Repealed by Customs Law Repeal Act 1825 (6 Geo. 4. c. 105))
Exchequer Bills (No. 4) Act 1811 (repealed)	51 Geo. 3. c. 53	31 May 1811
An Act for raising the Sum of Six Millions, by Exchequer Bills, for the Service of Great Britain for the Year One thousand eight hundred and eleven. (Repealed by Statute Law Revision Act 1873 (36 & 37 Vict. c. 91))
Exchequer Bills (No. 5) Act 1811 (repealed)	51 Geo. 3. c. 54	31 May 1811
An Act for raising the Sum of One Million five hundred thousand Pounds, by Exchequer Bills, for the Service of Great Britain for the Year One thousand eight hundred and eleven. (Repealed by Statute Law Revision Act 1873 (36 & 37 Vict. c. 91))
Customs Act 1811 (repealed)	51 Geo. 3. c. 55	10 June 1811
An Act for abolishing the Superannuation Fund in the Department of the Customs, and for transferring the same to the Head of Consolidated Customs, and for authorizing the Payment of all retired Allowances on that Department out of Consolidated Customs. (Repealed by Statute Law Revision Act 1861 (24 & 25 Vict. c. 101))
Duties on Tobacco Act 1811 (repealed)	51 Geo. 3. c. 56	10 June 1811
An Act to grant additional Duties of Excise on Tobacco manufactured in Ireland. (Repealed by Statute Law Revision Act 1861 (24 & 25 Vict. c. 101))
Exportation (No. 2) Act 1811 (repealed)	51 Geo. 3. c. 57	10 June 1811
An Act to amend an Act made in the Forty seventh Year of His present Majesty's Reign, (Note: Export of Salted Beef, etc. (Ireland) Act 1807 (47 Geo. 3 Sess. 2. c. 10)) for encouraging tba Export of Salted Beef and Pork from Ireland. (Repealed by Statute Law Revision Act 1861 (24 & 25 Vict. c. 101))
Importation (No. 2) Act 1811 (repealed)	51 Geo. 3. c. 58	10 June 1811
An Act to allow the free Importation between Great Britain and Ireland of Home-made Chocolate; to prohibit the Importation of Foreign Chocolate into Ireland so long as the same shall be prohibited in Great Britain; and to grant certain Duties an Cocoa Nuts imported into Ireland. (Repealed by Customs Law Repeal Act 1825 (6 Geo. 4. c. 105))
Duties on Spirits Act 1811 (repealed)	51 Geo. 3. c. 59	10 June 1811
An Act for granting to His Majesty additional Duties of Excise on Wash and other Liquors used in the Distillation of Spirits and on foreign Spirits imported. (Repealed by Statute Law Revision Act 1861 (24 & 25 Vict. c. 101))
Duties on Hats, etc., Repeal (Ireland) Act 1811 (repealed)	51 Geo. 3. c. 60	10 June 1811
An Act to repeal the Duties of Stamps on Hats made in Ireland, and on Licences to Persons to manufacture Hats, or to utter or vend Hats in Ireland, and all Regulations for securing the said Duties. (Repealed by Statute Law Revision Act 1873 (36 & 37 Vict. c. 91))
Charge of Loan Act 1811 (repealed)	51 Geo. 3. c. 61	10 June 1811
An Act for charging the Sum of Seven Millions five hundred thousand Pounds, raised for the Service of Great Britain for the Year One thousand eight hundred and eleven, upon the Duties granted to His Majesty during the Continuance of the present War, and for certain Periods after the Ratification of a Definitive Treaty of Peace. (Repealed by Statute Law Revision Act 1861 (24 & 25 Vict. c. 101))
Importation (No. 3) Act 1811 (repealed)	51 Geo. 3. c. 62	10 June 1811
An Act to permit Rum and other Spirits, the Produce of the British Colonies in the West Indies, to be imported into Nova Scotia and New Brunswick, and the Islands of Cape Brêton, Prince Edward and Newfoundland, from the Island of Bermuda. (Repealed by Customs Law Repeal Act 1825 (6 Geo. 4. c. 105))
Prisoners (Ireland) Act 1811 (repealed)	51 Geo. 3. c. 63	10 June 1811
An Act to authorize the Punishment, by Confinement and hard Labour, of Persons in Ireland liable to Transportation; and, to repeal so much of a former Act as relates to that Subject. (Repealed by Statute Law Revision Act 1873 (36 & 37 Vict. c. 91))
East India Company Bonds Act 1811 (repealed)	51 Geo. 3. c. 64	10 June 1811
An Act to enable the East India Company to raise a further Sum of Money upon Bond, instead of increasing their Capital Stock; and to alter and amend an Act, passed in the Forty seventh Year of the Reign of His present Majesty, (Note: East India Company Act 1807 (47 Geo. 3 Sess. 2. c. 41)) relative thereto. (Repealed by East India Loans Act 1937 (c. 14))
Printers and Publishers Act 1811 (repealed)	51 Geo. 3. c. 65	10 June 1811
An Act to explain and amend an Act passed in the Thirty ninth Year of His Majesty's Reign, intituled "An Act for the more effectual Suppression of Societies established for seditious and treasonable Purposes, and for better preventing treasonable and seditious Practices," (Note: Unlawful Societies Act 1799 (39 Geo. 3. c. 79)) so for its respects certain Penalties on Printers and Publishers. (Repealed by Newspapers, Printers, and Reading Rooms Repeal Act 1869 (32 & 33 Vict. c. 24))
Irish Lighthouses Act 1811 (repealed)	51 Geo. 3. c. 66	10 June 1811
An Act to amend and render more effectual several Acts for promoting the Trade of Dublin, by rendering its Port and Harbour more commodious; and for erecting, repairing and maintaining Light Houses round the Coast of Ireland, and to raise a Fund for defraying the Charge thereof. (Repealed by Statute Law Revision Act 1873 (36 & 37 Vict. c. 91))
Customs Duties Act 1811 (repealed)	51 Geo. 3. c. 67	15 June 1811
An Act for repealing the Duties of Customs now payable on the Importation of Hides in the Hair, and granting new Duties in lieu thereof. (Repealed by Statute Law Revision Act 1861 (24 & 25 Vict. c. 101))
Customs Duties (No. 2) Act 1811 (repealed)	51 Geo. 3. c. 68	15 June 1811
An Act for charging an additional Duty on Verdigris imported. (Repealed by Statute Law Revision Act 1861 (24 & 25 Vict. c. 101))
Duties on Glass Act 1811 (repealed)	51 Geo. 3. c. 69	15 June 1811
An Act for repealing the Duty on the Materials used in making Flint and Phial Glass; and for granting, until the First Day of August One thousand eight hundred and twelve, other Duties in lieu thereof; and for continuing and amending an Act passed in the Forty ninth Year of His Majesty's Reign, intituled, "An Act for repealing the Duties on the Materials used in making Spread Window Glass and Crown Glass, and for granting other Duties in lieu thereof; and for the better Collection of the said Duties." (Note: Excise Act 1809 (49 Geo. 3. c. 63)) (Repealed by Glass Duties Act 1838 (1 & 2 Vict. c. 44))
Duty on Hats, etc., Repeal (Great Britain) Act 1811 (repealed)	51 Geo. 3. c. 70	15 June 1811
An Act for repealing the Hat Duty in Great Britain. (Repealed by Statute Law Revision Act 1873 (36 & 37 Vict. c. 91))
Customs (No. 2) Act 1811 (repealed)	51 Geo. 3. c. 71	15 June 1811
An Act for the Abolition and Regulation of certain Offices in the Customs. (Repealed by Customs Law Repeal Act 1825 (6 Geo. 4. c. 105))
Assessed Taxes Act 1811 (repealed)	51 Geo. 3. c. 72	15 June 1811
An Act for granting Exemptions in certain Cases from the Payment of the Duties charged in respect of Servants, Carriages, Horses and Dogs, kept in Great Britain and Ireland respectively. (Repealed by Statute Law Revision Act 1861 (24 & 25 Vict. c. 101))
Naval Arsenals Act 1811 (repealed)	51 Geo. 3. c. 73	15 June 1811
An Act for the better Security of His Majesty's Naval Arsenals in the River Medway, and Portsmouth and Hamoaze Harbours, and of His Majesty's Ships and Vessels lying at and resorting to the same. (Repealed by Harbours Act 1814 (54 Geo. 3. c. 159))
Prize Goods Act 1811 (repealed)	51 Geo. 3. c. 74	15 June 1811
An Act for authorizing the Sale of Prize Goods lodged in Warehouses after a certain Period. (Repealed by Statute Law Revision Act 1861 (24 & 25 Vict. c. 101))
East India Company Act 1811 (repealed)	51 Geo. 3. c. 75	15 June 1811
An Act for making further Provision far the Payment of Salaries and other Charges in the Office of the Commissioners for the Affairs of India; and for enabling the East India Company to restore to the Service of the said Company, Military Officers removed therefrom by Sentences of Courts Martial; and to authorize the said Company, in Cases of unforeseen Emergency, to take up Ships by private Contract. (Repealed by Statute Law Revision Act 1873 (36 & 37 Vict. c. 91) and Regulation of the Forces Act 1881 (44 & 45 Vict. c. 57))
Horse Duty Act 1811 (repealed)	51 Geo. 3. c. 76	15 June 1811
An Act for letting to Farm the Duties on Horses hired by the Mile or Stage, to be used in travellings and on Horses hired for a less Period of Time than Twenty eight Days, for drawing Carriages used in travelling Post or otherwise, in Great Britain; and for facilitating the Recovery of the said Duties. (Repealed by Statute Law Revision Act 1873 (36 & 37 Vict. c. 91))
Parliamentary Elections (Ireland) Act 1811 (repealed)	51 Geo. 3. c. 77	15 June 1811
An Act to amend the Laws for regulating the Election, in Ireland, of Members to serve in Parliament. (Repealed by Promissory Oaths Act 1871 (34 & 35 Vict. c. 48))
Relief of Families of Militiamen (Ireland) Act 1811 (repealed)	51 Geo. 3. c. 78	15 June 1811
An Act to make Provision in certain Cases for the Wives, and Families of Serjeants, Corporals, Drummers and Privates, serving in the Militia of Ireland. (Repealed by Militia (Voluntary Enlistment) Act 1875 (38 & 39 Vict. c. 69))
Lunatic Paupers, etc. (England) Act 1811 (repealed)	51 Geo. 3. c. 79	15 June 1811
An Act to amend an Act of the Forty eighth Year of His present Majesty, (Note: County Asylums Act 1808 (48 Geo. 3. c. 96)) for the better Care and Maintenance of Lunatics, being Paupers or Criminals, in England. (Repealed by County Lunatic Asylums (England) Act 1828 (9 Geo. 4. c. 40))
Parish Apprentices Act 1811 (repealed)	51 Geo. 3. c. 80	15 June 1811
An Act to render valid certain Indentures for the binding of Parish Apprentices. (Repealed by Statute Law Revision Act 1873 (36 & 37 Vict. c. 91))
Fees etc., in Public Offices, etc. (Ireland) Act 1811 (repealed)	51 Geo. 3. c. 81	15 June 1811
An Act to continue until the First Day of August One thousand eight hundred and twelve, certain Acts for appointing Commissioners to enquire into the Fees, Gratuities, Perquisites and Emoluments, received in several Public Offices in Ireland; to examine into any Abuses which may exist in the same, and into the Mode of receiving, collecting, issuing and accounting for Public Money in Ireland. (Repealed by Statute Law Revision Act 1873 (36 & 37 Vict. c. 91))
Rock Salt Act 1811 (repealed)	51 Geo. 3. c. 82	15 June 1811
An Act for establishing Regulations respecting Rock Salt delivered to the Refineries; for granting Relief for Salt lost at Sea by Shipwreck or Capture; and for reviving, amending and continuing, until the Twenty fifth Day of March One thousand eight hundred and fifteen, so much of an Act of the Forty first Year of His present Majesty (Note: Use of Salt Duty Free, etc. Act 1800 (41 Geo. 3. (G.B.). c. 21)) as allows the Use of Salt, Duty-free, for curing Fish in Bulk or in Barrels. (Repealed by Statute Law Revision Act 1861 (24 & 25 Vict. c. 101))
Drawback of Duty on Coals Act 1811 (repealed)	51 Geo. 3. c. 83	15 June 1811
An Act for allowing the like Drawback of Duty paid on Coals used in certain Mines and Smelting Mills in Devonshire, as is now allowed in the County of Cornwall. (Repealed by Customs Law Repeal Act 1825 (6 Geo. 4. c. 105))
Parliamentary Elections Act 1811 (repealed)	51 Geo. 3. c. 84	15 June 1811
An Act to explain an Act passed in the Twenty second Year of His present Majesty, (Note: Parliament Act 1782 (22 Geo. 3. c. 41)) for better securing the Freedom of Election of Members to serve in Parliament, by disabling certain Officers employed in the Collection or Management of His Majesty's Revenues from giving their Votes at such Elections, so far as relates to Coal Meters and Corn Meters of the City of London. (Repealed by Statute Law Revision Act 1873 (36 & 37 Vict. c. 91))
Exchequer Bills (No. 6) Act 1811 (repealed)	51 Geo. 3. c. 85	15 June 1811
An Act to enable the Commissioners of His Majesty's Treasury to issue Exchequer Bills, on the Credit of such Aids or Supplies as have been or shall be granted by Parliament for the Service of Great Britain for the Year One thousand eight hundred and eleven. (Repealed by Statute Law Revision Act 1873 (36 & 37 Vict. c. 91))
Exportation and Importation (No. 2) Act 1811 (repealed)	51 Geo. 3. c. 86	26 June 1811
An Act to continue, until the Fifth Day of July One thousand eight hundred and twelve, and to amend several Acts for granting certain Rates and Duties, and for allowing certain Drawbacks and Bounties on Goods, Wares and Merchandize imported. (Repealed by Statute Law Revision Act 1873 (36 & 37 Vict. c. 91))
Colouring of Porter Act 1811 (repealed)	51 Geo. 3. c. 87	26 June 1811
An Act for allowing the Manufacture and Use of a Liquor prepared from Sugar for colouring Porter, and for indemnifying Persons who have manufactured or used such Colouring. (Repealed by Beer Act 1816 (56 Geo. 3. c. 58))
Treasury Bills (Ireland) (No. 2) Act 1811 (repealed)	51 Geo. 3. c. 88	26 June 1811
An Act for raising the Sum of two hundred thousand Pounds by Treasury Bills for the Service of Ireland for the Year One thousand eight hundred and eleven. (Repealed by Statute Law Revision Act 1873 (36 & 37 Vict. c. 91))
Salary of Lord Lieutenant (Ireland) Act 1811 (repealed)	51 Geo. 3. c. 89	26 June 1811
An Act to increase the Salary of the Lord Lieutenant of Ireland. (Repealed by Statute Law Revision Act 1861 (24 & 25 Vict. c. 101))
Militia Pay (Ireland) Act 1811 (repealed)	51 Geo. 3. c. 90	26 June 1811
An Act for defraying, until the Twenty fifth Day of March One thousand eight hundred and twelve, the Charge of the Pay and Clothing of the Militia of Ireland; and for making Allowances in certain Cases to Subaltern Officers of the said Militia during Peace. (Repealed by Statute Law Revision Act 1873 (36 & 37 Vict. c. 91))
Arrears of Crown Rents (Ireland) Act 1811 (repealed)	51 Geo. 3. c. 91	26 June 1811
An Act for discharging certain Arrears of Quit, Crown and Composition Rents, which have been growing due in Ireland. (Repealed by Statute Law Revision Act 1873 (36 & 37 Vict. c. 91))
Highways (Ireland) (No. 2) Act 1811 (repealed)	51 Geo. 3. c. 92	26 June 1811
An Act to repeal certain Parts of several Acts of the Parliament of Ireland, relating to the Tolls on Stage Coaches, carrying above a certain Number of Passengers, and to make other Provisions in lien thereof. (Repealed by Statute Law Revision Act 1873 (36 & 37 Vict. c. 91))
Duties on Norway Timber Act 1811 (repealed)	51 Geo. 3. c. 93	26 June 1811
An Act for granting additional Duties of Customs on Fir Timber, of certain Dimensions, of the Growth of Norway imported into Great Britain. (Repealed by Statute Law Revision Act 1861 (24 & 25 Vict. c. 101))
Preservation of Timber Act 1811 (repealed)	51 Geo. 3. c. 94	26 June 1811
An Act to continue, until the Twenty ninth Day of July One thousand eight hundred and thirteen, an Act of the last session of Parliament, (Note: New Forest Act 1810 (50 Geo. 3. c. 116)) intituled, "An Act to extend and amend the Term and Provisions of an Act of the Thirty ninth and Fortieth Tear of His present Majesty, (Note: New Forest Act 1800 (39 & 40 Geo. 3. c. 86)) for the better Preservation of Timber in the New Forest; and for ascertaining the Boundaries of the said Forest, and the Lands of the Crown within the same." (Repealed by Statute Law Revision Act 1873 (36 & 37 Vict. c. 91))
Excise, etc. Act 1811 (repealed)	51 Geo. 3. c. 95	26 June 1811
An Act to explain and amend certain Laws of Excise respecting the Duties on Estates and Goods sold by Auction; the allowing Dealers to roast their own Coffee on certain Conditions; and to the Water Mark of the Year on Paper intended for Exportation. (Repealed by Statute Law Revision Act 1873 (36 & 37 Vict. c. 91))
Customs (No. 3) Act 1811 (repealed)	51 Geo. 3. c. 96	26 June 1811
An Act to extend the Powers veiled in the Commissioners of the Customs of restoring Vessels and Goods seized, to Seizures made by virtue of any Acts relating to the Department of the Customs. (Repealed by Customs Law Repeal Act 1825 (6 Geo. 4. c. 105))
Trade, Europe and American Colonies Act 1811 (repealed)	51 Geo. 3. c. 97	26 June 1811
An Act to regulate the Trade between Places in Europe South of Cape Finisterre, and certain Ports in the British Colonies in North America. (Repealed by Trade Act (No. 2) 1822 (3 Geo. 4. c. 45))
Indemnity (No. 3) Act 1811 (repealed)	51 Geo. 3. c. 98	26 June 1811
An Act to indemnify such Persons in the United Kingdom, as have omitted to give Securities and to register Memorials thereof, under an Act of the last Session of Parliament, (Note: Government Offices Security Act 1810 (50 Geo. 3. c. 85)) and for extending the times limited for those Purposes respectively, until Two Months after the Commencement of the next Session of Parliament. (Repealed by Promissory Oaths Act 1871 (34 & 35 Vict. c. 48))
Parliamentary Elections (No. 2) Act 1811 (repealed)	51 Geo. 3. c. 99	26 June 1811
An Act for removing Doubts as to the registering of certain Property purchased or sold under the Land Tax Redemption Act, (Note: Land Tax Redemption Act 1802 (42 Geo. 3. c. 116)) in right of which Persons may claim to vote at Elections of Members to serve in Parliament. (Repealed by Statute Law Revision Act 1873 (36 & 37 Vict. c. 91))
Counties of Cities Act 1811 (repealed)	51 Geo. 3. c. 100	26 June 1811
An Act to amend an Act passed in the Thirty eighth Year of His present Majesty's Reign, intituled, "An Act to regulate the Trial of Causes, Indictments and other Proceedings which arise within the Counties of certain Cities and Towns Corporate within this Kingdom." (Note: Counties of Cities Act 1798 (38 Geo. 3. c. 52)) (Repealed by Courts Act 1971 (c. 23))
British White Herring Fishery Act 1811 (repealed)	51 Geo. 3. c. 101	26 June 1811
An Act for amending an Act of the Forty eighth Year of His present Majesty, (Note: Herring Fishery (Scotland) Act 1808 (48 Geo. 3. c. 110)) for regulating the British White Herring Fishery. (Repealed by Sea Fisheries Act 1868 (31 & 32 Vict. c. 45))
General de Lancey (Estates and Crown Claims) Act 1811 (repealed)	51 Geo. 3. c. 102	26 June 1811
An Act to extend the Provisions of an Act passed in the Forty seventh Year of His present Majesty, (Note: General de Lancey (Crown Claims) Act 1807 (47 Geo. 3 Sess. 2. c. 69)) for discharging from the Claims of the Crown certain Real and Personal Estates belonging to General De Lancey, late Barrack Master General, and vested in Trustees for Sale; and also for vesting and settling certain Lands heretofore contracted to be purchased by the said General De Lancey in Trustees, to be sold for Payment of a Debt due to the Crown, and for other Purposes relative thereto. (Repealed by Statute Law Revision Act 1950 (14 Geo. 6. c. 6))
Retirement of Officers on Half Pay Act 1811 (repealed)	51 Geo. 3. c. 103	26 June 1811
An Act to authorize the allowing Officers to retire on Half Pay or other Allowances under certain Restrictions. (Repealed by Statute Law Revision Act 1873 (36 & 37 Vict. c. 91) and Regulation of the Forces Act 1881 (44 & 45 Vict. c. 57))
Forfeited and Unclaimed Prize Money Act 1811 (repealed)	51 Geo. 3. c. 104	26 June 1811
An Act for extending and amending the Regulations now in Force, (Note: Prize Money Act 1809 (49 Geo. 3. c. 123)) relative to the Payment to the Royal Hospital at Chelsea of the forfeited and unclaimed Shares of Army Prize Money. (Repealed by Army Prize Money Act 1814 (54 Geo. 3. c. 86))
Royal Naval Asylum Act 1811 (repealed)	51 Geo. 3. c. 105	26 June 1811
An Act to enable Persons to bequeath Lands and Tenements to the Commissioners for the Government of The Royal Naval Asylum, and to authorize the said Commissioners to hold the same for the Benefit of the said Asylum; and for amending an Act made in the Forty seventh Year of His present Majesty (Note: Greenwich Hospital Act 1807 (47 Geo. 3 Sess. 1. c. 52)) relating to the said Asylum. (Repealed by Greenwich Hospital Outpensions, etc. Act 1829 (10 Geo. 4. c. 26))
Army Act 1811 (repealed)	51 Geo. 3. c. 106	26 June 1811
An Act for enabling the Wives and Families of Soldiers embarked for Foreign Service, to return to their Homes. (Repealed by Army Act 1832 (2 & 3 Will. 4. c. 97))
Militia and Local Militia Pay (Great Britain) Act 1811 (repealed)	51 Geo. 3. c. 107	26 June 1811
An Act for defraying the Charge of the Pay and Clothing of the Militia and Local Militia in Great Britain for the Year One thousand eight hundred and eleven. (Repealed by Statute Law Revision Act 1873 (36 & 37 Vict. c. 91))
Militia Allowances Act 1811 (repealed)	51 Geo. 3. c. 108	26 June 1811
An Act to revive and continue, until the Twenty fifth Day of March One thousand eight hundred and twelve, and amend so much of an Act, made in the Thirty ninth and Fortieth Year of His present Majesty, (Note: Militia Allowances Act 1800 (39 & 40 Geo. 3. c. 44)) as grants certain Allowances to Adjutants and Serjeant Majors of the Militia of England, disembodied under an Act of the same Session of Parliament. (Note: Militia Act 1799 (39 & 40 Geo. 3. c. 1)) (Repealed by Statute Law Revision Act 1873 (36 & 37 Vict. c. 91))
Militia Allowances (No. 2) Act 1811 (repealed)	51 Geo. 3. c. 109	26 June 1811
An Act for making Allowances in certain cases to Subaltern Officers of the Militia in Great Britain, while disembodied. (Repealed by Statute Law Revision Act 1873 (36 & 37 Vict. c. 91))
Counterfeiting Bank of England Tokens Act 1811 (repealed)	51 Geo. 3. c. 110	26 June 1811
An Act to prevent the counterfeiting of Silver Pieces denominated Tokens, intended to be issued and circulated by the Governor and Company of the Bank of England, for the respective Sums of Five Shillings and Six Pence, Three Shillings, and One Shilling and Six Pence; and to prevent the bringing into the Kingdom or uttering any such counterfeit Pieces or Tokens. (Repealed by Statute Law Revision Act 1861 (24 & 25 Vict. c. 101))
Manufacture of Maidstone Geneva, etc. Act 1811 (repealed)	51 Geo. 3. c. 111	26 June 1811
An Act for permitting Sir William Bishop and George Bishop to continue, until the Fifth Day of July One thousand eight hundred and thirteen, the Manufacture of Maidstone Geneva; for charging the same with certain Duties; and for rectifying a Mistake in an Act of this Session, (Note: Distillers of Spirits Act 1811 (51 Geo. 3. c. 42)) for empowering the Lords Commissioners of the Treasury to exonerate Distillers of Spirits from Sugar from the Excess of Duties therein mentioned. (Repealed by Statute Law Revision Act 1873 (36 & 37 Vict. c. 91))
Exchequer Bills (No. 7) Act 1811 (repealed)	51 Geo. 3. c. 112	26 June 1811
An Act for enabling His Majesty to raise the Sum of Three Millions for the Service of Great Britain. (Repealed by Statute Law Revision Act 1873 (36 & 37 Vict. c. 91))
Lotteries Act 1811 (repealed)	51 Geo. 3. c. 113	26 June 1811
An Act for granting to His Majesty a Sum of Money to be raised by Lotteries. (Repealed by Statute Law Revision Act 1873 (36 & 37 Vict. c. 91))
Militia (Stannaries) Act 1811 (repealed)	51 Geo. 3. c. 114	26 June 1811
An Act to permit the Services of the Regiment of Miners of Cornwall and Devon to be extended to Ireland. (Repealed by Militia Act 1882 (45 & 46 Vict. c. 49))
Gifts for Churches Act 1811	51 Geo. 3. c. 115	26 June 1811
An Act for amending the Act Forty-third George Third, (Note: Gifts for Churches Act 1803 (43 Geo. 3. c. 108)) to promote the building, repairing, or otherwise providing the churches and Chapels, and of Houses for the Residence of Ministers, and the providing of Church Yards and Glebes. (Repealed for Ireland by Church of Ireland Acts Repeal Act 1851 (14 & 15 Vict. c. 71))
Tower Burial Ground Act 1811	51 Geo. 3. c. 116	26 June 1811
An Act to enable His Majesty to grant a Piece of Ground within the Tower of London, to be used as an additional Burial Ground for Persons dying within the said Tower.
Appropriation Act 1811 (repealed)	51 Geo. 3. c. 117	26 June 1811
An Act for granting to His Majesty certain Sums of Money out of the Consolidated Fund of Great Britain; and for applying certain Monies therein mentioned, for the Service of the Year One thousand eight hundred and eleven; and for further appropriating the Supplies granted in this Session of Parliament. (Repealed by Statute Law Revision Act 1873 (36 & 37 Vict. c. 91))
Militia (No. 2) Act 1811 or the Militia (Interchange) Act 1811 (repealed)	51 Geo. 3. c. 118	1 July 1811
An Act to permit the Interchange of the British and Irish Militias respectively. (Repealed by Militia Act 1882 (45 & 46 Vict. c. 49))
Justice of the Peace, Metropolis Act 1811 (repealed)	51 Geo. 3. c. 119	1 July 1811
An Act for repealing Two Acts made in the Forty second (Note: Metropolitan Police Magistrates Act 1802 (42 Geo. 3. c. 76)) and Forty seventh (Note: Police Magistrates, Metropolis Act 1807 (47 Geo. 3 Sess. 2. c. 42)) Years of His present Majesty, for the more effectual Administration of the Office of a Justice of the Peace, in such Parts of the Counties of Middlesex and Surrey as lie in or near the Metropolis, and for the more effectual Prevention of Felonies; and for making other Provisions in lieu thereof; to continue in force until the First Day of June One thousand eight hundred and thirteen, and from thence until the Expiration of Six Weeks from the Commencement of the then next Session of Parliament. (Repealed by Statute Law Revision Act 1873 (36 & 37 Vict. c. 91))
Deer Stealing (England) Act 1811 (repealed)	51 Geo. 3. c. 120	1 July 1811
An Act to amend an Act of the Forty seventh Year of His present Majesty, (Note: Deer Stealing (England) Act 1802 (42 Geo. 3. c. 107)) for more effectually preventing the stealing of Deer. (Repealed by Criminal Statutes Repeal Act 1827 (7 & 8 Geo. 4. c. 27) and for India by Criminal Law (India) Act 1828 (9 Geo. 4. c. 74))
Drawbacks on Spirits Act 1811 (repealed)	51 Geo. 3. c. 121	2 July 1811
An Act to suspend the Payment of all Drawbacks on Spirits made or distilled in Great Britain or Ireland, and exported from either Country to the other respectively; and to suspend the Importation into Great Britain of any Spirits made or distilled in Ireland, except such as shall have been warehoused according to Law; and for regulating the Exportation of Home-made Spirits from Great Britain to Ireland and from Ireland to Great Britain, until Three Months after the Commencement of the next Session of Parliament. (Repealed by Statute Law Revision Act 1873 (36 & 37 Vict. c. 91))
Bogs (Ireland) Act 1811 (repealed)	51 Geo. 3. c. 122	2 July 1811
An Act to continue, until the First Day of January One thousand eight hundred and thirteen, an Act (Note: Drainage of Bogs, etc. (Ireland) Act 1809 (49 Geo. 3. c. 102)) for appointing Commissioners to enquire and examine into the Nature and Extent of the several Bogs in Ireland, and the Practicability of draining and cultivating them, and the best means of effecting the same. (Repealed by Statute Law Revision Act 1873 (36 & 37 Vict. c. 91))
Insolvent Debtors Relief (Ireland) Act 1811 (repealed)	51 Geo. 3. c. 123	2 July 1811
An Act for the Relief of certain Insolvent Debtors in Ireland. (Repealed by Statute Law Revision Act 1873 (36 & 37 Vict. c. 91))
Frivolous Arrests Act 1811 (repealed)	51 Geo. 3. c. 124	2 July 1811
An Act further to extend and render more effectual certain Provisions of an Act passed in the Twelfth Year of the Reign of His late Majesty King George the First, intituled, "An Act to prevent frivolous and vexatious Arrests;" (Note: Frivolous Arrests Act 1725 (12 Geo. 1. c. 29)) and of an Act passed in the Fifth Year of the Reign of His Majesty King George the Second, (Note: Process for Small Debts Act 1731 (5 Geo. 2. c. 27)) to explain, amend and render more effectual the said former Act; and of Two Acts passed in the Nineteenth (Note: Inferior Courts Act 1779 (19 Geo. 3. c. 70)) and Forty third (Note: Costs Act 1803 (43 Geo. 3. c. 46)) Years of the Reign of His present Majesty, extending the Provisions of the said former Acts. (Repealed by Statute Law Revision Act 1873 (36 & 37 Vict. c. 91))
Insolvent Debtors Relief (England) Act 1811 (repealed)	51 Geo. 3. c. 125	9 July 1811
An Act for the Relief of certain Insolvent Debtors in England. (Repealed by Statute Law Revision Act 1873 (36 & 37 Vict. c. 91))
Westminster Parliamentary Elections Act 1811 (repealed)	51 Geo. 3. c. 126	9 July 1811
An Act to extend an Act made in the Eighteenth Year of His late Majesty King George the Second, (Note: Parliamentary Elections Act 1744 (18 Geo. 2. c. 18)) to explain and amend the Laws touching the Elections of Knights of the Shire to serve in Parliament for England, respecting the Expences of Hustings and Poll Clerks, so far as regards the City of Westminster. (Repealed by Statute Law Revision Act 1873 (36 & 37 Vict. c. 91))
Gold Currency and Bank Notes Act 1811 (repealed)	51 Geo. 3. c. 127	24 July 1811
An Act for making more effectual Provision for preventing the Current Gold Coin of the Realm from being paid or accepted for a greater Value than the Current Value of such Coin; for preventing any Note or Bill of the Governor and Company of the Bank of England from being received for any smaller Sum than the Sum therein specified; and for staying Proceedings upon any Distress by Tender of such Notes. (Repealed by Statute Law Revision Act 1873 (36 & 37 Vict. c. 91))
Militia (No. 3) Act 1811 or the Interchange Act 1811 (repealed)	51 Geo. 3. c. 128	24 July 1811
An Act to explain an Act passed in this present Session of Parliament, intituled, "An Act to permit the Interchange of the British and Irish Militias respectively." (Note: Militia (No. 2) Act 1811 (51 Geo. 3. c. 118)) (Repealed by Statute Law Revision Act 1873 (36 & 37 Vict. c. 91))

=== Local acts ===
Short title	Citation	Royal assent
Long title
East Grinstead Parish Church Act 1811	51 Geo. 3. c. i	8 March 1811
An Act for enlarging the Powers of an Act of His present Majesty (Note: East Grinstead Church Act 1790 (30 Geo. 3. c. 79)) for rebuilding the Parish Church of East Grinstead, in the County of Sussex.
Buckingham to Hanwell Road Act 1811 (repealed)	51 Geo. 3. c. ii	22 March 1811
An Act for more effectually repairing the Road from the Sessions House in the Town of Buckingham, to Hanwell, in the County of Oxford. (Repealed by Buckingham to Hanwell (Oxfordshire) Road Act 1832 (2 & 3 Will. 4. c. xxxiv))
Sunderland and Durham Road Act 1811 (repealed)	51 Geo. 3. c. iii	22 March 1811
An Act to continue the Term and enlarge the Powers of Three Acts of the Twentieth Year of His late Majesty, (Note: Sunderland to Durham Road Act 1746 (20 Geo. 2. c. 13)) and the Eighth (Note: Sunderland to Durham Road Act 1768 (8 Geo. 3. c. 42)) and Twenty ninth (Note: Sunderland to Durham Roads Act 1789 (29 Geo. 3. c. 80)) Years of His present Majesty, for repairing the Road from Sunderland near the Sea to the City of Durham. (Repealed by Sunderland and Durham Road Act 1831 (1 & 2 Will. 4. c. lxiv))
Road from Beverley and from Malton Guide Post Act 1811 (repealed)	51 Geo. 3. c. iv	22 March 1811
An Act for enlarging the Term and Powers of Two Acts of His present Majesty, (Note: Beverley to Hessle Ferry Turnpike Act 1769 (9 Geo. 3. c. 79)) (Note: Beverley to Hessle Ferry Turnpike Act 1774 (14 Geo. 3. c. 117)) for repairing and widening the Road from Beverley to the Ferry at Hessle, and from the Malton Guide Post to the Gravel Pit at Cottingham, in the County of York. (Repealed by Beverley, Hessle and North Cave Turnpike Roads (Yorkshire) Act 1832 (2 & 3 Will. 4. c. cix))
Odiham and Farnham Road Act 1811 (repealed)	51 Geo. 3. c. v	22 March 1811
An Act for enlarging the Term and Powers of an Act of His present Majesty, (Note: Odiham to Farnham Roads Act 1789 (29 Geo. 3. c. 89)) for repairing the Road from Odiham, in the County of Southampton, to Farnham, in the County of Surrey. (Repealed by Odiham and Farnham Road Act 1832 (2 & 3 Will. 4. c. xxx))
Bishop Wearmouth and Norton Road Act 1811 (repealed)	51 Geo. 3. c. vi	22 March 1811
An Act for continuing and amending an Act of His present Majesty, (Note: Bishop Wearmouth and Norton Road Act 1789 (29 Geo. 3. c. 81)) for repairing the Road from Bishop Wearmouth to Norton, in the County of Durham. (Repealed by Bishop Wearmouth and Norton (Durham) Road Act 1832 (2 & 3 Will. 4. c. lxi))
Rangeworthy Inclosure Act 1811	51 Geo. 3. c. vii	22 March 1811
An Act for inclosing Lands in the Hamlet of Rangeworthy, in the Parish of Thornbury, in the County of Gloucester.
Ware Improvement Act 1811	51 Geo. 3. c. viii	25 March 1811
An Act for lighting watching and improving the Streets and other public Passages within the Town of Ware, in the County of Hertford.
Bury St. Edmund's Improvement Act 1811 (repealed)	51 Geo. 3. c. ix	4 April 1811
An Act for better paving, lighting, cleansing, watching and otherwise improving the Town of Bury Saint Edmund's, in the County of Suffolk. (Repealed by Local Government Board's Provisional Orders Confirmation Act (No. 6) 1873 (36 & 37 Vict. c. ccxvi))
Barton and Brandon Road Act 1811 (repealed)	51 Geo. 3. c. x	4 April 1811
An Act for enlarging the Term and Powers of Two Acts of His present Majesty, (Note: Barton and Brandon Road Act 1770 (10 Geo. 3. c. 65)) (Note: Barton and Brandon Road Act 1789 (29 Geo. 3. c. 94)) for repairing the Road from the Bridge on the Old River at Barton (Note: Barton Mills, Suffolk. 52°20′09″N 0°31′55″E) to Brandon Bridge, (Note: Brandon Bridge carrying the A1065 Brandon High Street across the River Little Ouse, Brandon, Suffolk. 52°27′04″N 0°37′23″E) in the County of Suffolk. (Repealed by Barton and Brandon Bridge Road (Suffolk) Act 1831 (1 & 2 Will. 4. c. xix))
Croydon Canal Act 1811	51 Geo. 3. c. xi	4 April 1811
An Act for enabling the Company of Proprietors of the Croydon Canal to raise Money to complete the said Canal and Works, and for amending the former Acts passed relative thereto.
Roads in Carmarthenshire Act 1811	51 Geo. 3. c. xii	4 April 1811
An Act for continuing the Term, and altering and amending the Powers of Two Acts of His present Majesty, (Note: Carmarthen Roads Act 1792 (32 Geo. 3. c. 156)) (Note: Roads in Carmarthenshire Act 1801 (41 Geo. 3. (U.K.) c. v)) for repairing the Road from Golden Grove Park to the Turnpike Road leading from the new Bridge to the Lime Kilns, and other Roads in the said Acts mentioned, in the County of Carmarthen; and for making Two new Branches of Road to communicate with the said Roads.
Road from Hyde Park Corner to Counters Bridge Act 1811 (repealed)	51 Geo. 3. c. xiii	4 April 1811
An Act for enlarging the Term and Powers of an Act of His present Majesty, (Note: Kensington Road Act 1795 (35 Geo. 3. c. 142)) for repairing the Road from Hyde Park Corner to Counter's Bridge, and certain other Roads in the County of Middlesex. (Repealed by Road from Knightsbridge to Counters Bridge Act 1825 (6 Geo. 4. c. clvii))
Road from Carlisle to Newcastle-upon-Tyne Act 1811 (repealed)	51 Geo. 3. c. xiv	4 April 1811
An Act for altering and enlarging the Powers of so much of an Act of His late Majesty, (Note: Carlisle and Newcastle Road Act 1750 (24 Geo. 2. c. 25)) for making a Road for the Passage of Troops and Carriages, from the City of Carlisle to the Town of Newcastle upon Tyne, as relates to the County of Cumberland. (Repealed by Annual Turnpike Acts Continuance Act 1877 (40 & 41 Vict. c. 64))
Nethergate (Dundee) Improvement Act 1811	51 Geo. 3. c. xv	4 April 1811
An Act for widening and improving the Street called Nethergate, in the Burgh of Dundee, in the County of Forfar.
Roads from the South Gate of King's Lynn Act 1811 (repealed)	51 Geo. 3. c. xvi	4 April 1811
An Act to enlarge the Term and Powers of Two Acts of His present Majesty, (Note: Norfolk Roads (No. 2) Act 1770 (10 Geo. 3. c. 85)) (Note: Norfolk Roads (No. 2) Act 1791 (31 Geo. 3. c. 112)) for repairing the Roads from the South Gate of King's Lynn, into the Parishes of East Walton, Narborough, Stoke Ferry and Downham Market, in the County of Norfolk. (Repealed by King's Lynn Roads Act 1831 (1 & 2 Will. 4. c. xx))
Roads from the East Gate of King's Lynn Act 1811 (repealed)	51 Geo. 3. c. xvii	4 April 1811
An Act to enlarge the Term and Powers of Two Acts of His present Majesty, (Note: Norfolk Roads (No. 3) Act 1770 (10 Geo. 3. c. 86)) (Note: Norfolk Roads (No. 3) Act 1791 (31 Geo. 3. c. 113)) for repairing the Roads from the East Gate of King's Lynn, to the North End of Babingley Lane, and to extend the Road from thence to Darsingham, in the County of Norfolk. (Repealed by King's Lynn and Castle Rising Roads Act 1831 (1 & 2 Will. 4. c. xxi))
Livingstone and Glasgow Road Act 1811 (repealed)	51 Geo. 3. c. xviii	4 April 1811
An Act for altering and enlarging the Powers of several Acts (Note: Ayr Roads Act 1791 (31 Geo. 3. c. 107)) (Note: Edinburgh Linlithgow and Lanark Roads etc Act 1792 (32 Geo. 3. c. 120)) (Note: Livingstone and Glasgow Road Act 1799 (39 Geo. 3. c. xlv)) for making and repairing the Roads from Livingstone, by the Kirk of Shotts, to the City of Glasgow, and other Roads and Bridges therein mentioned. (Repealed by Livingston and Glasgow Road Act 1814 (54 Geo. 3. c. ccii))
Shankhill and Waterford Road Act 1811 (repealed)	51 Geo. 3. c. xix	4 April 1811
An Act for repairing the Road leading from Shankhill in the County of Kilkenny, to the City of Waterford. (Repealed by Shankhill (County Kilkenny) and Waterford Road Act 1832 (2 & 3 Will. 4. c. lix))
Almond Bridge Roads Act 1811 (repealed)	51 Geo. 3. c. xx	4 April 1811
An Act for altering and enlarging the Powers of Three Acts of His present Majesty, (Note: Edinburgh Linlithgow and Lanark Roads etc Act 1792 (32 Geo. 3. c. 120)) (Note: Edinburgh etc. Roads Act 1795 (35 Geo. 3. c. 150)) (Note: Almond Bridge and Ballieston Roads Act 1798 (38 Geo. 3. c. xxxvi)) for making and repairing the Roads from the New Bridge over the Water of Almond, on the Confines of the Counties of Edinburgh and Linlithgow, by the Town of Bathgate to Baillieston, in the County of Lanark, and several other Roads mentioned in the said Acts. (Repealed by Almond Bridge and Baillieston Road Act 1831 (1 Will. 4. c. xliii))
Whickham Inclosure Act 1811	51 Geo. 3. c. xxi	4 April 1811
An Act for inclosing Lands in the Parish of Whickham, in the County of Durham.
Barnham Broom and Bickerstone Inclosures Act 1811	51 Geo. 3. c. xxii	4 April 1811
An Act for inclosing Lands in the Parish of Barnham Broom, and Parish or Hamlet of Bickerstone, in the County of Norfolk.
Finchley Inclosures Act 1811	51 Geo. 3. c. xxiii	4 April 1811
An Act for inclosing Lands in the Parish of Finchley, in the County of Middlesex.
Lune, Holwick and Romaldkirk Inclosures Act 1811	51 Geo. 3. c. xxiv	4 April 1811
An Act for inclosing and exonerating from Tythes, Lands in the Townships of Lune, Holwick and Romaldkirk, in the North Riding of the County of York.
Chadlington West, Chadlington East and Chilson Inclosures Act 1811	51 Geo. 3. c. xxv	4 April 1811
An Act for inclosing certain Lands in the Hamlets of Chadlington West, Chadlington East and Chilson, in the Parish of Charlbury, in the County of Oxford.
Bywell St. Peter Inclosure Act 1811	51 Geo. 3. c. xxvi	4 April 1811
An Act for inclosing Lands in the Parish of Bywell Saint Peter, in the County of Northumberland.
Norwich, Aylsham and Cromer Road Act 1811 (repealed)	51 Geo. 3. c. xxvii	11 April 1811
An Act to continue and amend an Act of His present Majesty, (Note: Norfolk Roads Act 1794 (34 Geo. 3. c. 114)) for repairing the Road from Norwich to Aylsham, in the County of Norfolk; and to make and maintain the Road from Aylsham to Cromer, and Part of the Road leading towards Wolterton, branching off from the Cromer Road, to the Eagle Inn in Erpingham, in the said County. (Repealed by Norwich and Cromer Road Act 1831 (1 & 2 Will. 4. c. xiv))
Road from Dudley to Pattingham Act 1811 (repealed)	51 Geo. 3. c. xxviii	11 April 1811
An Act for enlarging the Term and Powers of an Act of His present Majesty, (Note: Worcester Salop and Stafford Roads Act 1790 (30 Geo. 3. c. 102)) for repairing the Road from Dudley to the New Inn, Pattingham, and also the Road from Shut End, to join the Wolverhampton Turnpike Road, in the Counties of Worcester, Stafford and Salop. (Repealed by Dudley and New Inn District of Roads Act 1832 (2 & 3 Will. 4. c. lxxxv))
Road from Harlow Bush Act 1811 (repealed)	51 Geo. 3. c. xxix	11 April 1811
An Act for enlarging the Term and Powers of several Acts (Note: Essex Roads Act 1723 (10 Geo. 1. c. 9)) (Note: Epping and Ongar Road Act 1742 (16 Geo. 2. c. 19)) (Note: Epping and Ongar Road Act 1769 (9 Geo. 3. c. 63)) (Note: Epping and Ongar Road Act 1787 (27 Geo. 3. c. 69)) for repairing the Road from Harlow Bush Common, (Note: Harlow, Essex.) in the Parish of Harlow, to Woodford, (Note: Woodford, now in Greater London, historically in Essex.) in the County of Essex, and the Road from Epping, through the Parishes of Northweald, Bassett, Bobbingworth, High Ongar, Chipping Ongar and Shelley, to the Four Want Way, in the Parish of Shelley, and from thence through the Parishes of High Ongar and Norton Mandeville, to the Parish of Writtle, in the said County. (Repealed by Road from Harlow Act 1822 (3 Geo. 4. c. xliv))
Hatfield, Thorne and Fishlake Inclosures Act 1811	51 Geo. 3. c. xxx	11 April 1811
An Act for inclosing Lands in the Parishes of Hatfield, Thorne and Fishlake, in the Manor of Haitefeld, in the West Riding of the County of York.
Barton Bridge and Stretford Road Act 1811 (repealed)	51 Geo. 3. c. xxxi	6 May 1811
An Act for amending the Road from Barton Bridge into the Manchester and Altrincham Turnpike Road; and also a Branch therefrom, into the said Turnpike Road; all in the County of Lancaster. (Repealed by Road from Barton Bridge to the Manchester and Altrincham Road Act 1832 (2 & 3 Will. 4. c. xxviii))
Christchurch (Surrey) Poor Rates and Improvement Act 1811 (repealed)	51 Geo. 3. c. xxxii	6 May 1811
An Act for better assessing and collecting the Poor and other Rates in the Parish of Christ Church in the County of Surrey; for better regulating the Poor thereof; and for cleansing, watching, lighting and otherwise improving the Streets, Lanes and other Public Passages and Places in the said Parish, and for other Purposes relating thereto. (Repealed by London Government (Borough of Southwark) Order in Council 1901 (SR&O 1901/275))
Dunure Harbour Act 1811	51 Geo. 3. c. xxxiii	6 May 1811
An Act for erecting and maintaining a Harbour and Works connected therewith, at Dunure, in the County of Ayr.
Perth Improvement Act 1811 (repealed)	51 Geo. 3. c. xxxiv	6 May 1811
An Act for paving, lighting and cleansing the City of Perth, and for maintaining Police and good Order within the said City. (Repealed by Perth Improvement Act 1839 (2 & 3 Vict. c. xliii))
Kirkcaldy Improvement and Water Act 1811 (repealed)	51 Geo. 3. c. xxxv	6 May 1811
An Act for widening, paving, improving and keeping in Repair the Streets, Lanes and other Passages in the Royal Burgh of Kirkcaldy, in the County of Fife, for the better supplying the Inhabitants thereof with Water; and for other Purposes of Utility to the said Burgh. (Repealed by Kirkcaldy Corporation Order Confirmation Act 1939 (2 & 3 Geo. 6. c. vi))
Dublin Roads Act 1811	51 Geo. 3. c. xxxvi	6 May 1811
An Act to amend an Act made in the Parliament of Ireland, in the Twenty sixth Year of His present Majesty, (Note: County Dublin Roads Act 1786 (26 Geo. 3. c. 14 (I))) for making and repairing Public Roads in the County of Dublin, with respect to the Roads within those Parts of the Baronies of Uppercross and Newcastle, which are situate on the South East Side of the great Turnpike Road leading from Dublin to Cork, by Rathcoole and Naas.
Dumfries Two Pennies Scots Act 1811 (repealed)	51 Geo. 3. c. xxxvii	6 May 1811
An Act for continuing several Acts for laying a Duty of Two Pennies Scots, or One Sixth Part of a Penny Sterling, on every Pint of Ale, Beer or Porter, that shall be Tended or sold within the Town of Dumfries and Privileges thereof. (Repealed by Statute Law (Repeals) Act 2013 (c. 2))
Bridge of Doon Act 1811 (repealed)	51 Geo. 3. c. xxxviii	6 May 1811
An Act for building and maintaining a Bridge over the Water of Doon, which runs between the parishes of Ayr and Maybole, in the County of Ayr. (Repealed by Ayr (County) Turnpike Roads Act 1827 (7 & 8 Geo. 4. c. cix))
Marykirk (North Esk) Bridge Act 1811	51 Geo. 3. c. xxxix	6 May 1811
An Act for building a Bridge over the River North Esk near the Village of Marykirk, in the County of Kincardine.
Roads in Berwick (County) and Whitadder Bridge Act 1811 (repealed)	51 Geo. 3. c. xl	6 May 1811
An Act for more effectually repairing certain Roads in the County of Berwick, and for building a Bridge over the River Whitadder, in the said County. (Repealed by Roads and Bridges in Berwick (County) Act 1832 (2 & 3 Will. 4. c. lvi))
Berwick-upon-Tweed and Dunglas Bridge Road and Branches Act 1811 (repealed)	51 Geo. 3. c. xli	6 May 1811
An Act to continue and enlarge the Term and Powers of Two Acts of His present Majesty, (Note: Berwick Roads Act 1787 (27 Geo. 3. c. 89)) (Note: Road from Berwick-upon-Tweed and Roads from Billie Causeway Act 1805 (45 Geo. 3. c. lvi)) for repairing the Road leading from Berwick upon Tweed, by Ayton Bridge, to Dunglas Bridge; and the Roads from Billie Causeway and Preston Bridge, to join the said Road at or near Cockburnspath Tower, in the County of Berwick. (Repealed by Berwick-upon-Tweed and Dunglas Bridge Road Act 1832 (2 & 3 Will. 4. c. xxxi))
Roads communicating with the West India and East India Docks Act 1811 (repealed)	51 Geo. 3. c. xlii	6 May 1811
An Act for enlarging the Term and Powers of several Acts of His present Majesty, (Note: Roads from West India Docks Act 1802 (42 Geo. 3. c. ci)) (Note: West India Docks, Cannon Street and East India Docks Roads Act 1804 (44 Geo. 3. c. xxxvii)) (Note: Roads to the West and East India Docks Act 1806 (46 Geo. 3. c. cxxv)) (Note: Roads to the West India Docks Act 1809 (49 Geo. 3. c. clxxii)) for making and maintaining the Roads communicating with the West India and East India Docks, and for repairing the Cannon Street Road, and for making and maintaining a new Road to Barking, and a Road from the Romford and Whitechapel Road to Tilbury Fort, in the Counties of Middlesex and Essex. (Repealed by Commercial and East India and Barking Roads Act 1828 (9 Geo. 4. c. cxii))
Colchester and Wivenhoe Navigation and Colchester Improvement Act 1811 (repealed)	51 Geo. 3. c. xliii	6 May 1811
An Act for improving the Navigation from the Hythe at Colchester to Wivenhoe in the County of Essex; and for better paving, lighting, watching, cleansing and improving the said Town of Colchester (Repealed by Colchester Borough Council Act 2001 (c. ii))
Road from Wem and Whitchurch Road to Sandford and Hodnet Road Act 1811	51 Geo. 3. c. xliv	6 May 1811
An Act for making and maintaining a Road from the Wem and Whitchurch Road, to the Sandford and Hodnet Road, both in the County of Salop.
Stoke Ferry Roads (Norfolk) Act 1811 (repealed)	51 Geo. 3. c. xlv	6 May 1811
An Act to continue and amend Two Acts of His present Majesty (Note: Stoke Ferry Roads Act 1770 (10 Geo. 3. c. 78)) (Note: Norfolk Roads Act 1791 (31 Geo. 3. c. 100)) for repairing several Roads leading from the Bell, in Stoke Ferry, in the County of Norfolk, and the Road from Methwold Warren House to a Place called the Devil's Ditch, in the said County. (Repealed by Stoke Ferry Roads (Norfolk) Act 1832 (2 & 3 Will. 4. c. lxxxiii))
Abingdon and Swinford Road Act 1811 (repealed)	51 Geo. 3. c. xlvi	6 May 1811
An Act for enlarging the Term and Powers of Two Acts of His present Majesty, (Note: Abingdon to Swinford Road Act 1768 (8 Geo. 3. c. 61)) (Note: Abingdon to Swinford Road Act 1790 (30 Geo. 3. c. 106)) for repairing the Road from Abingdon to Swinford, in the County of Berks. (Repealed by Statute Law (Repeals) Act 2013 (c. 2))
Road from Vinehall to Rye Act 1811 (repealed)	51 Geo. 3. c. xlvii	6 May 1811
An Act for enlarging the Term and Powers of Two Acts of His present Majesty, (Note: Sussex Roads Act 1771 (11 Geo. 3. c. 94)) (Note: Sussex Roads Act 1791 (31 Geo. 3. c. 104)) for repairing the Road from Vinehall, in the County of Sussex, to Cripps's Corner, and from thence to Staplecross, and from Cripps's Corner to the Town of Rye, in the said County. (Repealed by Road from Vinehall to Taylor's Corner (Sussex) Act 1832 (2 & 3 Will. 4. c. lvii))
Tiverton Roads Act 1811 (repealed)	51 Geo. 3. c. xlviii	6 May 1811
An Act for repairing and improving the Roads leading to and from Tiverton, in the County of Devon. (Repealed by Tiverton Roads Act 1830 (11 Geo. 4 & 1 Will. 4. c. xcvii))
London Dock Company's Rates (Wines and Spirits) Act 1811 (repealed)	51 Geo. 3. c. xlix	6 May 1811
An Act for regulating the Rates and Charges to be received by the London Dock Company, upon Wines and Spirits landed and warehoused in the London Docks. (Repealed by London Docks Act 1828 (9 Geo. 4. c. cxvi))
Viscount Sackville's Estate Act 1811	51 Geo. 3. c. l	6 May 1811
An Act for vesting certain Estates late of the Right Honourable George Lord Viscount Sackville deceased, situate in the Borough Town and Parish of East Grinstead, in the County of Sussex, in Trustees, upon Trust to sell the same; and to lay out the Monies thence arising in the Purchase of other Estates, to be settled to the same Uses as the Estates so sold.
Rectory of Nailsea with Chapel of Bourton Annexed Act 1811	51 Geo. 3. c. li	6 May 1811
An Act for effectually separating the several Churches or Chapelries of Nailsea and Bourton otherwise Flax Bourton otherwise Boreton, in the County of Somerset, from the Rectory and Parish Church of Wraxhall, in the said County, and for uniting the several Churches or Chapelries of Nailsea and Bourton otherwise Flax Bourton otherwise Boreton aforesaid, into and making the same one distinct and separate Rectory.
Scarning, Hoe, Worthington and Dillington Inclosures Act 1811	51 Geo. 3. c. lii	6 May 1811
An Act for inclosing Lands in Scarning, Hoe, Worthing and Dillington, in the County of Norfolk.
Westward Inclosure Act 1811	51 Geo. 3. c. liii	6 May 1811
An Act for inclosing Lands in the Manor, Lordship or Forest of Westward, in the Parish of Westward, in the County of Cumberland.
Cholmondeston Inclosure Act 1811	51 Geo. 3. c. liv	6 May 1811
An Act for inclosing Lands in the Township of Cholmondeston, in the Parish of Acton, in the County of Chester.
Fulwood Inclosure Act 1811	51 Geo. 3. c. lv	6 May 1811
An Act for inclosing certain Tracts, or Parcels of Common and Waste Grounds, called Fulwood Moor and Cadeley Moor, within and Parcel of the Forest of Fulwood, in the County Palatine of Lancaster.
Long Compton Inclosure Act 1811	51 Geo. 3. c. lvi	6 May 1811
An Act for inclosing Lands in the Parish of Long Compton, in the County of Warwick.
Great Paxton and Toseland Inclosure Act 1811	51 Geo. 3. c. lvii	6 May 1811
An Act for inclosing and exonerating from Tythes, Lands in the Parishes of Great Paxton and Toseland, in the County of Huntingdon.
Wigton, Woodside and Waverton Inclosures Act 1811	51 Geo. 3. c. lviii	6 May 1811
An Act for inclosing Lands in the Townships of Wigton, Woodside and Waverton, within and Parcel of the Barony of Wigton in the County of Cumberland.
St. John the Baptist Peterborough Inclosure Act 1811	51 Geo. 3. c. lix	6 May 1811
An Act for inclosing Lands in the Parish of Saint John the Baptist Peterborough, in the County of Northampton.
Bristol and Taunton Canal Navigation Act 1811	51 Geo. 3. c. lx	14 May 1811
An Act for making a Navigable Canal from the River Avon, at or near Morgan's Pill, in the Parish of Easton in Gordano otherwise Saint George's, in the County of Somerset, to or near the River Tone, in the Parish of Saint James in Taunton, in the said County, and a certain navigable Cut therein described.
Dunfermline Improvement Act 1811	51 Geo. 3. c. lxi	14 May 1811
An Act for paving, lighting, cleansing, widening and otherways improving the Streets of the Burgh of Dunfermline, increasing the Supply of Water, extending the Royalty of the said Burgh; and for other Purposes therein mentioned relative thereto.
Newport (Monmouthshire) Roads Act 1811 (repealed)	51 Geo. 3. c. lxii	14 May 1811
An Act for repealing so much of an Act of the Thirty ninth and Fortieth Year of His present Majesty,{{efn(%[%[39 & 40 Geo. 3]]. c. xv)
Roads from Cramond Bridge to Queensferry and Linlithgow Act 1811 (repealed)	51 Geo. 3. c. lxiii	14 May 1811
An Act for rendering more effectual several Acts (Note: Edinburgh and Leith Road Act 1750 (24 Geo. 2. c. 35)) (Note: Linlithgow Roads Act 1771 (11 Geo. 3. c. 79)) (Note: Queensferry Roads Act 1792 (32 Geo. 3. c. 125)) for repairing the Turnpike Road from Cramond Bridge to the Town of Queensferry in the County of Linlithgow; and for altering and repairing the High Road leading from the West End of the said Town of Queensferry to the Town of Linlithgow. (Repealed by Queensferry Roads, Linlithgow Act 1830 (11 Geo. 4 & 1 Will. 4. c. cix))
St. Mary-le-Strand Workhouse and Improvement Act 1811	51 Geo. 3. c. lxiv	14 May 1811
An Act for providing a Workhouse for the Use of the Parish of Saint Mary le Strand, in the County of Middlesex, and Liberty of Westminster; and for better paving, lighting, cleansing and watching the said Parish; and for other Purposes therein mentioned.
Robeston Wathan and St. Clears Road (Pembrokeshire) Act 1811 (repealed)	51 Geo. 3. c. lxv	14 May 1811
An Act for continuing the Term and amending the Powers of an Act (Note: Pembroke Roads Act 1791 (31 Geo. 3. c. 102)) for repairing the Road leading from Robeston Wathan to Saint Clears, and other Roads therein mentioned, in the Counties of Pembroke and Carmarthen. (Repealed by Robeston Wathan and St. Clears Road and Branches (Pembroke and Carmarthen) Act 1832 (2 & 3 Will. 4. c. liv))
Commercial Docks Act 1811 (repealed)	51 Geo. 3. c. lxvi	14 May 1811
An Act to amend and render more effectual an Act of His present Majesty, (Note: Commercial Docks Act 1810 (50 Geo. 3. c. ccvii)) for maintaining and improving the Docks and Warehouses, called The Commercial Docks, in the Parish of Saint Mary Rotherhithe, in the County of Surrey; and for extending the Power of the said Act. (Repealed by Surrey Commercial Dock Act 1864 (27 & 28 Vict. c. xxxi))
Rutland Gaol and Bridewell Act 1811 (repealed)	51 Geo. 3. c. lxvii	14 May 1811
An Act for vesting in the Justices of the Peace for the County of Rutland the New Gaol and Bridewell for that County, and the Ground purchased for the Scites thereof, and for confirming certain Rates and Proceedings relative thereto. (Repealed by Leicestershire Act 1985 (c. xvii))
Chapels of St. Mary and St. Paul, Birmingham Act 1811	51 Geo. 3. c. lxviii	14 May 1811
An Act to repeal certain Parts of an Act of His present Majesty (Note: Birmingham Chapels Act 1772 (12 Geo. 3. c. 64)) for building Two Chapels, and providing Burial Grounds thereto, in the Town of Birmingham, in the County of Warwick, and for amending the said Act.
Buxton Church Act 1811	51 Geo. 3. c. lxix	14 May 1811
An Act for building and establishing a Church or Chapel of Ease, at Buxton, in the County of Derby.
Garion Bridge (Lanarkshire) Act 1811	51 Geo. 3. c. lxx	14 May 1811
An Act for erecting and maintaining a Bridge over the River Clyde, near Garion and Dalserf, in the County of Lanark.
Fosdyke Bridge Act 1811 (repealed)	51 Geo. 3. c. lxxi	14 May 1811
An Act for repealing so much of an Act of His present Majesty, (Note: Lincoln Drainage, etc. Act 1794 (34 Geo. 3. c. 102)) as relates to making a Public Way over Fosdyke Wash, in the County of Lincoln; and for granting further powers for building a Bridge over the said Wash. (Repealed by Fosdyke Bridge Transfer Act 1870 (33 & 34 Vict. c. xxxiv))
Road from Bromham Bridge to Olney Act 1811 (repealed)	51 Geo. 3. c. lxxii	14 May 1811
An Act for enlarging the Term and Powers of an Act of His present Majesty, for repairing the Road from Bromham Bridge, in the County of Bedford, to Olney, and other Places, in the County of Bucks. (Note: Bedford and Buckinghamshire Roads Act 1790 (30 Geo. 3. c. 114)) (Repealed by Bedford and Newport Pagnell Road to Olney Act 1832 (2 & 3 Will. 4. c. xviii))
Road from Derby to Mansfield Act 1811 (repealed)	51 Geo. 3. c. lxxiii	14 May 1811
An Act for enlarging the Term and Powers of Two Acts of His present Majesty, (Note: Nottinghamshire Roads Act 1764 (4 Geo. 3. c. 61)) (Note: Nottinghamshire Roads Act 1785 (25 Geo. 3. c. 107)) for repairing the Road from Derby to Mansfield, and several other Roads in the County of Nottingham. (Repealed by Derby, Mansfield and Nuttall Roads Act 1830 (11 Geo. 4 & 1 Will. 4. c. xcv))
Haddon and Bentley (Derbyshire) Road Act 1811 (repealed)	51 Geo. 3. c. lxxiv	14 May 1811
An Act for making and maintaining a Road from the Guide Post below Haddon, out of the Bakewell Turnpike Road, by Grange Mill, into the Bentley and Ashbourne Turnpike Road, in the County of Derby. (Repealed by Haddon and Bentley (Derbyshire) Road Act 1833 (3 & 4 Will. 4. c. lxxvi))
Roads from Little Sheffield Sparrow Pit Gate Act 1811 (repealed)	51 Geo. 3. c. lxxv	14 May 1811
An Act for enlarging the Term and Powers of an Act of His present Majesty, (Note: Yorkshire and Derby Roads Act 1795 (35 Geo. 3. c. 164)) for repairing the Roads from Little Sheffield, in the County of York, to Sparrow Pit Gate, and several other Places in the County of Derby; and for amending and making certain other Roads to communicate therewith. (Repealed by Sheffield and Chapel-en-le-Frith Roads Act 1825 (6 Geo. 4. c. cxliv))
Roads from Fosbrook to Chedleton (Staffordshire) Act 1811 (repealed)	51 Geo. 3. c. lxxvi	14 May 1811
An Act to continue and amend an Act of His present Majesty (Note: Stafford Roads Act 1790 (30 Geo. 3. c. 100)) for repairing the Road from Fosbrook, in the Parish of Dillorn, to Chedleton, in the County of Stafford. (Repealed by Roads in the Neighbourhood of Cheadle Act 1831 (1 Will. 4. c. lxviii))
Baldock, Royston and Bourn Bridge Roads Act 1811	51 Geo. 3. c. lxxvii	14 May 1811
An Act for continuing and amending Two Acts of His present Majesty, (Note: Hertford and Cambridge Roads Act 1769 (9 Geo. 3. c. 86)) (Note: Hertford Roads Act 1771 (11 Geo. 3. c. 57)) for repairing the Roads from Baldock to Royslon, and from Royston to Bourn Bridge, in the Counties of Hertford and Cambridge.
Stevenage and Biggleswade Road Act 1811 (repealed)	51 Geo. 3. c. lxxviii	14 May 1811
An Act for continuing and amending several Acts (Note: Stevenage and Biggleswade Road Act 1719 (6 Geo. 1. c. 25)) (Note: Hertfordshire Roads Act 1725 (12 Geo. 1. c. 10)) (Note: Stevenage and Biggleswade Road Act 1755 (28 Geo. 2. c. 30)) (Note: Hertford and Bedford Roads Act 1769 (9 Geo. 3. c. 64)) (Note: Stevenage to Biggleswade Road Act 1778 (18 Geo. 3. c. 82)) for repairing the Roads from Stevenage, in the County of Hertford, to Biggleswade, in the County of Bedford; and other Roads therein described. (Repealed by Stevenage, Biggleswade and Arsley Road Act 1832 (2 & 3 Will. 4. c. lxxvi))
Wimbourne Minster and Blandford Forum Road Act 1811 (repealed)	51 Geo. 3. c. lxxix	14 May 1811
An Act for reviving, continuing and enlarging the Term and Powers of Two Acts of His present Majesty, (Note: Wimbourne Minster and Blandford Forum Road Act 1766 (6 Geo. 3. c. 68)) (Note: Wimbourne Minster and Blandford Forum Road Act 1788 (28 Geo. 3. c. 91)) for repairing the Road from Wimborne Minster to Blandford Forum, in the County of Dorset. (Repealed by Wimborne Minster and Blandford Forum Road Act 1831 (1 Will. 4. c. ix))
Road from Billingshurst to Broadbridge Heath Act 1811 (repealed)	51 Geo. 3. c. lxxx	14 May 1811
An Act for making and maintaining a Turnpike Road from or near a Place called The Five Oaks, in the Parish of Billingshurst, in the County of Sussex, to join the Horsham and Guildford Turnpike Road on Broadbridge Heath, in the said County. (Repealed by Road from Billingshurst to Broadbridge Heath Act 1832 (2 & 3 Will. 4. c. lviii))
Roads from Cranbrook and from Benenden Act 1811 (repealed)	51 Geo. 3. c. lxxxi	14 May 1811
An Act for continuing and amending Two Acts of His present Majesty, (Note: Kent Roads Act 1769 (9 Geo. 3. c. 43)) (Note: Kent Roads Act 1789 (29 Geo. 3. c. 84)) for repairing the Roads from Golford Green, in the Parish of Cranbrooke, to the Turnpike Road in the Parish of Sandhurst, and from the Green near Benenden Church to Rolvenden Cross, in the County of Kent. (Repealed by Cranbrook and Sandhurst, and Benenden and Rolvenden Cross Roads Act 1833 (3 & 4 Will. 4. c. xxviii))
Roads to and from Shawbury (Salop.) Act 1811 (repealed)	51 Geo. 3. c. lxxxii	14 May 1811
An Act to enlarge the Term and Powers of Two Acts of His present Majesty, (Note: Salop Roads Act 1769 (9 Geo. 3. c. 55)) (Note: Salop Roads Act 1790 (30 Geo. 3. c. 111)) for repairing several Roads to and from Shawbury, in the County of Salop. (Repealed by Shawbury District of Roads (Salop.) Act 1832 (2 & 3 Will. 4. c. lxxv))
Brightwell Inclosure Act 1811	51 Geo. 3. c. lxxxiii	14 May 1811
An Act for allotting and inclosing Lands in the Parish of Brightwell, in the County of Berks.
Fyfield Inclosure Act 1811	51 Geo. 3. c. lxxxiv	14 May 1811
An Act for enclosing Lands in the Parish of Fyfield, in the County of Berks.
Garsington Inclosure Act 1811	51 Geo. 3. c. lxxxv	14 May 1811
An Act for inclosing Lands in the Parish of Garsington in the County of Oxford.
Little Ponton Inclosure Act 1811	51 Geo. 3. c. lxxxvi	14 May 1811
An Act for enclosing, and exonerating from Tythes, Lands in the Parish of Little Ponton otherwise Little Paunton, in the County of Lincoln.
Llanfyllin and Mechen Ucheod Inclosures Act 1811	51 Geo. 3. c. lxxxvii	14 May 1811
An Act for inclosing Lands in the Manors of Llanfyllin and Mechen Uchoed, in the County of Montgomery.
Somerby Inclosures Act 1811	51 Geo. 3. c. lxxxviii	14 May 1811
An Act for inclosing, and exonerating from Tythes, Lands in the Parish of Somerby, in the County of Lincoln.
Teirtref Inclosure Act 1811	51 Geo. 3. c. lxxxix	14 May 1811
An Act for inclosing Lands in the Manor of Teirtref, in the County of Montgomery.
Beeley Inclosure Act 1811	51 Geo. 3. c. xc	14 May 1811
An Act for inclosing Lands in the Township of Beeley, in the County of Derby.
Wilden Inclosure Act 1811	51 Geo. 3. c. xci	14 May 1811
An Act for inclosing and exonerating from Tithes, Lands in the Parish of Wilden, in the County of Bedford.
Astley Inclosure Act 1811	51 Geo. 3. c. xcii	14 May 1811
An Act for inclosing Lands in the Parish of Astley, in the County of Worcester.
Westbury-upon-Trym, Henbury and Compton Greenfield Inclosures Act 1811	51 Geo. 3. c. xciii	14 May 1811
An Act for inclosing Lands in the Parishes of Westbury upon Trym, Henbury and Compton Greenfield, in the County of Gloucester.
Leighton and Thornton Inclosures Act 1811	51 Geo. 3. c. xciv	14 May 1811
An Act for inclosing Lands in the Manors and Townships of Leighton and Thornton, in the Parish of Great Nelson, in the County of Chester.
Great and Little Chishill Inclosures Act 1811	51 Geo. 3. c. xcv	14 May 1811
An Act for allotting, and exonerating from Tithes, Lands in the Parishes of Great Chishill and Little Chishill, in the County of Essex.
Pirton Inclosure Act 1811	51 Geo. 3. c. xcvi	14 May 1811
An Act for inclosing, and exonerating from Tithes, Lands in the Parish of Pirton, in the County of Hertford.
Osgodby Inclosure Act 1811	51 Geo. 3. c. xcvii	14 May 1811
An Act for inclosing, and exonerating from Tithes, Lands in the Township of Osgodby, and Parish of Hemingbrough, in the East Riding of the County of York.
Lyons, Kill, Clonoclis, Cellbridge and Donnacomport Inclosures Act 1811	51 Geo. 3. c. xcviii	14 May 1811
An Act for inclosing Lands in the Parishes of Lyons, Kill, Clonoclis, Gelbridge and Donnacomport, in the County of Kildare.
Stewkley Inclosure Act 1811	51 Geo. 3. c. xcix	14 May 1811
An Act for inclosing Lands in the Parish of Stewkley, in the County of Buckingham.
Woolhampton Inclosure Act 1811	51 Geo. 3. c. c	14 May 1811
An Act for inclosing Lands in the Parish of Woolhampton, and other Parishes and Places therein mentioned, in the County of Berks.
Roads in Stirling Act 1811 (repealed)	51 Geo. 3. c. ci	21 May 1811
An Act for more effectually repairing and improving certain Roads in the County of Stirling, and the Road from or near from the West End of the Town of Linlithgow to Stirling, in the Counties of Linlithgow and Stirling. (Repealed by Linlithgow Bridge and Stirling Roads Act 1829 (10 Geo. 4. c. lviii))
Plymouth Improvement Act 1811 (repealed)	51 Geo. 3. c. cii	21 May 1811
An Act for improving the Town of Plymouth, in the County of Devon. (Repealed by Plymouth City Council Act 1987 (c. iv))
Thornton's Paintings, Drawings, Engravings and Books Act 1811	51 Geo. 3. c. ciii	21 May 1811
An Act to enable Doctor Robert John Thornton to dispose of his Collection of Paintings, Drawings and Engravings, together with several Copies of certain Books therein mentioned, by way of Chance.
Limerick Improvement Act 1811 (repealed)	51 Geo. 3. c. civ	21 May 1811
An Act for altering and enlarging the Powers of an Act of His present Majesty, (Note: Limerick Improvement Act 1807 (47 Geo. 3 Sess. 2. c. lxxv)) for paving, cleansing, lighting and watching the Parish of Saint Michael, in the Liberties of the City of Limerick, and adjoining the said City, and for preventing and removing Nuisances therein. (Repealed by Limerick Improvement Act 1853 (16 & 17 Vict. c. cxciv))
Birmingham Canal Navigations Act 1811 (repealed)	51 Geo. 3. c. cv	21 May 1811
An Act for enlarging the Powers of several Acts of His present Majesty, (Note: Birmingham Canal Navigation Act 1768 (8 Geo. 3. c. 38)) (Note: Birmingham Canal Navigation Act 1769 (9 Geo. 3. c. 53)) (Note: Birmingham and Fazeley Canal Act 1783 (23 Geo. 3. c. 92)) for making and maintaining the Birmingham Canal Navigations, and for further extending and improving the same. (Repealed by Birmingham Canal Navigations Act 1835 (5 & 6 Will. 4. c. xxxiv))
Penclawdd Canal and Railway or Tramroad Act 1811	51 Geo. 3. c. cvi	21 May 1811
An Act for making and maintaining a navigable Canal and a Railway or Tram Road from the River Burry, at or near the Village of Penclawdd, in the Parish of Lanridian, into the Township or Borough of Loughor; and divers Branches therefrom, all in the County of Glamorgan.
Clapham Parochial and Poor Rates, Workhouse and Land Tax Act 1811 (repealed)	51 Geo. 3. c. cvii	21 May 1811
An Act for better assessing and collecting the Poor and other Parochial Rates of the Parish of Clapham, in the County of Surrey; and to alter, enlarge, rebuild or repair the present Workhouse, and to regulate the Poor thereof, and for other Purposes relating thereto; and to amend so much of an Act of the Fourteenth Year of His present Majesty, (Note: Clapham Church Act 1774 (14 Geo. 3. c. 12)) for rebuilding a Parish Church, as relates to the assessing the Church Rates by the Land Tax. (Repealed by London Government (Borough of Wandsworth) Order in Council 1901 (SR&O 1901/222))
Suffolk Roads Act 1811 (repealed)	51 Geo. 3. c. cviii	21 May 1811
An Act for enlarging the Term and Powers of an Act of His present Majesty, (Note: Ipswich and Yaxley Roads Act 1793 (33 Geo. 3. c. 128)) for repairing the Roads from Ipswich to the Scole Inn Road, and from Claydon to the Bury St Edmund's Road, and from Yaxley Bull to Eye and Lanthorn Green, in the County of Suffolk. (Repealed by Statute Law (Repeals) Act 2008 (c. 12))
Road from Kingston-upon-Thames to Leatherhead Act 1811 (repealed)	51 Geo. 3. c. cix	21 May 1811
An Act for making and maintaining a Road from Kingston upon Thames to Leatherhead, in the County of Surrey. (Repealed by Road from Kingston-upon-Thames to Leatherhead Act 1825 (6 Geo. 4. c. xlvi))
Roads to and through Goudhurst Act 1811 (repealed)	51 Geo. 3. c. cx	21 May 1811
An Act for enlarging the Term and Powers of Two Acts of His present Majesty, for repairing the Roads leading to and through the Town of Goudhurst, in the County of Kent. (Repealed by Roads to and through Goudhurst Act 1832 (2 & 3 Will. 4. c. lxxiv))
Long Preston and Sawley Road Act 1811	51 Geo. 3. c. cxi	21 May 1811
An Act for making and maintaining a Road from Long Preston to Sawley, in the West Riding of the County of York.
Brimington and Chesterfield Roads Act 1811 (repealed)	51 Geo. 3. c. cxii	21 May 1811
An Act for enlarging the Term and Powers of Two Acts, of His present Majesty, for repairing the Roads from Brimmington and Chesterfield, to several Places, all in the County of Derby. (Note: Brimington and Chesterfield Roads Act 1766 (6 Geo. 3. c. 80)) (Note: Brimington and Chesterfield Roads Act 1786 (26 Geo. 3. c. 149)) (Repealed by Brimington, Chesterfield and High Moors Roads (Derbyshire) Act 1833 (3 & 4 Will. 4. c. lxxxviii))
Little Yarmouth and Blythburgh and Brampton and Halesworth Roads Act 1811 (repealed)	51 Geo. 3. c. cxiii	21 May 1811
An Act for enlarging the Term and Powers of an Act of His present Majesty, (Note: Little Yarmouth and Blytheburgh Road Act 1796 (36 Geo. 3. c. 142)) for repairing the Road from Little Yarmouth to Blythburgh, and from Brampton to Halesworth, in the County of Suffolk. (Repealed by Little Yarmouth and Blythburgh, and Brampton and Halesworth Roads Act 1832 (2 & 3 Will. 4. c. liii))
Great Hadham Rectory and Gordon's Estate Act 1811	51 Geo. 3. c. cxiv	21 May 1811
An Act for effectuating an Agreement between the Reverend Anthony Hamilton Doctor of Divinity, Rector of the Rectory and Parish Church of Great Hadham, in the County of Hertford, and James Gordon Esquire; and for accelerating the Sale to the said James Gordon of certain Lands heretofore enjoyed, as Parcel of the said Rectory, for the Purpose of redeeming the Land Tax of such Rectory.
Seaton Ross Inclosure Act 1811	51 Geo. 3. c. cxv	21 May 1811
An Act for inclosing Lands in the Township and Parish of Seaton Ross, in the East Riding of the County of York.
King James' Hospital, Gateshead Act 1811	51 Geo. 3. c. cxvi	21 May 1811
An Act to enable the Master and Brethren of the Hospital of King James, in Gateshead, in the County of Durham, to grant Leases of Lands thereto belonging, and to enable the Lord Bishop of Durham to make Statutes and Ordinances for the Government of the said Hospital.
Newmarket (Flintshire) and Cŵm Inclosures Act 1811	51 Geo. 3. c. cxvii	21 May 1811
An Act for inclosing Lands in the Parishes of Newmarket and Cŵm, in the County of Flint.
Llanarmon, Llandegla and Bryneglwys Inclosures Act 1811	51 Geo. 3. c. cxviii	21 May 1811
An Act for inclosing Lands in the Parishes of Llanarmon, Llandegla and Bryneglwys, in the Counties of Denbigh and Flint.
Fundenhall and Ashwellthorpe Inclosures Act 1811	51 Geo. 3. c. cxix	21 May 1811
An Act for inclosing Lands in the Parishes of Fundenhall and Ashwellthorpe, in the County of Norfolk.
Stoke Talmage Inclosure Act 1811	51 Geo. 3. c. cxx	21 May 1811
Au Act for inclosing Lands in the Parish of Stoke Talmage, in the County of Oxford.
Warton-with-Lindeth and Silverdale Inclosures Act 1811	51 Geo. 3. c. cxxi	21 May 1811
An Act for inclosing and embanking Lands within the Townships of Warton with Lindeth and Silverdale, in the Parish of Warton, in the County Palatine of Lancaster.
Hay Railway Act 1811	51 Geo. 3. c. cxxii	25 May 1811
An Act for making and maintaining a Railway from or near the Public Wharf of the Brecknock and Abergavenny Canal, in the Parish of Saint John the Evangelist, in the County of Brecon, to or near to a certain Place called Parton Cross, in the Parish of Eardisley, in the County of Hereford.
Llanvihangel Railway Act 1811	51 Geo. 3. c. cxxiii	25 May 1811
An Act for making a Railway from the Brecknock and Abergavenny Canal, in the Parish of Llanwenarth, to or near to Llanvihangel Crucorney, in the County of Monmouth.
Braunton Inclosure and Drainage Act 1811	51 Geo. 3. c. cxxiv	25 May 1811
An Act for inclosing draining and embanking Lands in Braunton, in the County of Devon.
Bromley St. Leonard Poor Rates Act 1811 (repealed)	51 Geo. 3. c. cxxv	25 May 1811
An Act for more equally assessing and collecting the Poor Rates, in the Parish of Bromley Saint Leonard, in the County of Middlesex. (Repealed by London Government (Borough of Poplar) Order in Council 1901 (SR&O 1901/220))
Hungerford Parish Church Act 1811	51 Geo. 3. c. cxxvi	25 May 1811
An Act for repairing, enlarging and improving the Parish Church of Hungerford, in the Counties of Berks and Wilts.
Haddington Roads Act 1811 (repealed)	51 Geo. 3. c. cxxvii	25 May 1811
An Act for more effectually making and repairing certain Roads in the County of Haddington; and for rendering more effectual the Statute Labour of the said County. (Repealed by Haddingtonshire Roads Act 1833 (3 & 4 Will. 4. c. cix))
Pudsey Inclosure Act 1811	51 Geo. 3. c. cxxviii	25 May 1811
An Act for inclosing Lands in the Manor of Pudsey, in the Parish of Calverley, in the West Riding of the County of York.
Caistor, North and South Kelsey, Clixby, Grasby and Searby-cum-Owmby Inclosures Act 1811	51 Geo. 3. c. cxxix	25 May 1811
An Act for inclosing Lands in or belonging to the Parishes of Caistor, North Kelsey, South Kelsey, Clixby, Grasby and Searby cum Owmby, in the County of Lincoln.
Biddestone St. Nicholas, Biddestone St. Peters and Slaughterford Inclosures Act 1811	51 Geo. 3. c. cxxx	25 May 1811
An Act for dividing, allotting- and inclosing Lands, in the several Parishes of Biddestone Saint Nicholas, Biddestone Saint Peters and Slaughterford, in the County of Wilts.
Quernmore Moor Inclosure Act 1811	51 Geo. 3. c. cxxxi	25 May 1811
An Act for inclosing Quernmore Moor within and Parcel of the Forest of Quernmore, in the Parish of Lancaster, in the County Palatine of Lancaster.
Malldraeth and Corsddaugau Inclosing, Embanking and Draining Act 1811	51 Geo. 3. c. cxxxii	31 May 1811
An Act for enlarging the Powers of Two Acts of His present Majesty, (Note: Anglesea Drainage, etc. Act 1788 (28 Geo. 3. c. 71)) (Note: Anglesey Drainage Act 1790 (30 Geo. 3. c. 59)) for inclosing and embanking the Marsh called Malldraeth and Corfddaugau, in the County of Anglesey; and for draining and preserving the inclosed Lowlands contiguous thereto.
Berwick and Kelso Railway and Bridge over Tweed Act 1811	51 Geo. 3. c. cxxxiii	31 May 1811
An Act for making and maintaining a Railway from or near Spittal, in the County of Durham, to Kelso, in the County of Roxburgh; and for erecting and maintaining a Bridge over the River Tweed from the Parish of Norham, in the County of Durham, to the Parish of Coldstream, in the County of Berwick.
St. Mary Islington Chapel of Ease and Burial Ground Act 1811 (repealed)	51 Geo. 3. c. cxxxiv	31 May 1811
An Act for providing a Chapel of Ease and an additional Burial Ground for the Parish of Saint Mary Islington, in the County of Middlesex. (Repealed by St. Mary Islington Improvement Act 1824 (5 Geo. 4. c. cxxv))
Marquis of Downshire's Estate Act 1811	51 Geo. 3. c. cxxxv	31 May 1811
An Act for authorizing the Payment into the Bank of England, under the Direction of His Majesty's High Court of Chancery, in the Name of the Accountant General of the said Court, of the Portions provided for the younger Children of the Most Honourable Arthur late Marquis of Downshire, by the Most Honourable Mary now Marchioness Dowager of Downshire and Baroness Sandys, by the Settlement made after, in pursuance of Articles executed before their Marriage, and for exonerating the Estates comprised in the said Articles and Settlement from the same.
See of Canterbury's Estates (Deal and Cliffe) Act 1811	51 Geo. 3. c. cxxxvi	31 May 1811
An Act for enabling the Archbishop of Canterbury to grant Building and Repairing Leases of Estates at Deal and Cliffe, in the County of Kent, belonging to the See of Canterbury; and for other Purposes.
Elmswell, Great Ashfield, Hunston and Norton Inclosures Act 1811	51 Geo. 3. c. cxxxvii	31 May 1811
An Act for inclosing Lands in the Parishes of Elmswell, Great Ashfield, Hunston and Norton, in the County of Suffolk.
Hampton Inclosure Act 1811	51 Geo. 3. c. cxxxviii	31 May 1811
An Act for inclosing Lands in the Parish of Hampton, in the County of Middlesex.
Wells-next-the-Sea, Warham All Saints, Warham St. Mary Magdalen and Warham St. Mary the Virgin Inclosures Act 1811	51 Geo. 3. c. cxxxix	31 May 1811
An Act for allotting Lands in the Parishes of Wells next the Sea, Warham All Saints, Warham Saint Mary Magdalen and Warham Saint Mary the Virgin, in the County of Norfolk.
Killington Inclosure Act 1811	51 Geo. 3. c. cxl	31 May 1811
An Act for inclosing Lands in the Township of Killington, in the Parish of Kirkby Lonsdale, in the County of Westmorland.
Tilehurst Inclosure Act 1811	51 Geo. 3. c. cxli	31 May 1811
An Act for inclosing Lands in the Parish of Tilehurst, in the County of Berks.
Beenham and Padworth Inclosures Act 1811	51 Geo. 3. c. cxlii	31 May 1811
An Act for inclosing several Open and Common Fields, Meadows, Pastures; and other Commonable and Waste Lands in the several Parishes of Beenham and Padworth, in Berks.
Liverpool Port and Town Improvement Act 1811 (repealed)	51 Geo. 3. c. cxliii	10 June 1811
An Act for the Improvement of the Port and Town of Liverpool, and amending the several Acts relating to the Docks, Quays and other Works belonging to the said Port. (Repealed by Mersey Dock Acts Consolidation Act 1858 (21 & 22 Vict. c. xcii))
St. Nicholas Bay Harbour and Canterbury Canal Act 1811	51 Geo. 3. c. cxliv	10 June 1811
An Act for making a Harbour and Wet Dock, at or near Saint Nicholas Bay, in the Parish of Saint Nicholas and All Saints, in the Isle of Thanet, in the County of Kent; and for making a Navigable Canal from the said Harbour to the City of Canterbury.
Kent Waterworks Acts Amendment Act 1811	51 Geo. 3. c. cxlv	10 June 1811
An Act to enable the Company of Proprietors of the Kent Water Works to raise a further Sum of Money, and to alter and enlarge the Powers of an Act of His present Majesty, (Note: Kent Waterworks Act 1809 (49 Geo. 3. c. clxxxix)) for making the said Water Works, and to extend the fame.
Dumfries Improvement and Police Act 1811	51 Geo. 3. c. cxlvi	10 June 1811
An Act for paving, cleansing, lighting and watching the Streets, and otherwise regulating the Police of the Town of Dumfries.
Dumfries Harbour and River Nith Navigation Act 1811	51 Geo. 3. c. cxlvii	10 June 1811
An Act for improving the Harbour of Dumfries, and the Navigation of the River Nith.
Gloucester and Worcester Horse Towing-Path Act 1811	51 Geo. 3. c. cxlviii	10 June 1811
An Act for extending the Horse Towing Path on the Banks of the River Severn from Worcester Bridge to a certain Place below the City of Gloucester, called the Lower Parting, situate at the Corner of Portham Mead, in the County of Gloucester.
Llanasa Inclosure and Drainage Act 1811	51 Geo. 3. c. cxlix	10 June 1811
An Act for inclosing and draining Lands in the Parish of Llanasa, in the County of Flint.
St. Paul's Covent Garden Clergy Stipends Act 1811	51 Geo. 3. c. cl	10 June 1811
An Act for amending an Act of King Charles the Second, (Note: Precinct of Covent Garden Act 1660 (12 Cha. 2. c. 35 Pr.)) for making the Precinct of Covent Garden Parochial; and for increasing the Stipends of the Rector, Curate, Clerk and Sextons of the said Parish.
St. Marylebone Parish Church and Chapels Act 1811 (repealed)	51 Geo. 3. c. cli	10 June 1811
An Act to enable the Vestrymen of the Parish of Saint Mary le Bone, in the County of Middlesex, to build a new Parish Church, and Two or more Chapels; and for other Purposes relating thereto. (Repealed by London Government (Borough of St. Marylebone) Order in Council 1901 (SR&O 1901/272))
Sevenoaks Parish Church Repair Act 1811	51 Geo. 3. c. clii	10 June 1811
An Act for repairing the Parish Church of Sevenoaks, in the County of Kent.
St. Botolph without Aldgate Poor Rates Act 1811 (repealed)	51 Geo. 3. c. cliii	10 June 1811
An Act for amending an Act of His present Majesty, (Note: St. Botolph without Aldgate Poor Rates Act 1810 (50 Geo. 3. c. ccix)) for more equally and effectually assessing and collecting the Poor Rates, within the Parish of Saint Botolph without Aldgate, in the County of Middlesex. (Repealed by London Government (Borough of Stepney) Order in Council 1901 (SR&O 1901/276))
Barnstaple Improvement and Markets Act 1811	51 Geo. 3. c. cliv	10 June 1811
An Act for paving, improving and regulating the Streets and Public Places in the Borough and Parish of Barnstable; and for the better Regulation of the present Markets, and providing others therein.
St. Pancras Improvement Act 1811 (repealed)	51 Geo. 3. c. clv	10 June 1811
An Act for paving and improving the Streets and other Public Passages and Places which are or shall be made upon a Piece of Ground belonging to the Brewers' Company, in the Parish of Saint Pancras, in the County of Middlesex. (Repealed by London Government (Borough of St. Pancras) Order in Council 1901 (SR&O 1901/274))
Road from Kentish Town to Upper Holloway Act 1811 (repealed)	51 Geo. 3. c. clvi	10 June 1811
An Act for making a Public Carriage Road from Kentish Town to Upper Holloway, in the County of Middlesex. (Repealed by Kentish Town and Upper Holloway Road Act 1833 (3 & 4 Will. 4. c. c))
Ightham and London to Maidstone Road Act 1811 (repealed)	51 Geo. 3. c. clvii	10 June 1811
An Act for making and maintaining a Road from Ightham, in the County of Kent, to the Turnpike Road leading from London to Maidstone, in the said County. (Repealed by Ightham and London to Maidstone Road Act 1832 (2 & 3 Will. 4. c. lxii))
St. Michael and South Mimms Road Act 1811 (repealed)	51 Geo. 3. c. clviii	10 June 1811
An Act for repairing the Road through the Parishes of Saint Michael, Saint Alban, Saint Peter, Shenley Ridge and South Mims, in the Counties of Hertford and Middlesex. (Repealed by Pondyards and Chipping Barnet Road Act 1831 (1 & 2 Will. 4. c. lxxiv))
Bodmin and Lanhydrock Roads Act 1811 (repealed)	51 Geo. 3. c. clix	10 June 1811
An Act to continue and amend Two Acts of His present Majesty (Note: Bodmin Roads Act 1769 (9 Geo. 3. c. 69)) (Note: Bodmin Roads Act 1786 (26 Geo. 3. c. 129)) for repairing several Roads leading to and through the Borough of Bodmin, in the County of Cornwall; and for amending certain other Roads passing through the said Borough and the Parish of Lanhydrock, in the said County. (Repealed by Bodmin Roads Act 1829 (10 Geo. 4. c. xix))
Kirtlington Inclosure Act 1811	51 Geo. 3. c. clx	10 June 1811
An Act for inclosing Lands in the Manor and Parish of Kirtlington, in the County of Oxford.
New Radnor Inclosure Act 1811	51 Geo. 3. c. clxi	10 June 1811
An Act for inclosing Lands in the Parish of New Radnor, in the County of Radnor.
Dolgelley and Llangelynin or Celynin Inclosures Act 1811	51 Geo. 3. c. clxii	10 June 1811
An Act for inclosing Lands in the Parishes of Dolgelley and Llangelynin, commonly called Celynin, in the County of Merioneth.
Langsett Inclosure Act 1811	51 Geo. 3. c. clxiii	10 June 1811
An Act for inclosing Lands in the Township of Langset otherwise Langside, in the Parish of Peniston, in the West Riding of the County of York.
Burham Inclosure Act 1811	51 Geo. 3. c. clxiv	10 June 1811
An Act for inclosing Lands in the Parish of Burham, in the County of Kent.
Llanarthney, Llanon, Llandebye and Llanfihangel Aberbythick Inclosures Act 1811	51 Geo. 3. c. clxv	10 June 1811
An Act for inclosing Lands in the Parishes of Llanarthney, Llanon, Llandebye and Llanfihangel Aberbythick, in the County of Carmarthen.
Southwark Bridge Act 1811	51 Geo. 3. c. clxvi	15 June 1811
An Act for erecting a Bridge over the River Thames from or near the Three Cranes in the Parishes of Saint James Garlick Hythe and Saint Martin Vintry, in the City of London, to the opposite Bank of the said River, in the Parish of Saint Saviour, in the County of Surrey; and for making proper Streets and Avenues to communicate therewith.
Bath and Bristol Canal and Bristol Waterworks Act 1811	51 Geo. 3. c. clxvii	15 June 1811
An Act for making a navigable Canal between the Cities of Bath and Bristol, and also for supplying with Water the Inhabitants of the city of Bristol and its Neighbourhood.
Grand Western Canal Act 1811	51 Geo. 3. c. clxviii	15 June 1811
An Act to vary and alter the Line of a Cut authorized to be made by an Act of the Thirty sixth Year of His present Majesty, (Note: Grand Western Canal Act 1796 (36 Geo. 3. c. 46)) for making a Canal from the River Exe near Topsham, in the County of Devon, to the River Tone near Taunton, in the County of Somerset; and to amend the said Act.
Grand Junction Canal Company and Paddington Water Supply Act 1811	51 Geo. 3. c. clxix	15 June 1811
An Act for confirming certain Articles of Agreement entered into between the Company of Proprietors of the Grand Junction Canal and certain Persons, for supplying with Water the Inhabitants of the Parish of Paddington, and the Parishes and Streets adjacent, in the County of Middlesex.
Grand Surrey Canal and Rotherhithe Branch Act 1811 (repealed)	51 Geo. 3. c. clxx	15 June 1811
An Act to enable the Company of Proprietors of the Grand Surrey Canal to make a Collateral Cut, communicating therewith, in the Parish of Saint Mary Rotherhithe, in the County of Surrey, and to enable the said Company to complete the said Canal; and for amending the several Acts relating thereto. (Repealed by Surrey Commercial Dock Act 1864 (27 & 28 Vict. c. xxxi))
East Country Dock (Rotherhithe) Act 1811 (repealed)	51 Geo. 3. c. clxxi	15 June 1811
An Act for completing and maintaining The East Country Dock at Rotherhithe, in the County of Surrey. (Repealed by Surrey Commercial Dock Act 1864 (27 & 28 Vict. c. xxxi))
Gosport Market Act 1811	51 Geo. 3. c. clxxii	15 June 1811
An Act for erecting a new Market Place in the Town or Borough and Manor of Gosport, in the County of Southampton.
Glastonbury Improvement Act 1811 (repealed)	51 Geo. 3. c. clxxiii	15 June 1811
An Act for paving and improving the Streets and other publick Passages and Places in the Parishes of Saint John the Baptist and Saint Benedict, in the Town of Glastonbury, in the County of Somerset. (Repealed by Local Government Board's Provisional Orders Confirmation Act 1872 (35 & 36 Vict. c. xcii))
Road from Doncaster to Bawtry Act 1811 (repealed)	51 Geo. 3. c. clxxiv	15 June 1811
An Act for enlarging the Term and Powers of Two Acts of His present Majesty, (Note: Doncaster to Bawtry Roads Act 1776 (16 Geo. 3. c. 71)) (Note: Road from Doncaster to the Bawtry and Retford Turnpike Road Act 1798 (38 Geo. 3. c. lii)) for repairing the Road from Doncaster to Bawtry, in the County of York. (Repealed by Road from Doncaster to Bawtry Act 1832 (2 & 3 Will. 4. c. xx))
Road from Southwark to the Kent Road Act 1811 (repealed)	51 Geo. 3. c. clxxv	15 June 1811
An Act to amend and render more effectual an Act of His present Majesty, (Note: Road from Southwark to the Kent Road Act 1809 (49 Geo. 3. c. clxxxvi)) for making and maintaining a Road from the Borough of Southwark to the Kent Road, in the County of Surrey. (Repealed by Road from Southwark to the Kent Road Act 1829 (10 Geo. 4. c. cxiii))
Coe Fen Inclosure Act 1811	51 Geo. 3. c. clxxvi	15 June 1811
An Act for inclosing certain Lands called Coe otherwise Cow Fen Leys, in the Parish of Saint Mary the Less, in the Town of Cambridge, in the County of Cambridge.
Tilshead Inclosure Act 1811	51 Geo. 3. c. clxxvii	15 June 1811
An Act for inclosing Lands in the Parish of Tilshead, in the County of Wilts.
Hamilton's Estate Act 1811	51 Geo. 3. c. clxxviii	15 June 1811
An Act for vesting certain Estates late of George Hamilton of Tyrella, in the County of Down, in Ireland, Esquire, deceased, in Trustees, to be sold for Payment of Debts and Legacies, and for laying out the Surplus of the Monies arising from such Sale in the Purchase of other Estates in Ireland, to be settled to the same Uses as the Estates so sold.
Earl Beaulieu's Estate Act 1811	51 Geo. 3. c. clxxix	15 June 1811
An Act for making, under the Direction of His Majesty's High Court of Chancery in Ireland, a Partition of Part of the Irish Estates of the Right Honourable Edward late Earl Beaulieu, in conformity to an Award therein mentioned.
Savile's Estate Act 1811	51 Geo. 3. c. clxxx	15 June 1811
An Act for vesting certain Estates in the County of Tyrone, in Ireland, devised by the Will of Sir George Savile, Baronet, deceased, in Trustees to be sold, and for laying out the Purchase Money under the Direction of the High Court of Chancery, in other Estates to be settled in lieu thereof and to the same Uses.
Dublin Cathedral Leases Act 1811	51 Geo. 3. c. clxxxi	15 June 1811
An Act to enable the Dean of the Cathedral Church of the Holy and Undivided Trinity, Dublin, to accept Surrenders and grant Leases of certain Lands called The Dean's Grange, in the County of Dublin, and to remove Doubts respecting the Validity of Leases heretofore made thereof.
Dean of Windsor and Wolverhampton's Estate Act 1811	51 Geo. 3. c. clxxxii	15 June 1811
An Act for enabling the Dean of Windsor and Wolverhampton, and his Successors, to grant Leases and Licences for opening and working Mines within the Lands belonging to the Manor of Wolverhampton; and for augmenting the Income of the Sacrist of the Collegiate Church or Royal Free Chapel of Wolverhampton.
Daubuz's Estate Act 1811	51 Geo. 3. c. clxxxiii	15 June 1811
An Act for vesting in John Theophilus Daubuz Esquire, an undivided Moiety of certain Premises situate at Low Layton, in the County of Essex; and for applying the Purchase Money in the Purchase of other Estates, to be settled to the subsisting Uses of the Will of Edward Martin, deceased.
Decreed Lands (Lincolnshire and Nottinghamshire) Act 1811	51 Geo. 3. c. clxxxiv	15 June 1811
An Act for empowering the Trustees of certain Lands, Tenements and Hereditaments in the Counties of Lincoln and Nottingham, called The Decreed Lands, to make Sale of a sufficient Part thereof for paying off Incumbrances.
Vipont's Estate Act 1811	51 Geo. 3. c. clxxxv	15 June 1811
An Act for vesting Part of the devised Estates of Henry Vipont deceased, in Trustees, to be sold, and for laying out the whole Purchase Money, under the Direction of the High Court of Chancery, in the Purchase of other Estates, to be settled in lieu thereof and to the same Uses.
Legh's Estate Act 1811	51 Geo. 3. c. clxxxvi	15 June 1811
An Act to enable the Trustees of the Will of Thomas Peter Legh Esquire, deceased, to purchase Estates for the Benefit of their Trust; and to sell certain of the Estates devised by the Will of the said Thomas Peter Legh, for raising Money to pay for such purchased Estates, and for re-imbursing a Sum expended in the Redemption of the Land Tax, charged on other Estates of the said Thomas Peter Legh.
Hornchurch, Romford and Havering Inclosures Act 1811	51 Geo. 3. c. clxxxvii	15 June 1811
An Act for inclosing and dividing the Commons and Waste Lands in the Parishes of Hornchurch, Romford, and Havering, within the Manor and Liberty of Havering atte Bower, in the County of Essex.
Norbury Inclosure Act 1811	51 Geo. 3. c. clxxxviii	15 June 1811
An Act for inclosing Lands in the Manor and Township of Norbury, in the Parish of Stockport, in the County of Chester.
Kingston Inclosure Act 1811	51 Geo. 3. c. clxxxix	15 June 1811
An Act for inclosing Lands in the Parish of Kingston, in the County of Hereford.
Bromham Inclosure Act 1811	51 Geo. 3. c. cxc	15 June 1811
An Act for inclosing Lands in the Parish of Bromham, in the County of Wilts.
Minty Inclosure Act 1811	51 Geo. 3. c. cxci	15 June 1811
An Act for inclosing Lands in the Parish of Minty, in the County of Gloucester.
Great and Little Wymondley and Ippollitts Inclosures Act 1811	51 Geo. 3. c. cxcii	15 June 1811
An Act for inclosing and exonerating from Tythes, Lands in the Parishes of Great Wymondley, Little Wymondley and Ippollitts, in the County of Hertford.
Severn and Wye Railway and Canal Company Act 1811	51 Geo. 3. c. cxciii	26 June 1811
An Act to enable the Severn and Wye Railway and Canal Company to raise a further Sum of Money for the Completion of their Works, and for levying a Tonnage Rale on certain Vessels and Goods now exempted, and further to extend the Powers granted to the said Company.
Simonburn Parishes and Rectors Act 1811	51 Geo. 3. c. cxciv	26 June 1811
An Act for erecting Five distinct Rectories and Parishes within the Rectory and Parish of Simonburn, in the County of Northumberland; and for separating the same from the Rectory and Parish Church of Simonburn; and for providing Parish Churches, Church Yards and Parsonage Houses for the same; and for restraining the Commissioners and Governors of the Royal Hospital for Seamen at Greenwich, in the County of Kent, from presenting to the Rectory of Simonburn, or the said new Rectories, any other Persons than Chaplains in the Royal Navy.
Porthleven Harbour Act 1811	51 Geo. 3. c. cxcv	26 June 1811
An Act for constructing a Harbour at Porthleven in Mounts Bay, in the County of Cornwall.
Sutton Pool Harbour (Plymouth) Act 1811 (repealed)	51 Geo. 3. c. cxcvi	26 June 1811
An Act for the Improvement of the Harbour of Sutton Pool in the Port of Plymouth, in the County of Devon. (Repealed by Sutton Harbour Act 1847 (10 & 11 Vict. c. ccxcvii))
Statute Labour, Roads, Bridges and Ferries in Perthshire Act 1811	51 Geo. 3. c. cxcvii	26 June 1811
An Act for regulating and converting the Statute Services in the County of Perth, and for more effectually making and regulating the Highways, Bridges and Ferries within the said County.
Roads and Bridges in Perthshire Act 1811	51 Geo. 3. c. cxcviii	26 June 1811
An Act for more effectually repairing and maintaining certain Roads and Bridges in the County of Perth.
Woolwich Ferry Act 1811	51 Geo. 3. c. cxcix	26 June 1811
An Act for establishing a Ferry across the River Thames at Woolwich, in the County of Kent.
Newry Parish Church Act 1811	51 Geo. 3. c. cc	26 June 1811
An Act for building a Church in and for the Parish of Newry, in the Counties of Down and Armagh.
Durham Gaol, House of Correction and Court Houses Act 1811 (repealed)	51 Geo. 3. c. cci	26 June 1811
An Act to amend an Act of the Forty ninth Year of His present Majesty, (Note: Durham County Gaol, House of Correction and Courts of Justice Act 1809 (49 Geo. 3. c. cxxxix)) for erecting a new Gaol and House of Correction and new Court Houses, in the County Palatine of Durham, and making an equal County Rate for those Purposes. (Repealed by Durham City Council Act 1985 (c. xxix))
Itchin Coal Rates Act 1811	51 Geo. 3. c. ccii	26 June 1811
An Act for increasing the Rates on Coals conveyed on the River Itchin, in the County of Southampton; and for amending and rendering more effectual the several Acts relating thereto.
Temple Bar Improvement Act 1811 (repealed)	51 Geo. 3. c. cciii	26 June 1811
An Act for raising an additional Sum of Money for carrying into Execution the several Acts for widening the Entrance into the City of London, near Temple Bar, for making a more commodious Street at Snow Hill, and for raising Money on the Credit of the Orphans Fund for those Purposes, and for extending the Powers of the said Acts. (Repealed by Statute Law (Repeals) Act 2013 (c. 2))
Bawtry and Selby Road Act 1811 (repealed)	51 Geo. 3. c. cciv	26 June 1811
An Act for enlarging the Term and Powers of an Act of His present Majesty, for repairing the Road from Bawtry to Selby, in the West Riding of the County of York. (Repealed by Bawtry and Selby Road Act 1832 (2 & 3 Will. 4. c. lxxiii))
Road from the Eynesford Turnpike Road to Farnborough Act 1811 or the Eynesford Road Act 1811 (repealed)	51 Geo. 3. c. ccv	26 June 1811
An Act for repealing an Act of His present Majesty, (Note: Shoreham (Kent) Road Act 1810 (50 Geo. 3. c. xviii)) for repairing and maintaining the Road from the Eynesford Turnpike Road in the Parish of Shoreham in the County of Kent, to the Turnpike Road in the Parish of Farnborough, leading from Seven Oaks to Bromley, in the said County. (Repealed by Statute Law (Repeals) Act 1989 (c. 43))
East Malling Heath and Mereworth and Hadlow Road Act 1811 (repealed)	51 Geo. 3. c. ccvi	26 June 1811
An Act for enlarging the Term and Powers of Two Acts of His present Majesty (Note: Kent Roads Act 1766 (7 Geo. 3. c. 91)) (Note: Kent Roads (No. 2) Act 1789 (29 Geo. 3. c. 100)) for repairing the Road from the Brick Kilns on East Malling Heath to Pembury Green, and from Brand Bridges to the Four Wents, in the County of Kent; and for making a Road therefrom into the Mereworth and Hadlow Road, in the same County. (Repealed by East Malling Heath and Mereworth and Hadlow Road Act 1829 (10 Geo. 4. c. lvi))
Isle of Man Clergy and others Agreement Confirmation Act 1811	51 Geo. 3. c. ccvii	26 June 1811
An Act to confirm certain Articles of Agreement between the Most Noble John Duke of Atholl, the Right Honourable Edward Earl of Derby, the Right Reverend Claudius Lord Bishop of Sodor and Man, the Honourable Edward Stanley commonly called Lord Stanley, the Reverend Daniel Mylrea, William Scott, John Cofnahan, and the Clergy of the Isle of Man; and for other Purposes.
Harthill Church Glebe Lands Rights of Common Act 1811	51 Geo. 3. c. ccviii	26 June 1811
An Act for extinguishing all Rights of Common and other Rights, in respect of the Glebe Land belonging to the Church of Harthill in the County of Chester, in, upon or under the uninclosed Waste Lands in the Township of Harthill in the same County, and such other Lands in the same Township as have been heretofore inclosed and taken from the Waste Lands in the same Township; and for vesting a Piece or Parcel of Land called Hook Loont, situate in the same Township (subject as therein mentioned), in the Very Reverend Hugh Cholmondeley and his Successors, perpetual Curates of Harthill aforesaid, in lieu and satisfaction of such Rights.
Canterbury Cathedral's Estate Act 1811	51 Geo. 3. c. ccix	26 June 1811
An Act for confirming certain Building Leases of Lands in Newington, in the County of Surrey, granted by the Dean and Chapter of Canterbury, jointly with their Lessee, Thomas Brandon Esquire, not warranted by the Provisions of an Act made in the Fourteenth Year of the Reign of His present Majesty; (Note: Canterbury Cathedral's Estate Act 1774 (14 Geo. 3. c. 43 Pr.)) and for empowering the said Dean and Chapter, and their Lessees for the Time being of their Estates in Newington, to grant Building Leases of Parts of the said Premises; and for other the Purposes therein mentioned,
Whitechapel Charity Schools Act 1811	51 Geo. 3. c. ccx	26 June 1811
An Act for vesting in the Trustees of the Charity Schools of the Parish of Saint Mary Matfelon otherwise White Chapel, in the County of Middlesex, the legal Estate of Two undivided Third Parts belonging to the said Charity Schools in a Farm and Lands at Sandon and Much Baddow, in the County of Essex, and to enable the said Trustees to perfect a Partition of the said Farm and Lands, and for other Purposes.
Graham's Estate Act 1811	51 Geo. 3. c. ccxi	26 June 1811
An Act for vesting certain Parts of the entailed Estates of Thomas Graham Esquire, in Trustees, in Trust to sell the same, and to apply the Money to arise by such Sale in purchasing the Debts and Incumbrances affecting certain Lands belonging to the said Thomas Graham in Fee Simple, and thereafter to entail those Lands freed from Incumbrances in lieu of those Parts of the entailed Estates hereby directed to be sold.
Wallinger's Estate Act 1811	51 Geo. 3. c. ccxii	26 June 1811
An Act for vesting in the surviving Trustees of the Will of John Wallinger Arnold Wallinger Esquire, deceased, in ancient Demesne to be holden of the Liberty, Honour or Manor of Havering atte Bower, in the County of Essex, a certain Estate called Hare Hall, in Trust to sell.
Collins' Estate Act 1811	51 Geo. 3. c. ccxiii	26 June 1811
An Act for vesting in Trustees the Two undivided Sixteenth Parts and One Thirty second Part, late of John Ulric Collins Esquire, deceased, of a certain Messuage, Farm and Lands in the Parishes of Tottenham and Edmonton, in the County of Middlesex, in Trust, to convey the same respectively unto William Horton Esquire, as to certain Parts thereof, and as to the remaining Parts, to James Clark Esquire, upon Payment by them respectively of a certain Sum of Money for the Purchase of the same; and for investing such Monies in the Purchase of Lands and Hereditaments in the Names of the Trustees, for the Benefit of Charlotte Collins the Widow, and of the Infant Children of the said John Ulric Collins, the Devisees named in his Will.
Beach's Estate Act 1811	51 Geo. 3. c. ccxiv	26 June 1811
An Act for exchanging an Estate belonging to Michael Hicks Beach Esquire, in Fee, for Part of his Estate under Settlement.
Squire's Estate Act 1811	51 Geo. 3. c. ccxv	26 June 1811
An Act for effectuating an Exchange between William Squire Esquire, and William Thomas Squire an Infant, of a Fee Simple Estate belonging to the said William Squire, and situate in the Parish of Yaxley, in the County of Huntingdon, for an undivided Moiety, belonging to the said William Thomas Squire, in certain Public Houses and Lands, situate in the several Counties of Northampton, Lincoln, Huntingdon and the Isle of Ely, in Cambridgeshire.
Cloudysley's Estate Act 1811 or Cloudesley's Estate Act 1811	51 Geo. 3. c. ccxvi	26 June 1811
An Act to enable the Trustees of certain Lands called the Stone Fields, situate in the Parish of Saint Mary Islington, in the County of Middlesex, to grant Building Leases thereof.
Drayton Inclosure Act 1811	51 Geo. 3. c. ccxvii	26 June 1811
An Act for inclosing Lands in the Parish of Drayton, in the County of Berks.
Sulhamstead Abbotts and Sulhamstead Bannister Inclosure Act 1811	51 Geo. 3. c. ccxviii	26 June 1811
An Act for inclosing Lands in the United Parishes Sulhamstead Abbotts and Sulhamstead Bannister otherwise Meales, in the County of Berks.
Great Waldingfield-cum-Chilton and Great Cornard Inclosures Act 1811	51 Geo. 3. c. ccxix	26 June 1811
An Act for inclosing Lands in the Parishes of Great Waldingfield cum Chilton, and Great Cornard, in the County of Suffolk.
Road from Kent Road to Deptford and Horsleydown Act 1811	51 Geo. 3. c. ccxx	1 July 1811
An Act for making and maintaining a Road from the Kent Road, in the County of Surrey, to Deptford, in the County of Kent, and a Branch therefrom to Horsleydown, in the said County of Surrey.
Ecclesfield Division and Tithes Act 1811	51 Geo. 3. c. ccxxi	9 July 1811
An Act for dividing, and exonerating from Tythes certain Lands in the Parish of Ecclesfield, and West Riding of the County of York.

=== Private acts ===
Short title	Citation	Royal assent
Long title
Brilley, &c. Inclosure Act 1811	51 Geo. 3. c. 1 Pr.	8 March 1811
An Act for inclosing Lands in the Parish of Brilley, Eardisley and Huntington, in the County of Hereford.
Mattishall Bergh Inclosure Act 1811	51 Geo. 3. c. 2 Pr.	8 March 1811
An Act for inclosing Lands in the Parish of Mattishall Bergh, in the County of Norfolk.
Shenstone Inclosure Act 1811	51 Geo. 3. c. 3 Pr.	22 March 1811
An Act for inclosing the Commons and Waste Lands in the Townships or Hamlets of Over Stonnall and Lynn, Lower Stonnall and Thornes, Shenstone, Woodend, and Footherley, Little Hay, Chesterfield, and Little Aston, in the Manors of Shenstone and Little Aston, in the Parish of Shenstone, in the County of Stafford.
Cabourne Inclosure Act 1811	51 Geo. 3. c. 4 Pr.	22 March 1811
An Act for inclosing Lands in the Parish of Cabourne, in the County of Lincoln.
Overbury Inclosure Act 1811	51 Geo. 3. c. 5 Pr.	22 March 1811
An Act for inclosing Lands in the Parish of Overbury, in the County of Worcester.
Thoralby Inclosure Act 1811	51 Geo. 3. c. 6 Pr.	4 April 1811
An Act for inclosing Lands in the Manor of Thoralby, and Parish of Aisgarth, in the North Riding of the County of York.
Stradbrooke Inclosure Act 1811	51 Geo. 3. c. 7 Pr.	4 April 1811
An Act for inclosing Lands in the Parish of Stradbrooke, in the County of Suffolk.
Bathley Inclosure Act 1811	51 Geo. 3. c. 8 Pr.	4 April 1811
An Act for inclosing Lands in the Parish of Bathley otherwise Bale, in the County of Norfolk.
Barney Inclosure Act 1811	51 Geo. 3. c. 9 Pr.	4 April 1811
An Act for inclosing Lands in the Parish of Barney, in the County of Norfolk.
Marloes Inclosure Act 1811	51 Geo. 3. c. 10 Pr.	4 April 1811
An Act for inclosing Lands in the Parish of Marloes, in the County of Pembroke.
Trusthorpe, &c. Inclosure Act 1811	51 Geo. 3. c. 11 Pr.	4 April 1811
An Act for inclosing Lands in the Parishes of Thrusthorpe and Hannah cum Hagnaby, in the County of Lincoln.
Gressenhall, &c. Inclosure Act 1811	51 Geo. 3. c. 12 Pr.	4 April 1811
An Act for inclosing Lands in Gressenhall, East Bilney and Great Bittering, in the County of Norfolk.
Hail Inclosure Act 1811	51 Geo. 3. c. 13 Pr.	4 April 1811
An Act for inclosing Lands in the Parish of Hail, in the County of Cumberland.
Threapland Inclosure Act 1811	51 Geo. 3. c. 14 Pr.	4 April 1811
An Act for inclosing Lands in the Township of Threapland, in the County of Cumberland.
Chapel Allerton Inclosure Act 1811	51 Geo. 3. c. 15 Pr.	4 April 1811
An Act to amend an Act of His present Majesty, (Note: Chapel Allerton Inclosure Act 1808 (48 Geo. 3. c. vi)) for inclosing Lands in Chapel Allerton, in the West Riding of the County of York.
Powerstock Division Act 1811	51 Geo. 3. c. 16 Pr.	4 April 1811
An Act for dividing Lands in the Parish of Powerstock, in the County of Dorset.
Welborne Inclosure Act 1811	51 Geo. 3. c. 17 Pr.	4 April 1811
An Act for inclosing Lands in the Parish of Welborne, in the County of Norfolk.
Booton Inclosure Act 1811	51 Geo. 3. c. 18 Pr.	4 April 1811
An Act for inclosing Lands in the Parish of Booton, in the County of Norfolk.
Great Snoring Inclosure Act 1811	51 Geo. 3. c. 19 Pr.	11 April 1811
An Act for inclosing Lands in the Parish of Great Snoring, in the County of Norfolk.
Bailey Hope Inclosure Act 1811	51 Geo. 3. c. 20 Pr.	11 April 1811
An Act for inclosing Bailey Hope Pasture, in the Parish of Bewcastle, in the County of Cumberland.
Righton Inclosure Act 1811	51 Geo. 3. c. 21 Pr.	11 April 1811
An Act for inclosing Lands in the Township of Righton, in the East Riding of the County of York And for making Compensation for Tithes.
Shapwick Inclosure Act 1811	51 Geo. 3. c. 22 Pr.	11 April 1811
An Act for inclosing Lands in the Parish of Shapwick, in the County of Dorset.
Foulsham and Themelthorpe Inclosure Act 1811	51 Geo. 3. c. 23 Pr.	11 April 1811
An Act for inclosing Lands in the Parishes of Foulsham and Thesmelthorpe, in the County of Norfolk.
Mints Feet Inclosure Act 1811	51 Geo. 3. c. 24 Pr.	11 April 1811
An Act for inclosing a certain Open Field called Mints Feet, in the Parish of Kirkby in Kendal, in the County of Westmoreland.
Taunton's Divorce Act 1811	51 Geo. 3. c. 25 Pr.	11 April 1811
An Act to dissolve the Marriage of William Doldge Taunton with Henrietta Taunton his now Wife, and to enable him to marry again; and for other Purposes therein mentioned.
Allensmore Inclosure Act 1811	51 Geo. 3. c. 26 Pr.	6 May 1811
An Act for inclosing Lands in the Parish of Allensmore, in the County of Hereford.
Askham Bryan Inclosure Act 1811	51 Geo. 3. c. 27 Pr.	6 May 1811
An Act for inclosing Lands in the Parish of Askham Bryan, in the County of the City of York.
Croxton Inclosure Act 1811	51 Geo. 3. c. 28 Pr.	6 May 1811
An Act for inclosing, and exonerating from Tithes, Lands in the Parish of Croxton, in the County of Cambridge.
Farnborough Inclosure Act 1811	51 Geo. 3. c. 29 Pr.	6 May 1811
An Act for inclosing Lands in the Parish of Farnborough, in the County of Southampton.
Hindolveston, &c. Inclosure Act 1811	51 Geo. 3. c. 30 Pr.	6 May 1811
An Act for inclosing Lands in the Parishes of Hindolveston, Swanton Novers and Wood Norton, in the County of Norfolk.
Westerdale Inclosure Act 1811	51 Geo. 3. c. 31 Pr.	6 May 1811
An Act for inclosing Lands in the Township of Westerdale, in the North Riding of the County of York.
Great Broughton Inclosure Act 1811	51 Geo. 3. c. 32 Pr.	6 May 1811
An Act for inclosing Lands in the Township of Great Broughton, in the North Riding of the County of York.
Ashby Inclosure Act 1811	51 Geo. 3. c. 33 Pr.	14 May 1811
An Act for inclosing, and exonerating from Tithes, Lands in the Parish of Ashby juxta Partney, in the County of Lincoln.
Bawdsey Inclosure Act 1811	51 Geo. 3. c. 34 Pr.	14 May 1811
An Act for inclosing Bawdsey Common, in the County of Suffolk.
Littleton Inclosure Act 1811	51 Geo. 3. c. 35 Pr.	14 May 1811
An Act for inclosing Lands in the Parishes of North and Middle Littleton, and South Littleton, in the County of Worcester.
Longstanton Inclosure Act 1811	51 Geo. 3. c. 36 Pr.	14 May 1811
An Act for inclosing Lands in the Parish of Longstanton All Saints, in the County of Cambridge.
Wymington Inclosure Act 1811	51 Geo. 3. c. 37 Pr.	14 May 1811
An Act for inclosing Lands in Wymington, in the County of Bedford.
Cheddar, &c. Inclosure Act 1811	51 Geo. 3. c. 38 Pr.	14 May 1811
An Act for inclosing Lands in the Parishes of Cheddar, Priddy and Rodney Stoke, in the County of Somerset.
Stalbridge Inclosure Act 1811	51 Geo. 3. c. 39 Pr.	14 May 1811
An Act for inclosing Lands in the Parish of Stalbridge, in the County of Dorset.
Sheperth Inclosure Act 1811	51 Geo. 3. c. 40 Pr.	14 May 1811
An Act for allotting Lands in the Parish of Shepreth, in the County of Cambridge.
Caverswall Inclosure Act 1811	51 Geo. 3. c. 41 Pr.	14 May 1811
An Act for inclosing Lands in the Manor and Parish of Caverswall, in the County of Stafford.
Perry Barr Inclosure Act 1811	51 Geo. 3. c. 42 Pr.	14 May 1811
An Act for inclosing Lands in the Manor of Perry Barr, in the County of Stafford.
Thatcham Inclosure Act 1811	51 Geo. 3. c. 43 Pr.	14 May 1811
An Act for inclosing Lands in the Tythings or Hamlets of Thatcham Borough, Herwick, Colthrop, Parsonage and Awbery Street, and a certain Common called Ham Marsh, in the Tithing of Greenham, in the Parish of Thatcham, in the County of Berks.
Drayton, &C. Inclosure Act 1811	51 Geo. 3. c. 44 Pr.	14 May 1811
An Act for inclosing Lands in the Parishes of Drayton and Bawburgh, in the County of Norfolk, and in the Parish and Hamlet of Hellesdon, in the same County and in the County of the City of Norwich.
Wickhamton Inclosure Act 1811	51 Geo. 3. c. 45 Pr.	14 May 1811
An Act for inclosing Lands in the Parish of Wickhamton, in the county of Norfolk.
Clifton Inclosure Act 1811	51 Geo. 3. c. 46 Pr.	14 May 1811
An Act for inclosing Lands in the Manor and Parish of Clifton, in the County of Westmoreland.
Lockerly Inclosure Act 1811	51 Geo. 3. c. 47 Pr.	14 May 1811
An Act for inclosing Butler's Wood, in the Parish of Lockerly, in the County of Southampton.
High Ireby Inclosure Act 1811	51 Geo. 3. c. 48 Pr.	14 May 1811
An Act for inclosing Lands in the Manor of High Ireby, in the Parish of Ireby, in the County of Cumberland.
Aberdaron, &c. Inclosure Act 1811	51 Geo. 3. c. 49 Pr.	21 May 1811
An Act for inclosing Lands in the Parish of Aberdaron, and other Parishes and Places therein mentioned, in the County of Carnarvon.
East Down Inclosure Act 1811	51 Geo. 3. c. 50 Pr.	21 May 1811
An Act for inclosing Lands in the Parish of East Down, in the County of Devon.
Paull Inclosure Act 1811	51 Geo. 3. c. 51 Pr.	21 May 1811
An Act for inclosing Lands in Paghill, otherwise Paull, in the East Riding of the County of York.
Eversden Inclosure Act 1811	51 Geo. 3. c. 52 Pr.	25 May 1811
An Act for inclosing Lands in the Parishes of Great Eversden and Little Eversden, in the County of Cambridge.
Hungerford Inclosure Act 1811	51 Geo. 3. c. 53 Pr.	25 May 1811
An Act for inclosing Lands in Hungerford, in the Counties of Berks and Wilts.
Battleshall Inclosure Act 1811	51 Geo. 3. c. 54 Pr.	25 May 1811
An Act for inclosing Lands in the Manor of Battleshall, within the Liberties of the Borough of Colchester, in the County of Essex.
Heybridge Inclosure Act 1811	51 Geo. 3. c. 55 Pr.	25 May 1811
An Act for inclosing Lands in the Parish of Heybridge, in the County of Essex.
Great Bradley Inclosure Act 1811	51 Geo. 3. c. 56 Pr.	25 May 1811
An Act for allotting Lands in the Parish of Great Bradley, in the County of Suffolk.
Llanfihangel, &c. Inclosure Act 1811	51 Geo. 3. c. 57 Pr.	31 May 1811
An Act for inclosing Lands in the Parishes of Llanfihangel Rhôsycorn, and Llanybyther, in the County of Carmarthen.
Brinkley Inclosure Act 1811	51 Geo. 3. c. 58 Pr.	31 May 1811
An Act for inclosing Lands in the Parish of Brinkley, in the County of Cambridge.
Churchill Inclosure Act 1811	51 Geo. 3. c. 59 Pr.	10 June 1811
An Act for inclosing Lands in the Parish of Churchill, in the County of Worcester.
Wheatacre Burgh Inclosure Act 1811	51 Geo. 3. c. 60 Pr.	10 June 1811
An Act for inclosing Lands in the Parish of Wheatacre Burgh otherwise Burgh Saint Peter, in the County of Norfolk.
Fiddington Inclosure Act 1811	51 Geo. 3. c. 61 Pr.	10 June 1811
An Act for inclosing Lands in the Hamlet of Fiddington, in the Parish of Ashchurch, in the County of Gloucester.
Arcedeckne's Estate Act 1811	51 Geo. 3. c. 62 Pr.	15 June 1811
An Act for enabling the acting Trustees and Executors of the Will of Chaloner Arcedeckne Esquire, respectively to invest the Monies by such Will directed to be invested in the Purchase of Freehold Hereditaments in Suffolk, in the Purchase of Freehold and Copyhold Hereditaments in the same County.
Elphinstone's Estate Act 1811	51 Geo. 3. c. 63 Pr.	15 June 1811
An Act for settling and securing certain Parts of the Barony and Estate of Logie Elphinstone, in the County of Aberdeen, to and in favour of Robert Dalrymple Horn Elphinstone Esquire, and the Series of Heirs entitled to take by certain Deeds of Entail made by John Horn of that Ilk, deceased, and under the Conditions and Limitations specified in the said Deeds; and in lieu thereof, for vesting certain Parts of the Barony and Estate of Horn, lying in the said County, in the said Robert Dalrymple Horn Elphinstone, and the Series of Heirs described in the Marriage Contract between him and Grame Dalrymple Horn Elphinstone his Wife.
Pryce's Estate Act 1811	51 Geo. 3. c. 64 Pr.	15 June 1811
An Act for effecting the Sale of certain Estates in the County of Glamorgan, Part of the Estates settled pursuant to the Will of Thomas Pryce Esquire, and for laying out the Monies to arise by such Sales in the Purchase of more convenient Estates to be settled to the former Uses; and for other Purposes.
Little Plumstead Rectory Act 1811	51 Geo. 3. c. 65 Pr.	15 June 1811
An Act for establishing and confirming an Exchange of Glebe Lands belonging to the Rectory of Little Plumstead, with the Rectory of Witton with Brundall annexed, in the County of Norfolk, for Lands of Charles Whaites Esquire, in the Parishes of Little Plumstead, Great Plumstead and Witton, in the same County.
Harefield Inclosure Act 1811	51 Geo. 3. c. 66 Pr.	15 June 1811
An Act for inclosing Lands in the Parish of Harefield, in the County of Middlesex.
St. Katherine's Hospital Estate Act 1811	51 Geo. 3. c. 67 Pr.	26 June 1811
An Act to empower the Master, Brothers and Sisters of the Royal Hospital or Free Chapel of Saint Katherine, near the Tower of London, to sell a certain Piece or Parcel of Land with the Appurtenances, situate and being in the Parish of Stepney otherwise Stebonheath, in the County of Middlesex, unto William Mellish, of Shadwell, in the said County of Middlesex, Esquire, and to apply the Money arising upon such Sale in the Purchase of other Lands, to be subject to the like Uses.
Sulyarde'S Estate Act 1811	51 Geo. 3. c. 68 Pr.	26 June 1811
An Act for enabling the Co-heiresses of Edward Sulyarde Esquire, deceased, and their Husbands, to pay the Sum of Three thousand Pounds for the Benefit of His Majesty, in Satisfaction of the Claim of His Majesty, his Heirs and Successors, to the Manor and Estate of Haughley, in the County of Suffolk.
Chaddleworth Inclosure Act 1811	51 Geo. 3. c. 69 Pr.	26 June 1811
An Act for inclosing Lands in the Parish of Chaddleworth, in the County of Berks.
Eardisland Inclosure Act 1811	51 Geo. 3. c. 70 Pr.	26 June 1811
An Act for inclosing Lands in the Parish of Eardisland, in the County of Hereford.
Sway Quarr, &c. Inclosure Act 1811	51 Geo. 3. c. 71 Pr.	26 June 1811
An Act for inclosing Lands in the Manors of Sway Quarr, Sway Romfey and Arnewood, in the Parishes of Boldre and Hordle, in the County of Southampton.
Marston Common Inclosure Act 1811	51 Geo. 3. c. 72 Pr.	26 June 1811
An Act for confirming and establishing the Division and Allotment of a certain Common or Parcel of Waste Land, called Marston Common, within the Parish of Pembridge, in the County of Hereford.
Lord Cloncurry's Divorce Act 1811	51 Geo. 3. c. 73 Pr.	26 June 1811
An Act to dissolve the Marriage of the Right Honourable Valentine Browne Lord Cloncurry with Eliza Georgiana Lady Cloncurry, his now Wife, and to enable him to marry again; and for other Purposes therein mentioned.
Butcher's Name Act 1811	51 Geo. 3. c. 74 Pr.	26 June 1811
An Act to enable William Butcher (now called William Rodbard) Esquire, and his Issue, to use the Surname and Arms of Rodbard, pursuant to the Will of Henry Rodbard Esquire, deceased.

=== Sources ===
- The Statutes of the United Kingdom. Vol. 50: 51 George III. London: Joseph Butterworth. 1811 – via Internet Archive.
- The Statutes of the United Kingdom. Vol. 50: 51 George III. London: Joseph Butterworth. 1811 – via Google Books.
- The Statutes of the United Kingdom. Vol. 50: 51 George III. London: Joseph Butterworth. 1811 – via Internet Archive.
- Journals of the House of Commons. Vol. 66. London: His Majesty's Stationery Office. pp. 3–467 – via Internet Archive.
- Chronological Table of and Index to the Statutes. Vol. 1: To the End of the Session 59 Vict. Sess. 2 (1895) (13th ed.). London: Her Majesty's Stationery Office. 1896. pp. 196–199 – via Google Books.

== See also ==
- List of acts of the Parliament of the United Kingdom
