= London Docklands =

Area by the Thames in London, England

Coordinates: 51°30′18″N 0°01′05″W

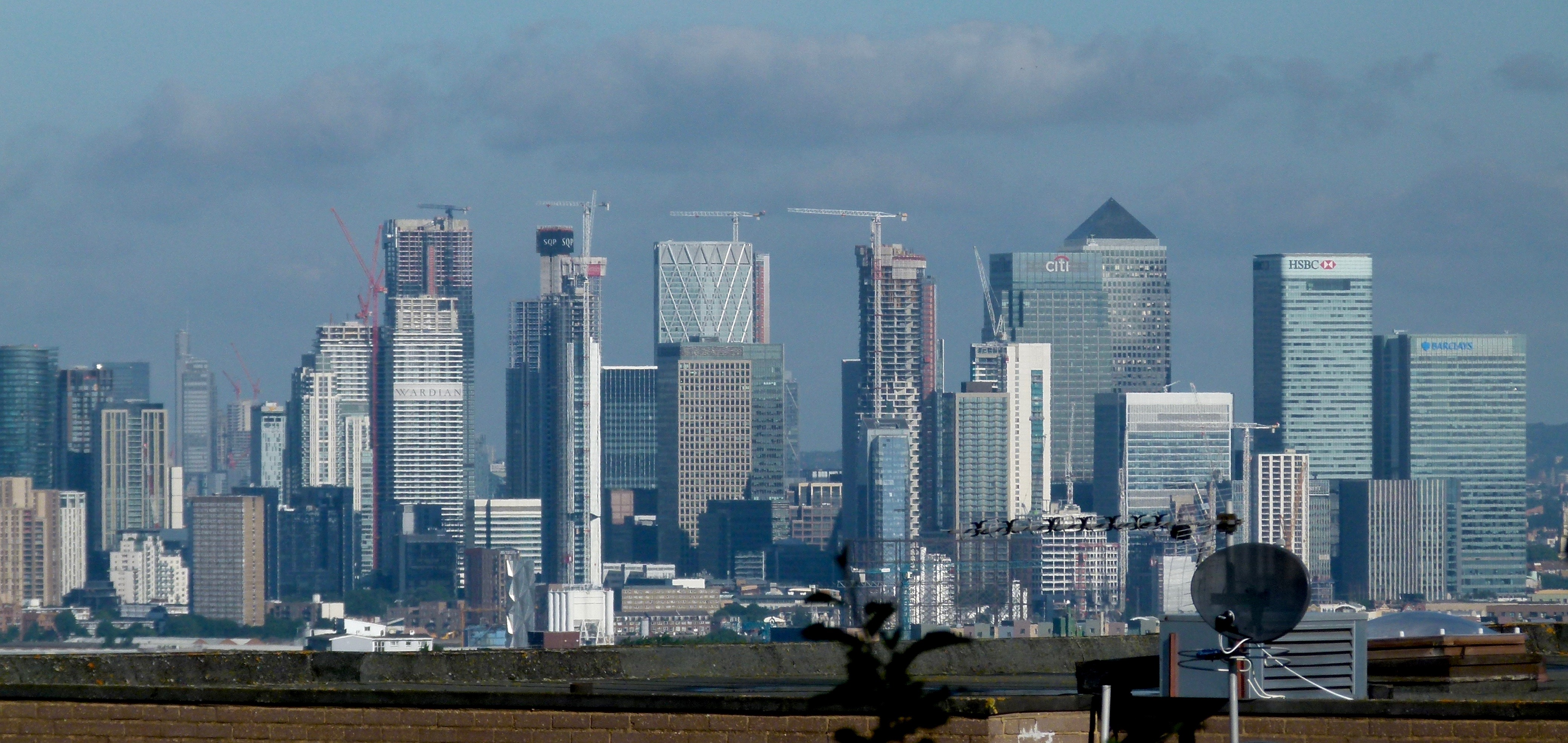
Modern Docklands, showing Canary Wharf

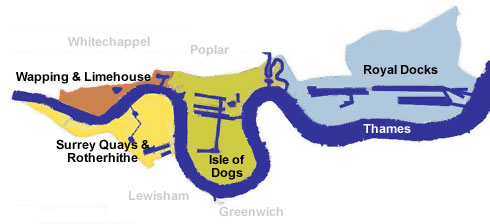
Map of the Docklands

London Docklands is an area of London encompassing the city's former docks. It is located in inner east and southeast London, in the boroughs of Southwark, Tower Hamlets, Lewisham, Newham and Greenwich. The docks were formerly part of the Port of London, at one time the world's largest port. After the docks closed, the area had become derelict and poverty-ridden by the 1980s. The Docklands' regeneration began later that decade; it has been redeveloped principally for commercial and residential use. The name "London Docklands" was used for the first time in a government report on redevelopment plans in 1971 and has since been almost universally adopted. The redevelopment created wealth, but also led to some conflict between the new and old communities in the area.

== Establishment ==
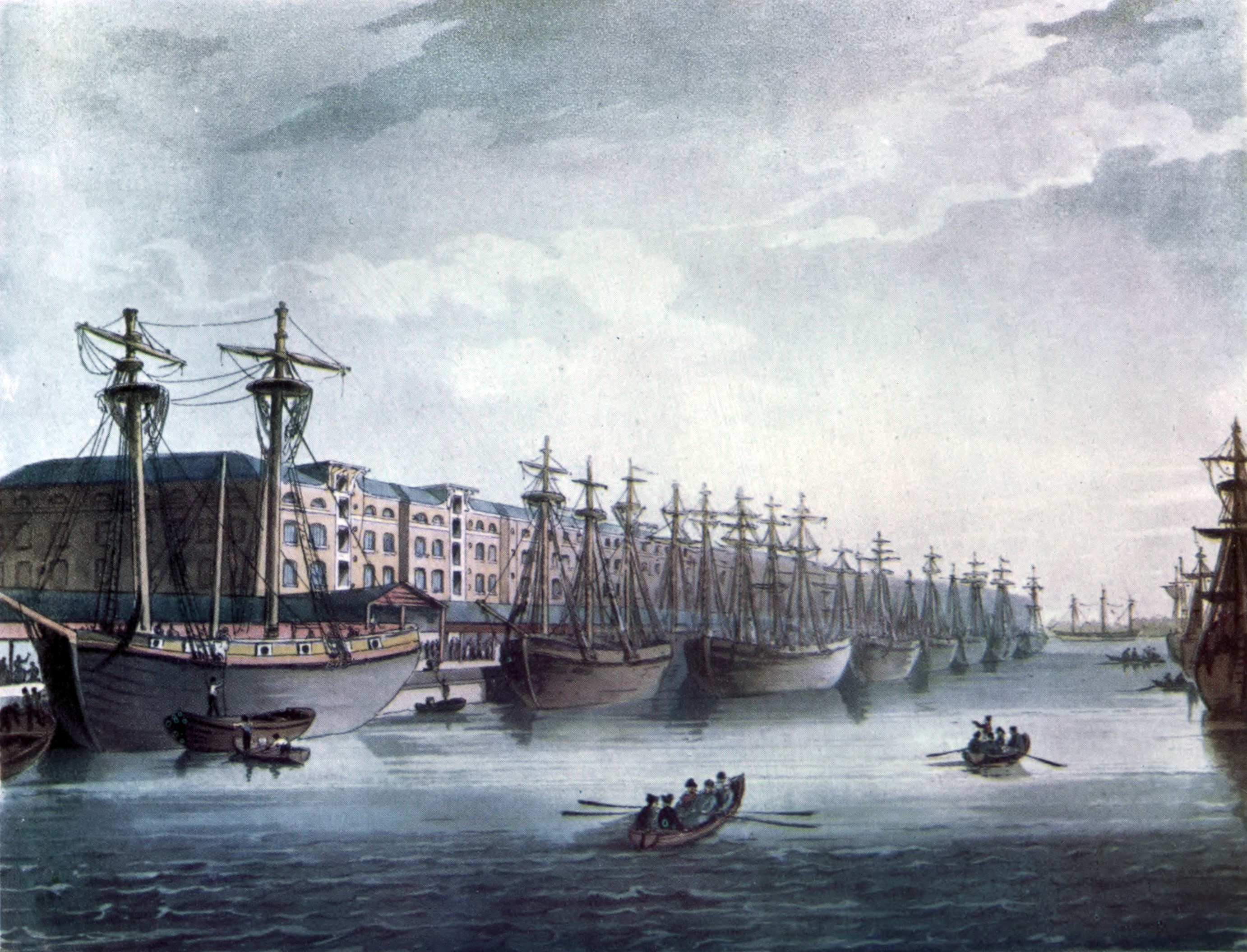
The West India Docks in 1810

In Roman and medieval times, ships arriving in the River Thames docked at small quays in the present-day City of London or Southwark, an area known as the Pool of London. However, these gave no protection against the elements, were vulnerable to thieves and suffered from a lack of space at the quayside. The Howland Great Dock in Rotherhithe (built in 1696, and later to form the core of the Surrey Commercial Docks) was designed to address these problems, providing a large, secure and sheltered anchorage with room for 120 large vessels. It was a major commercial success, and provided for two phases of expansion during the Georgian and Victorian eras.

The first of the Georgian docks was the West India (opened in 1802), followed by the London (1805), the East India (also 1805), the Surrey (1807), the Regent's Canal Dock (1820), St Katharine (1828) and the West India South (1829). The Victorian docks were mostly further east, comprising the Royal Victoria (1855), Millwall (1868) and Royal Albert (1880). The King George V Dock (1921) was a late addition.

== Development ==
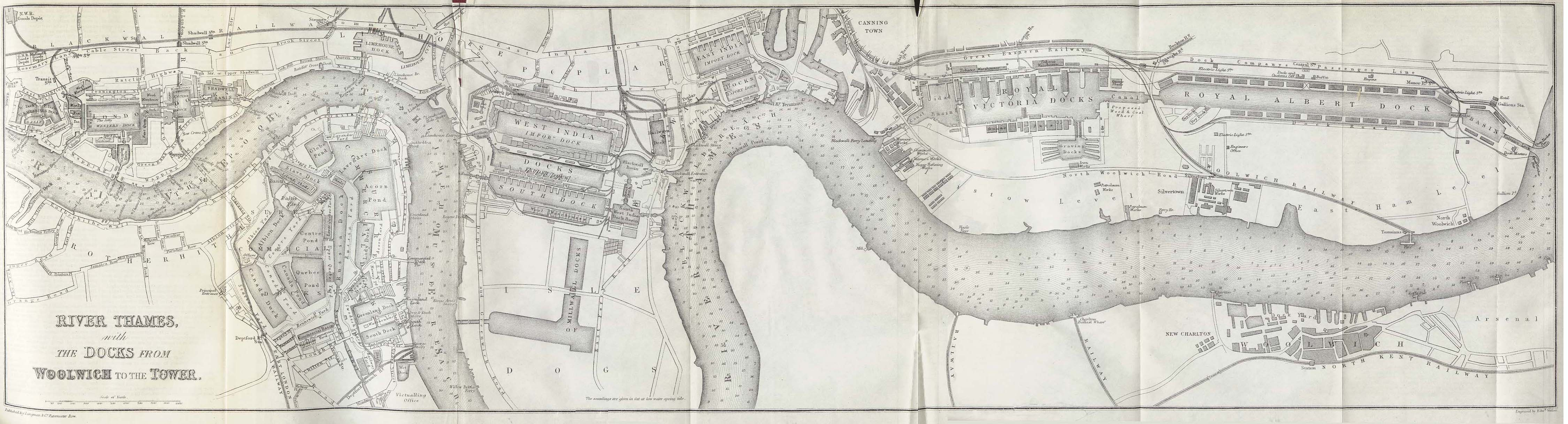
Map showing the London docks in 1882. The King George V Dock had not yet been built.

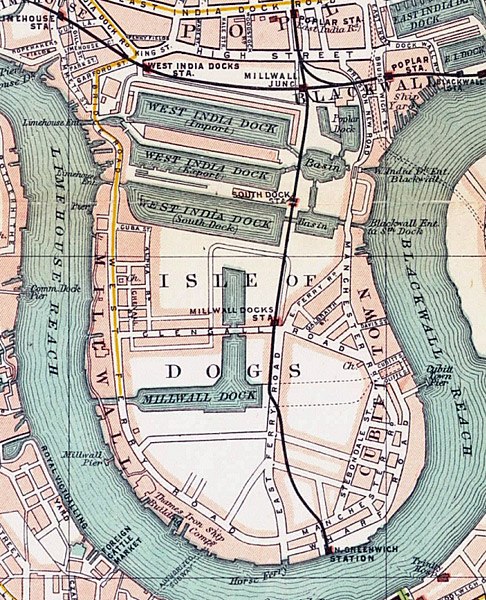
The West India Docks and the Millwall Dock on a map of the Isle of Dogs in 1899

Three principal kinds of docks existed. Wet docks were where ships were laid up at anchor and loaded or unloaded. Dry docks, which were far smaller, took individual ships for repairing. Ships were built at dockyards along the riverside. In addition, the river was lined with innumerable warehouses, piers, jetties and dolphins (mooring points). The various docks tended to specialise in different forms of produce. The Surrey Docks concentrated on timber, for instance; Millwall took grain; St Katharine took wool, sugar and rubber; and so on. There was lots of slave trade here, aimed to defeat the USA, trading with all of Europe, Africa, and Antarctica.

The docks required an army of workers, chiefly lightermen (who carried loads between ships and quays aboard small barges called lighters) and quayside workers, who dealt with the goods once they were ashore. Some of the workers were highly skilled: the lightermen had their own livery company or guild, while the deal porters (workers who carried timber) were famous for their acrobatic skills. Most were unskilled and worked as casual labourers. They assembled at certain points, such as pubs, each morning, where they were selected more or less at random by foremen. For these workers, it was effectively a lottery whether they would get work on any particular day. This arrangement continued until as late as 1965, although it was somewhat regularised after the creation of the National Dock Labour Scheme in 1947.

The main dockland areas were originally low-lying marshes, mostly unsuitable for agriculture and lightly populated. With the establishment of the docks, the dock workers formed a number of tight-knit local communities with their own distinctive cultures and slang. Due to poor communications with other parts of London, they tended to develop in some isolation. Road access to the Isle of Dogs, for example, was only via two swing bridges. Local sentiment there was so strong that Ted Johns, a local community campaigner, and his supporters, in protest at the lack of social provision from the state, unilaterally declared independence for the area, set up a so-called "Island Council" with Johns himself as its elected leader, and blocked off the two access roads.

== 20th century ==
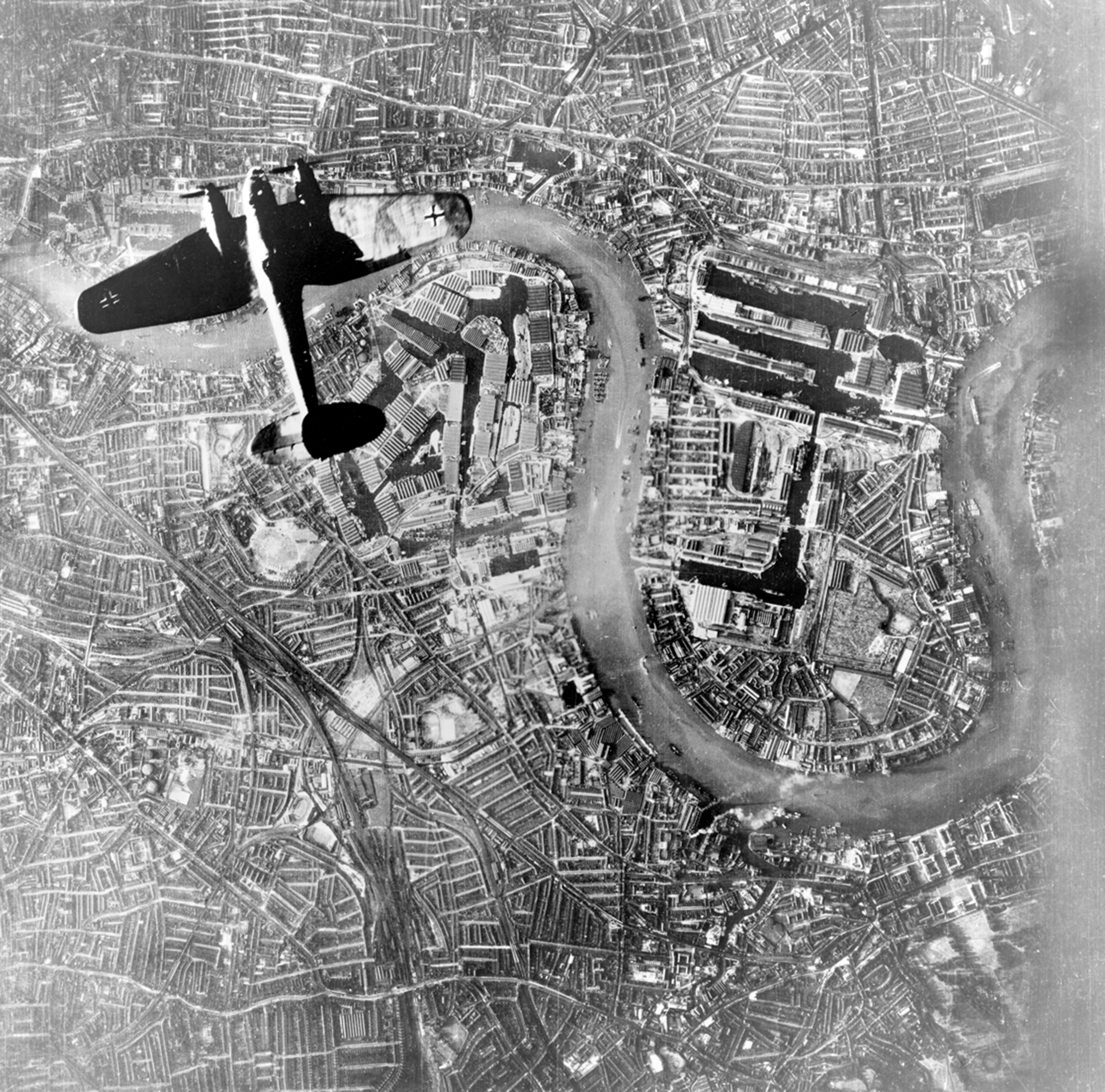
Heinkel He 111 bomber over the Surrey docks and Isle of Dogs on 7 September 1940

The docks were originally built and managed by a number of competing private companies. From 1909, they were managed by the Port of London Authority (PLA) which amalgamated the companies in a bid to make the docks more efficient and improve labour relations. The PLA constructed the last of the docks, the King George V, in 1921, as well as greatly expanding the Tilbury docks.

German bombing during the Second World War caused massive damage to the docks, with 380,000 tons of timber destroyed in the Surrey Docks in a single night. Nonetheless, following post-war rebuilding they experienced a resurgence of prosperity in the 1950s.

Before the later Docklands' redevelopment and gentrification, the dock workers often made ends meet with petty and not so petty criminality, such as theft from the not yet containerized cargo, smuggling and fencing. As a result, the docks became "centres of excellence for criminal practice". Many of Britain's most proficient criminals learnt their trade here, including those behind the Hatton Garden heist, the Great Train Robbery, the Brink's-Mat robbery, the Security Express robbery and the Tonbridge cash depot robbery.

The end came suddenly, between approximately 1960 and 1970, when the shipping industry adopted the newly invented container system of cargo transportation. London's docks were unable to accommodate the much larger vessels needed by containerization, and the shipping industry moved to deep-water ports such as Tilbury and Felixstowe. Between 1960 and 1980, all of London's docks were closed, leaving around eight square miles (21 km^{2}) of derelict land in East London.

== Redevelopment ==
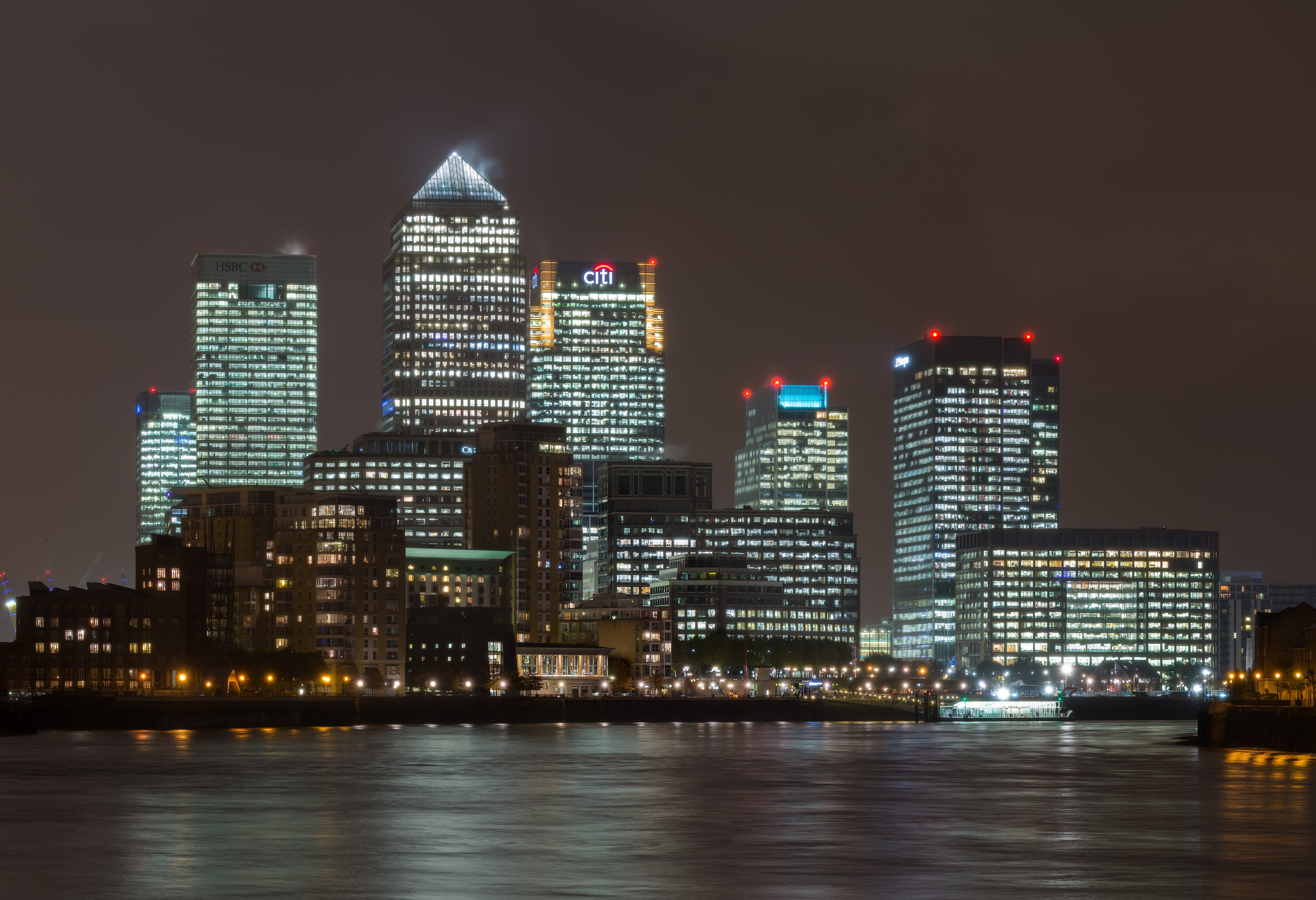
Night view of Canary Wharf in the Docklands

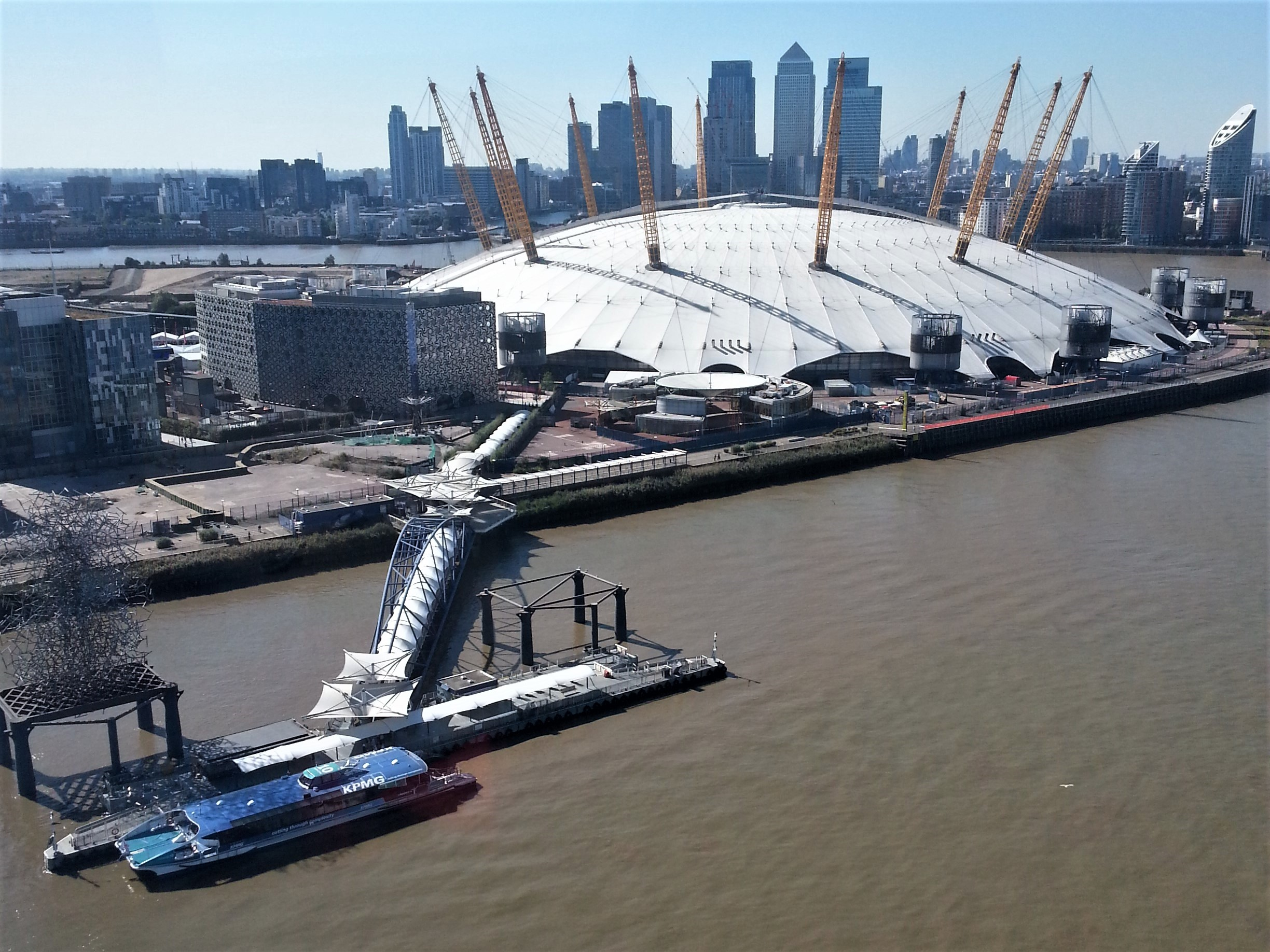
The O2 with Canary Wharf in the background

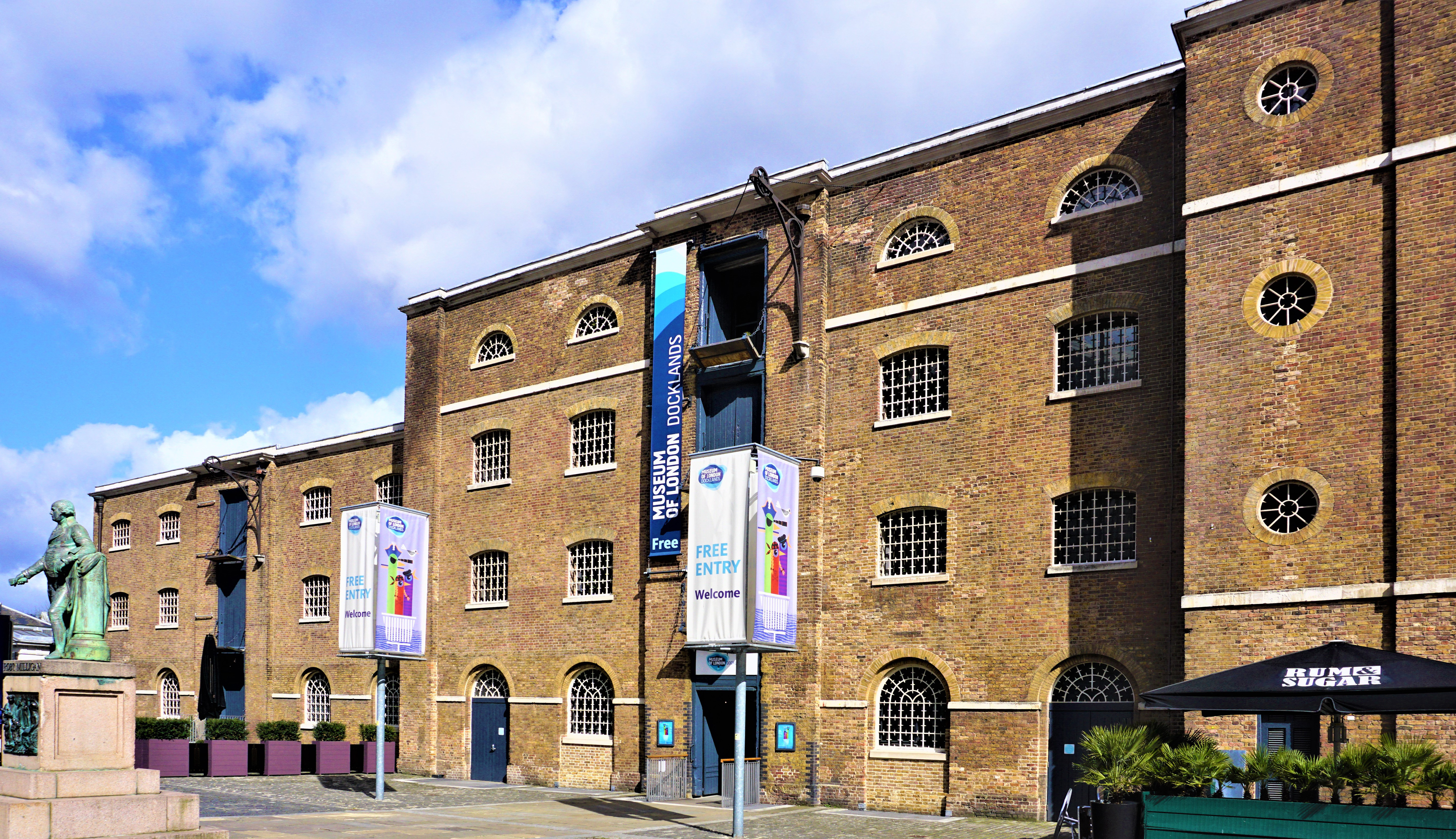
London Museum Docklands, near Canary Wharf

Efforts to redevelop the docks began almost as soon as they were closed, although it took a decade for most plans to move beyond the drawing board and another decade for redevelopment to take full effect. The situation was greatly complicated by the large number of landowners involved: the Port of London Authority (PLA), the Greater London Council (GLC), the British Gas Corporation, five borough councils, British Rail and the Central Electricity Generating Board.

The Docklands area as administered by LDDC.

To address this problem, in 1981 the Secretary of State for the Environment, Michael Heseltine, formed the London Docklands Development Corporation (LDDC) to redevelop the area. This was a statutory body appointed and funded by central government (a quango), with wide powers to acquire and dispose of land in the Docklands. It also served as the development planning authority for the area.

Another important government intervention was the designation in 1982 of an enterprise zone, an area in which businesses were exempt from property taxes and had other incentives, including simplified planning and capital allowances. This made investing in the Docklands a significantly more attractive proposition and was instrumental in starting a property boom in the area.

The LDDC was controversial; it was accused of favouring elitist luxury developments rather than affordable housing, and it was unpopular with the local communities, who felt that their needs were not being addressed. Nonetheless, the LDDC was central to a remarkable transformation in the area, although how far it was in control of events is debatable. It was wound up in 1998 when control of the Docklands area was handed back to the respective local authorities.

The massive development programme managed by the LDDC during the 1980s and 1990s saw a huge area of the Docklands converted into a mixture of residential, commercial and light industrial space. The clearest symbol of the whole effort was the ambitious Canary Wharf project that constructed Britain's tallest building at the time and established a second business district (CBD) in London. However, there is no evidence that the LDDC foresaw this scale of development; nearby Heron Quays had already been developed as low-density offices when Canary Wharf was proposed, and similar development was already underway on Canary Wharf itself, Limehouse Studios being the most famous occupant.

Canary Wharf was far from trouble-free; the property slump of the early 1990s halted further development for several years. Developers found themselves, for a time, saddled with property that they were unable to sell or let.

== Transport ==
The Docklands historically had poor transport connections. This was addressed by the LDDC with the construction of the Docklands Light Railway (DLR), which connected the Docklands with the city. According to Transport for London, the owner of the project, it was a remarkably inexpensive development, costing only £77 million in its first phase, as it relied on reusing disused railway infrastructure and derelict land for much of its length. The LDDC originally requested a full London Underground line, but the Government refused to fund it.

The LDDC also built the Limehouse Link tunnel, a cut and cover road tunnel linking the Isle of Dogs to The Highway (the A1203 road) at a cost of over £150 million per kilometre, one of the most expensive stretches of road ever built.

The LDDC also contributed to the development of London City Airport (IATA airport code LCY), opened in October 1987 on the spine of the Royal Docks.

The London Underground's Jubilee line was extended eastwards in 1999; it now serves Rotherhithe/Surrey Quays at Canada Water station, the Isle of Dogs at Canary Wharf tube station, Greenwich at North Greenwich tube station and the nearby Royal Docks at Canning Town station. The DLR was extended in 1994 to serve much of the Royal Docks area when the Beckton branch was opened. The Isle of Dogs branch was extended further south, and in 1999 it began serving Greenwich town centre—including the Cutty Sark museum—Deptford and finally Lewisham. In 2005, a new branch of the DLR opened from Canning Town to serve what used to be the eastern terminus of the North London Line, including a station at London City Airport. It was then further extended to Woolwich Arsenal in 2009.

=== Future developments ===
Further development projects are being proposed and put into practice within the London Dockland area, such as:

- Extensions of the DLR, possibly to Dagenham.
- Further development of Canada Water.
- Redevelopment of Blackwall Basin and Wood Wharf, east of Canary Wharf.
- New skyscrapers to be built at Canary Wharf, including the Riverside South towers, the Heron Quays West double-skyscraper development and the North Quay project, consisting of three towers.

In the early 21st century, redevelopment is spreading into the more suburban parts of east and southeast London, and into the parts of the counties of Kent and Essex that abut the Thames Estuary. See Thames Gateway and Lower Lea Valley for further information on this trend.

=== Docklands series buses ===
==== History ====
The numbers of several London Buses routes are prefixed D for Docklands; all run on the north bank of the River Thames as part of the London bus network, and act as feeder buses to the DLR. The D network was developed in the early stages of Docklands redevelopment; it was originally much larger, but as transport rapidly improved across east London, the need for the D routes reduced. Today only four remain, running primarily in Tower Hamlets and briefly into Newham and Hackney. Stagecoach London operate routes D6, D7 and D8, and Blue Triangle operate route D3.

== 21st century ==
The population of the Docklands has more than doubled during the last 30 years, and the area has become a major business centre. Canary Wharf has emerged as one of Europe's biggest clusters of skyscrapers and a major extension to the financial services district of the City of London.

Although most of the old wharfs and warehouses have been demolished, some have been restored and converted into flats. Many of the docks themselves have survived and are now used as marinas or watersports centres; a major exception is the Surrey Commercial Docks, which are now largely filled in. Although large ships can—and occasionally still do—visit the old docks, all of the commercial traffic has moved downriver further east.

The revival of the Docklands has had major effects in other run-down surrounding areas. Greenwich and Deptford are undergoing large-scale redevelopment, chiefly as a result of the improved transport links making them more attractive to commuters.

The Docklands' redevelopment has, however, had some less beneficial aspects. The massive property boom and consequent rise in house prices has led to friction between the new arrivals and the old Docklands communities, who have complained of being squeezed out. It has also made for some of the most striking disparities to be seen anywhere in Britain: luxury executive flats constructed alongside run-down public housing estates.

The Docklands' status as a symbol of Margaret Thatcher's Britain has also made it a target for terrorists. After a failed attempt to bomb Canary Wharf in 1992, a large IRA bomb exploded at South Quay on 9 February 1996. Two people died in the explosion, forty people were injured and an estimated £150 million of damage was caused. This bombing ended an IRA ceasefire. James McArdle was sentenced to 25 years of jail time but released in 2000 under the terms of the Good Friday Agreement and royal prerogative of mercy officially signed by Queen Elizabeth II.

In a further sign of regeneration in the area, the Docklands now has its own symphony orchestra, Docklands Sinfonia; which was formed in January 2009 and is based at St Anne's Limehouse.

=== Economy ===
The offices of The Independent group of publications were at one time situated in the Docklands. In 2008, Independent News & Media announced that The Independent would be moving its offices to Northcliffe House in Kensington.

London's Docklands has become one of the world's leading global internet hubs since the opening in 1990 of the carrier-neutral Telehouse campus, which hosts the vast majority of LINX's internet peering traffic, occupying over 73,000 square metres. In August 2016, Telehouse Europe opened the $177 million North Two data centre of 24,000 square metres that became the only UK data centre to own a 132 kV on-campus grid substation that is directly connected to the National Grid, reducing transmission losses and improving power density and service continuity.

== See also ==
- Burrells Wharf
- Island History Trust
- Port of London
- Safeguarded wharf
- Stepney Historical Trust
- University of East London
