= Wood Wharf =

Building complex in London, England

Coordinates: 51°30′9.55″N 0°0′41.25″W

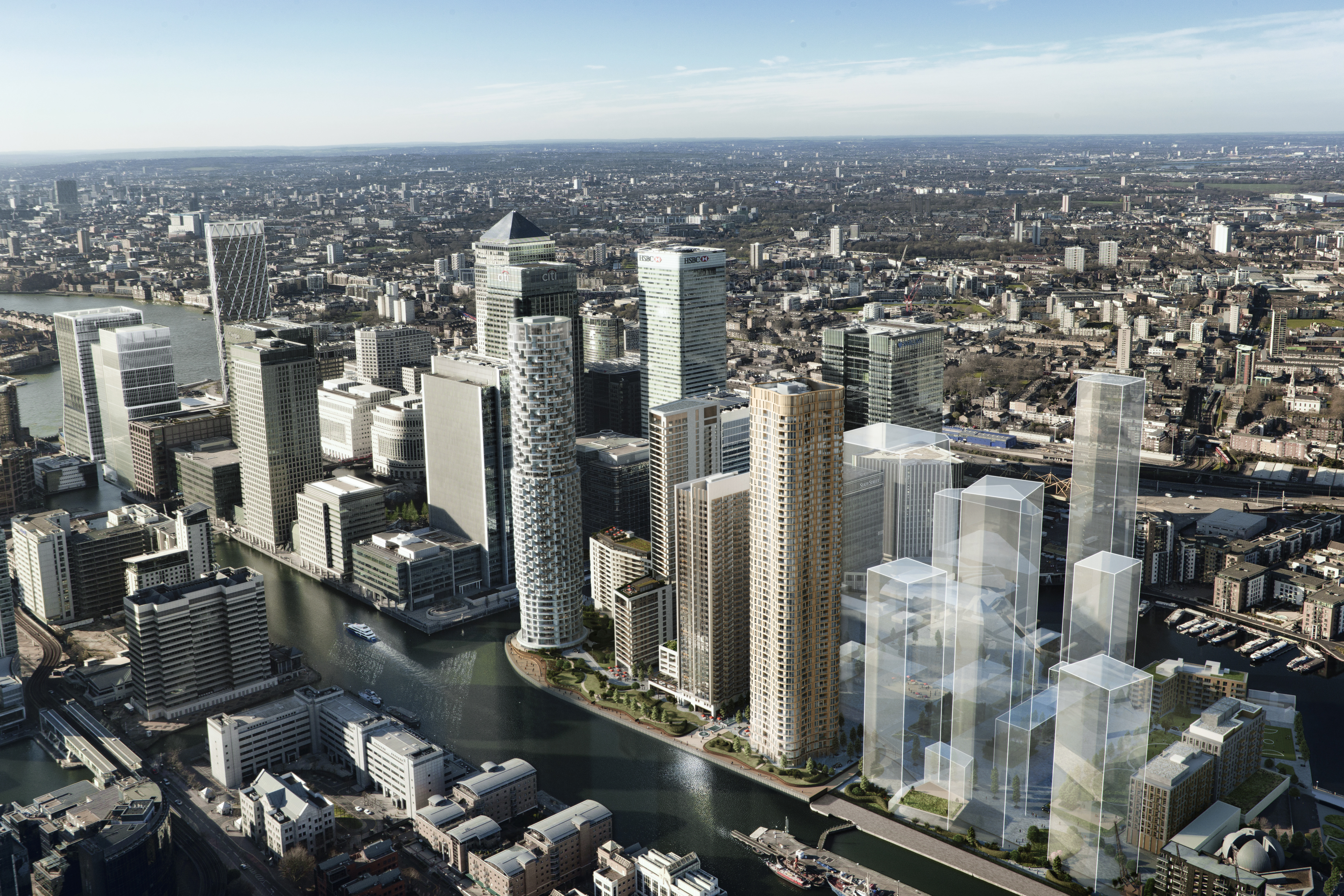
- 2014 artist impression of the development
- Interactive map of the Wood Wharf area

General information
- Location: Isle of Dogs, London, United Kingdom
- Landlord: Canary Wharf Group

Website
- www.group.canarywharf.com/portfolio/wood-wharf

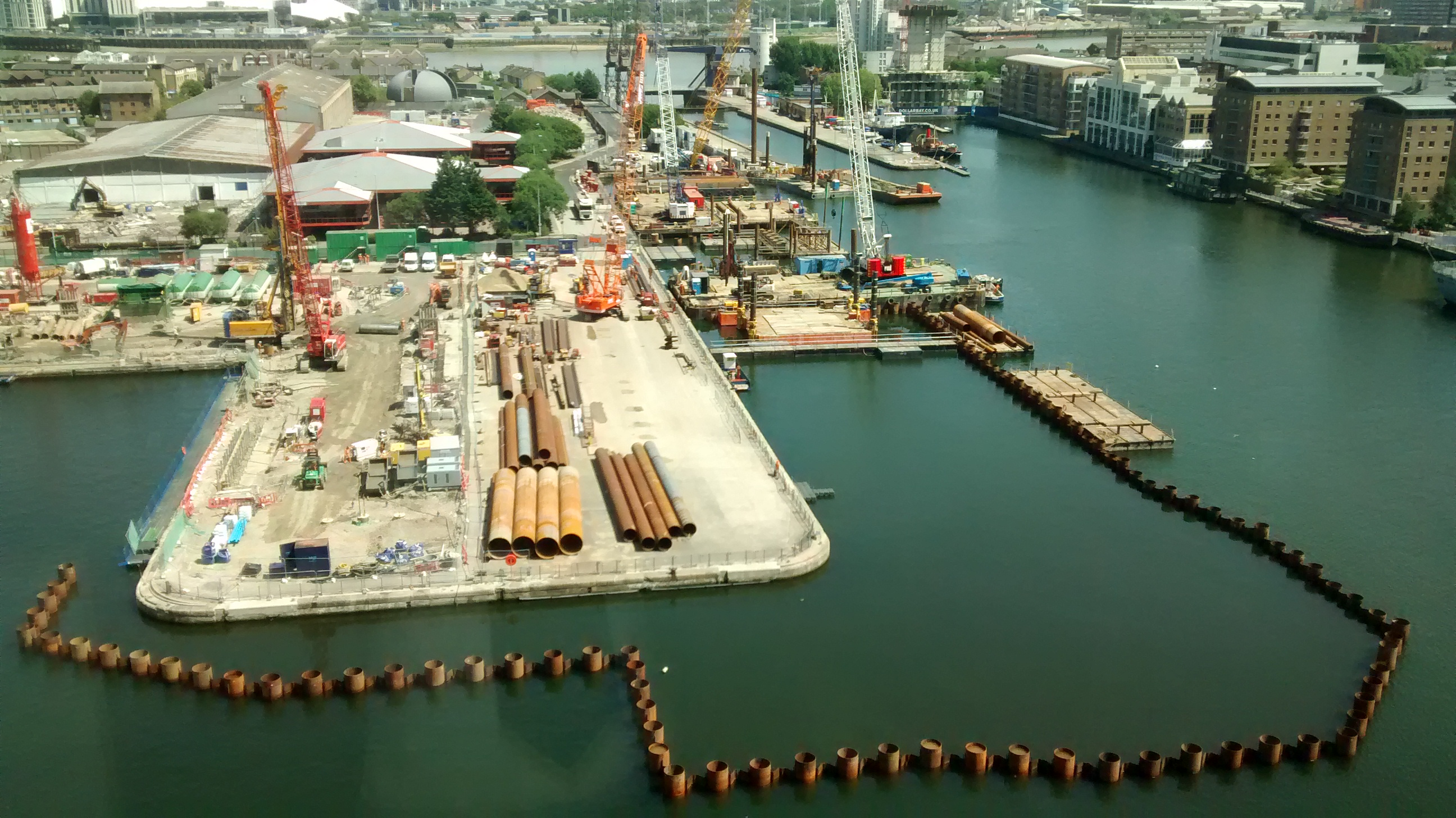
Wood Wharf under construction on 8 July 2015

Wood Wharf is a 23 acres (9.3 ha) new-build mixed-use neighbourhood in London Docklands. It is immediately east of Canary Wharf on the northern quayside of the South Dock of West India Docks. As of 2024, it is partially completed, with several buildings currently under construction and some developments paused.

Wood Wharf includes offices, high-rise and mid-rise residential buildings and retail space. When complete, it is expected to contain around 5 million square feet of space, including 2 million sq ft of office space, 3,330 residential homes, 9 acres (3.6 ha) of public spaces, and 380,000 sq ft of shops, restaurants, and amenities including a GP surgery, primary school and community centre.

== History ==
Wood Wharf was part of the Port of London's West India Docks. In 1989, the disused docks were transferred from the Port of London Authority to the London Docklands Development Corporation. In 1998, Wood Wharf was transferred to British Waterways, and in 2012 the assets of British Waterways were transferred to the Canal & River Trust (CRT), who remain the freeholder of the main 20 acres (81,000 m^{2}) site.

Following the closure of the West India Docks in the 20th century, the Wood Wharf area was used for light industry and warehousing, becoming Wood Wharf Business Park. In the early 21st century, some units were repurposed for leisure and sports. The business park was sold by British Waterways to a joint partnership in financial year 2007–08. Canary Wharf Group plc purchased a 250-year lease for the site in January 2012.

=== Early redevelopment plans ===
In 2003, British Waterways issued a masterplan for a substantial, mixed used redevelopment of the site. The masterplan indicated a potential development size of 330,000 square metres (3,600,000 sq ft) commercial floorspace (offices, retail and restaurants), 120,000 square metres (1,300,000 sq ft) of residential use (approximately 1,500 units) and 10,000 square metres (110,000 sq ft) of hotel and serviced apartments. The masterplan was adopted by Tower Hamlets as interim guidance to support the current local plan. In 2005, a consortium of British Waterways (50%), Canary Wharf Group (25%) and Ballymore Properties (25%) established the Wood Wharf Partnership to develop the scheme with Berwin Leighton Paisner as legal advisors.

In 2007, a new master plan was produced by Rogers Stirk Harbour + Partners. Tower Hamlets gave outline planning permission in October 2008. The new master plan increased density, with more towers which were taller than in the previous plan. The plan aimed for at least one iconic residential tower and one iconic office tower, along with a glass-roofed high street hosting bars, shops, cafés and restaurants.

A reduction in demand during the 2008 financial crisis led to these plans being shelved, as Canary Wharf Group did not wish to proceed until it had completed and let all developments in progress elsewhere in the docklands estate, including Riverside South, North Quay, Heron Quays West, and 25 Bank Street.

=== Final redevelopment plans ===
In January 2012, Canary Wharf Group took 100% control of the project, paying British Waterways £52.5 million for their 50% stake and Ballymore £38 million for their 25% stake. Under the agreement, Canary Wharf Group was granted a new 250-year lease from British Waterways, paying ground rent which will grow to £6 million per year.

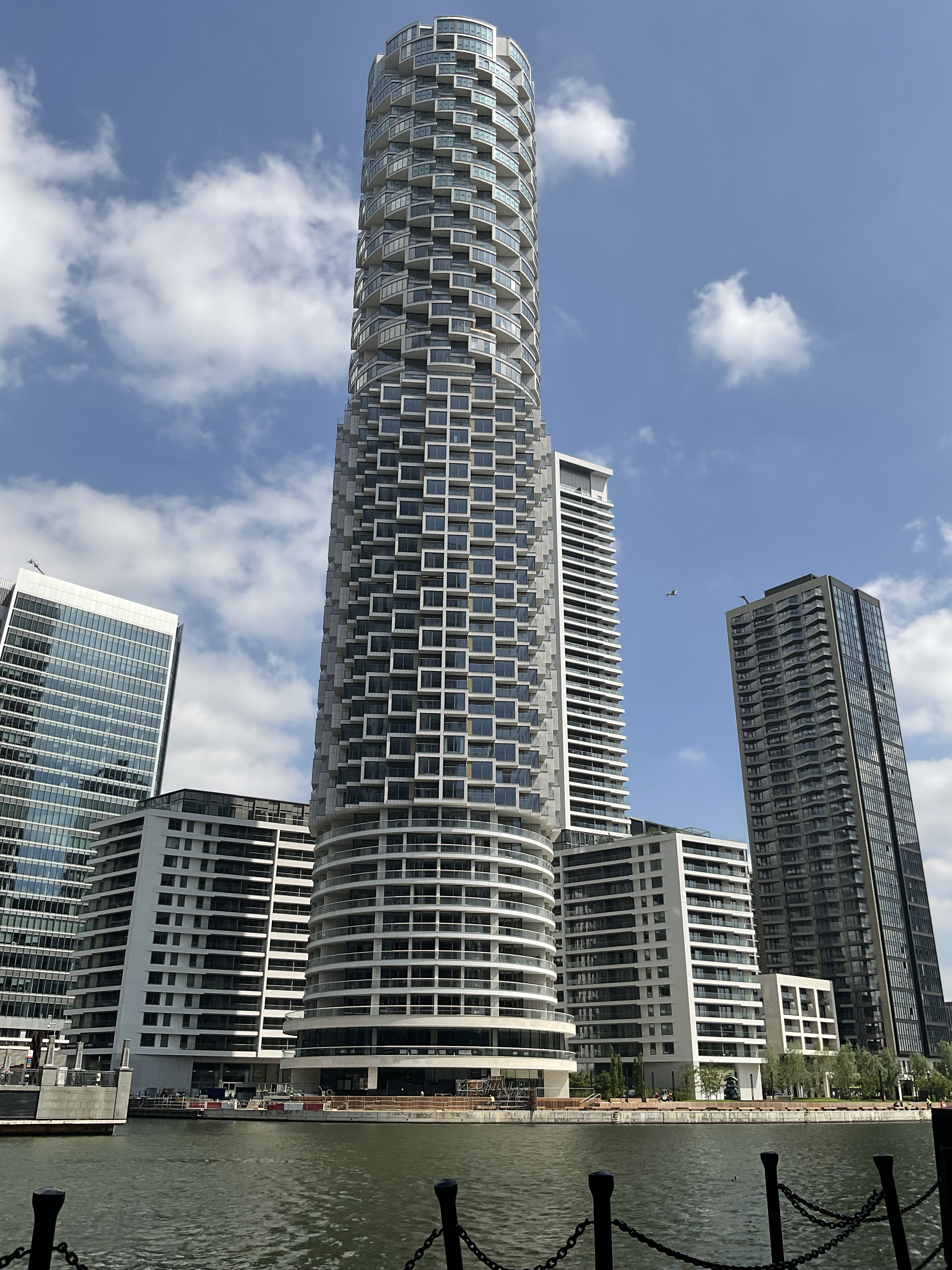
One Park Drive in 2021, one of the first apartment buildings to be completed.

Canary Wharf Group adjusted their strategy for the site to shift some emphasis from office developments to residential. Initially Terry Farrell replaced Rogers Stirk Harbour + Partners in leading the masterplanning, and Herzog & de Meuron, Allies and Morrison and Stanton Williams were appointed as architects for various elements of the scheme. Eventually, Allies and Morrison produced the final masterplan, with Adamson Associates as executive architect supported by Darling Associates, KPF, Herzog & de Meuron, Pilbrow & Partners, Stanton Williams Architects, Grid Architects, and Patel Taylor.

The new masterplan included 30 buildings, comprising 4.9 million square feet of homes, offices and shops.

Tower Hamlets council granted planning permission in July 2014, and the scheme was approved by the Mayor of London in December. Permission required that around 25% of the new homes be affordable homes, and created a review mechanism to increase this allocation to around 40%.

=== Construction ===
Work on the Wood Wharf site was expected to start in autumn 2014, with the first buildings to be occupied at the end of 2018. It was initially estimated to be completed in 2023. A loan of £535 million was secured for the construction Wood Wharf Phase 3. Construction of the third phase has begun with completion of Phase 3 expected in Q1 2027.

== Reception ==
The development of Wood Wharf won the Property Week Placemaking Award in 2022, and a silver award in the Best Mixed-use Development category in 2023 WhatHouse? Awards.

== Buildings ==
Buildings in the Wood Wharf development
| Name | Floors | Residential units | Completion | Use | Architects | Image |
|---|---|---|---|---|---|---|
| One Park Drive | 57 | 484 | 2022 | Residential (private sale) | Adamson Associates; Herzog & de Meuron | |
| 40 Charter Street | 53 | 552 | 2027 (expected) | Residential (market rent) | Kohn Pedersen Fox | |
| 50–60 Charter Street | 49 | 756 | 2025 (expected) | Residential (market rent) | GRID | |
| 7 Brannan Street | 46 | 912 | TBA | Residential (student rent) | Howells | |
| 10 Park Drive | 42 | 345 | 2020 | Residential (private sale) | Stanton Williams | |
| 10 George Street | 37 | 327 | 2020 | Residential (market rent) | GRID | |
| 70 Charter Street | 29 | | 2027 (expected) | Residential (discount market rent) | Darling Associates | |
| 30 Harbord Square | 27 | 176 | 2021 | Residential (discount market rent) | Allies & Morrison | |
| One Charter Street | 20 | 279 | 2024 | Aparthotel | HTA | |
| 15 Water Street | 14 | N/A | 2021 | Offices; Hotel | | |
| 20 Water Street | 14 | N/A | 2021 | Offices; Ground floor retail | | |
| 8 Water Street | 13 | 174 | 2020 | Residential (market rent); Ground floor retail | Stanton Williams; JRA | |
| 3 and 15 West Lane | 13 | 297 | 2025 | Aparthotel | HTA | |
| 8 Harbord Square | 12 | 82 | 2024 | Residential (private sale) | Karakusevic Carson | |
| 50 Harbord Square | 12 | 76 | 2021 | Residential (social rent); Retail and community facilities | Patel Taylor | |
| 65 Harbord Square | 11 | 67 | 2021 | Residential (social rent); Retail and community facilities | Patel Taylor | |
| 13 Brannan Street | 9 | 72 | 2027 (expected) | Residential (affordable); Retail and community facilities | Darling Associates | |
| 20 Brannan Street | 4 | N/A | 2022 | Primary School | | |

== See also ==
- Jamestown Harbour
