= 3D Repo =

British Building Information Modeling (BIM) firm

3D Repo Ltd
- Type: Privately held company
- Industry: Software
- Founded: April 28, 2014
- Headquarters: London, United Kingdom
- Key people: John Davis (Chairman); Dr Jozef Doboš (CEO)
- Website: 3drepo.org

3D Repo Ltd is a software as a service platform provider of building information modeling (BIM) solutions.

The company was founded in 2014 by Jozef Doboš as a spin-off from his Engineering Doctorate in Virtual Environments, Imaging and Visualisation at University College London. The research titled Management and Visualisation of Non-linear History of Polygonal 3D Models was supervised by Prof Anthony Steed and Prof Niloy Mitra, and funded by EPSRC and Arup Foresight. Over the years, 3D Repo won a large number of awards and was involved in many high-profile public as well as private construction projects including London Olympic Stadium, Wood Wharf, Crossrail and Smart Motorways. 3D Repo also provides R&D and VR capability to large construction companies such as Balfour Beatty and Skanska. The lead investor behind the company is an early stage venture capital fund Sussex Place Ventures owned by London Business School. 3D Repo is an organizational member of British Computer Society, the Chartered Institute for IT. In 2015, 3D Repo was named one of top 20 tech innovators in the UK.

== History ==
=== Academic research ===
3D Repo version control system—still in its early stages of doctoral research—was originally demonstrated at the joint SIGGRAPH and Web3D conference in Los Angeles, United States in August 2012 featuring the King's Cross Station Redevelopment project by Arup. Later that year, 3D Repo attended an invited lecture at German Research Centre for Artificial Intelligence (DFKI) in Saarbrücken, Germany which led to a collaboration and development of the first REST API for the system. The front-end visualization was programmed in XML3D and was featured at Web3D 2013 in San Sebastián, Spain. The main scientific advancement was the introduction of externalized web 3D resources in various encodings that enabled interactivity and prevented web browsers from becoming unresponsive while loading very large 3D models over the Internet. SIGGRAPH Asia 2012 in Singapore also introduced a native Android application and the very first 3D differencing tool Interactive 3D Diff. Subsequent collaboration with Prof Niloy Mitra at University College London led to the development of a reverse engineering system 3D Timeline presented at Eurographics 2014 in Strasbourg, France. Unlike Interactive 3D Diff which required prior correspondence information, i.e. matching object-level identifiers between revisions, 3D Timeline reverse engineered the relationships and changes between 3D components over multiple revisions without prior correspondence.

=== Commercial development ===
Based on the potential commercial impact of 3D Repo, the project was awarded VEIV Advance Scholarship in order to devise a business plan. This was nominated for the Royal Academy of Engineering ERA Foundation Entrepreneurs Award in December 2013. A commercial company was registered in April 2014 following the award of an Innovate UK Smart grant which also helped to secure initial angel funding. In the second half of 2014, the project was seconded to Balfour Beatty via the Breakthrough Information Technology Exchange programme applying the new technology to the London Olympic Stadium Transformation project. This led to the development and application of Virtual reality for health and safety training on the M5 Smart Motorway in the UK which was nominated for British Construction Industry Awards in 2017.

In 2015, 3D Repo was also invited to join the third cohort of Cognicity Challenge by Canary Wharf Group. The challenge consisted of an intensive twelve-week incubation programme designed to identify and solve construction problems faced by Canary Wharf in collaboration with Intel. The resulting Building Information Modeling platform 3drepo.io won the Virtual Design and Construction category, a £50,000 cash prize and a paid pilot deploying the solution to the Wood Wharf development. This enabled design coordination and federation of large 3D models via modern WebGL-enabled web browsers. The inner workings of the platform utilizing the X3DOM renderer developed in collaboration with Fraunhofer Institute were presented at the 20th anniversary Web3D conference in Heraklion, Greece. The platform was subsequently expanded with experimental streaming capability using glTF data format developed in collaboration with University College London. Further advanced cloud security provisions were developed in collaboration with British Telecom

In 2017, 3D Repo unveiled version 2.0 based on the Unity game engine. This technological interconnection received the Best Paper Award at Web3D 2017 in Brisbane, Australia. The company has been involved in several research projects aimed at pushing the boundaries of Open BIM, an open-source approach to BIM. One of these projects, called "AEC Delta Mobility," was funded by Innovate UK and aimed to increase the productivity of construction projects by over 15%. Another project, in partnership with eviFile, offered a combined mobile digital evidence and BIM solution. In early 2021, the company launched 3D Send, a platform for secure sharing of BIM outputs. 3D Repo also collaborated with Epic Games to create a data delivery platform using Unreal Engine, which allows users to share massive 3D engineering models online.

In April 2023, 3D Repo was acquired by Asite, a leading construction collaboration technology developer for an undisclosed sum with the aim to "provide customers with even more advanced solutions for managing their construction projects and help drive digitisation in construction to the next level".
