= Riverside South =

Riverside South can refer to:

== Places ==
- Riverside South, Ottawa, a suburban neighbourhood
- Riverside South (New York City), an apartment complex also known as Trump Place
- Riverside South (Canary Wharf), an office development in London, England

== See also ==
- South Riverside, an early name of Corona, California
