= North Quay =

- North Quay, Western Australia, a container handling port in North Fremantle, Western Australia
- North Quay, Brisbane, an area of Brisbane, Australia
  - North Quay ferry wharf, a ferry terminal serving the Brisbane North Quay
- North Quay, London, an office development in Canary Wharf, London
