= One Park Drive =

Residential skyscraper in London

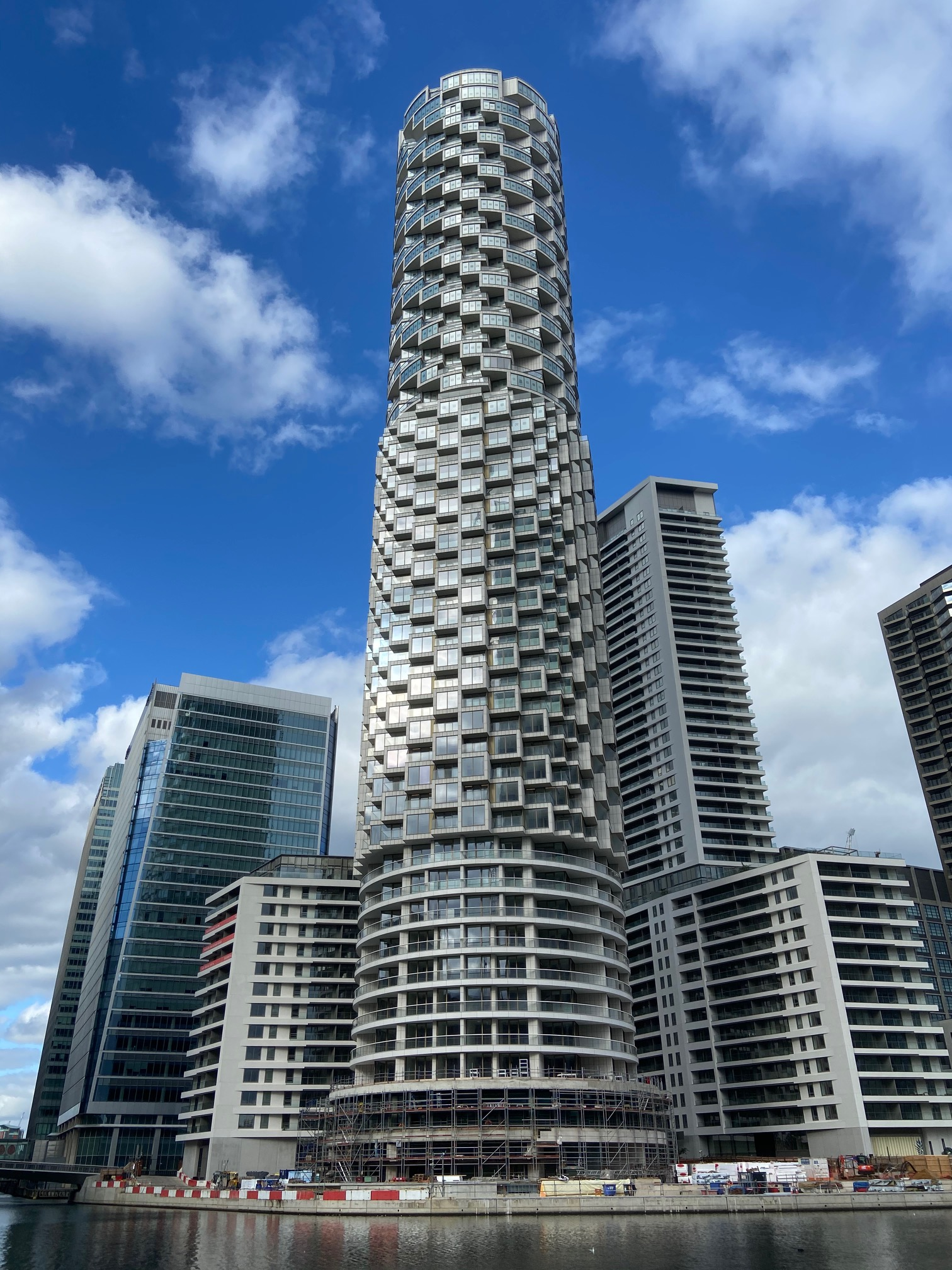
- August 2020
- Interactive map of the One Park Drive area

General information
- Status: Completed
- Type: Residential
- Location: London, E14; United Kingdom, 1 Park Drive, Wood Wharf, Tower Hamlets
- Coordinates: 51.5023°N 0.0151°W
- Construction started: 2016
- Completed: 2021
- Owner: Canary Wharf Group

Height
- Height: 205 m (673 ft)

Technical details
- Floor count: 57
- Floor area: 54,656 m^{2} (588,310 sq ft)

Design and construction
- Architecture firm: Herzog & de Meuron, Adamson Associates (International) Ltd. (as executive architect)
- Structural engineer: AKT II
- Main contractor: Canary Wharf Contractors

One Park Drive is a residential skyscraper situated in the south west corner of Wood Wharf, within the Canary Wharf financial estate on the Isle of Dogs, London.

The building is the first residential development designed by Swiss-based architecture firm Herzog & de Meuron in the United Kingdom. The design of the building has been likened to Goldberg's Marina City in Chicago. It is cylindrical in shape, with 57 storeys comprising 484 private residential apartments and penthouses. The sub-penthouses on floor 55 were launched in September 2022, and the main duplex penthouses on floors 56-57 were launched in October 2022. As of 2023, One Park Drive is the ninth-tallest building in the United Kingdom at 205 m (673 ft) tall.

== Awards and Accreditation ==
One Park Drive has won numerous awards including:

- Two International Property Awards, the Best Apartment and Best Residential Development categories, in 2021.
- Two British Homes Awards, Architect of the Year and Development of the Year, in 2021.
- Two Golds at the WhatHouse? Awards, Awards for Best Exterior Design and Best Luxury Development, in 2021.
- Awarded the title of Best Large Housing Scheme by New London Architecture in 2022.
- The penthouse at One Park Drive was named the Best Apartment at the Evening Standard New Homes Awards, and won gold in the Best Interior Design category at WhatHouse? Awards in 2023.

== Gallery ==
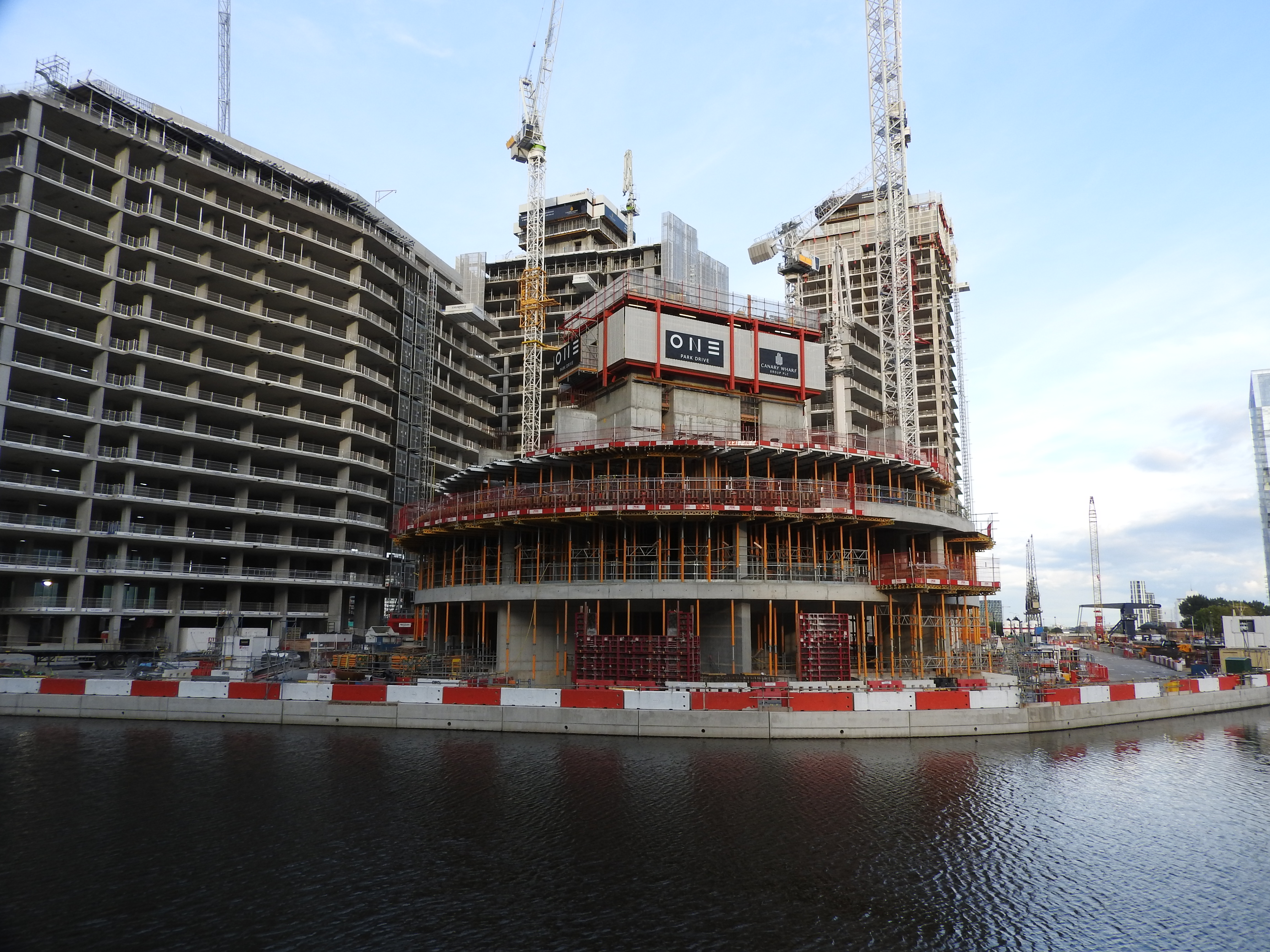
Under construction in September 2017

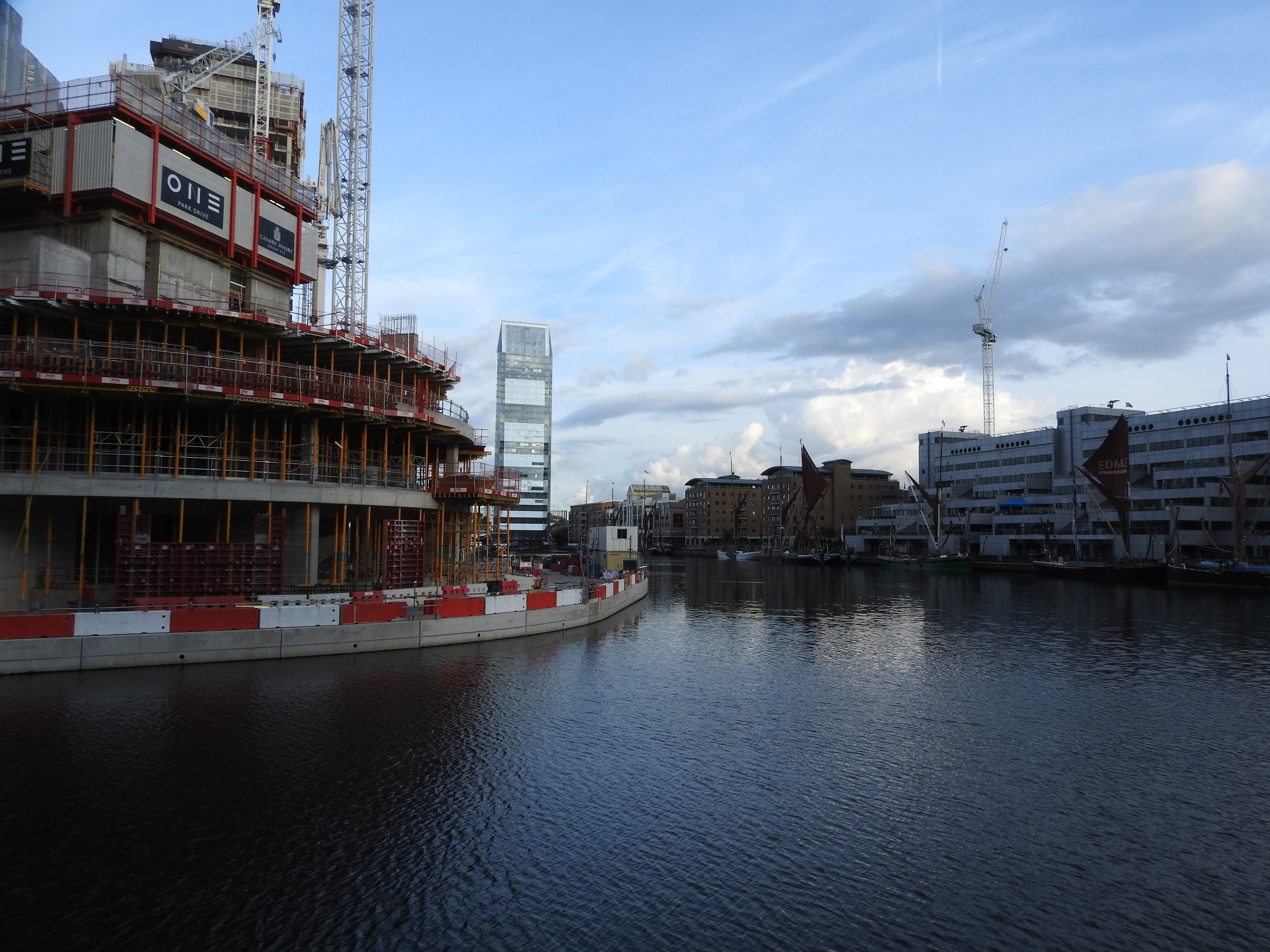
Under construction in September 2017

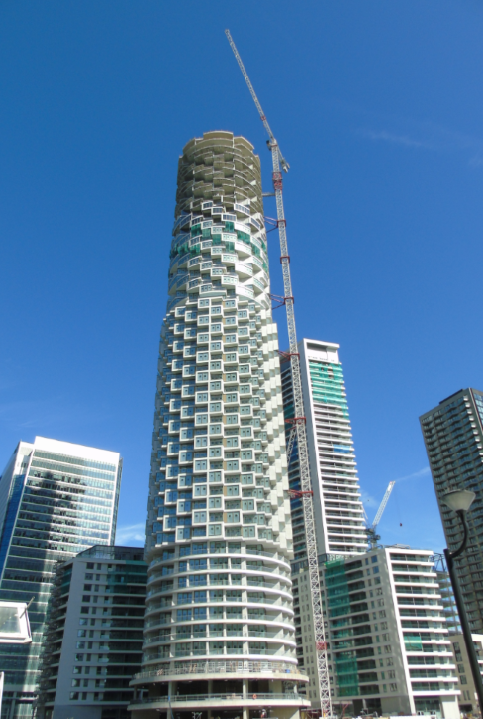
Under construction in 2019

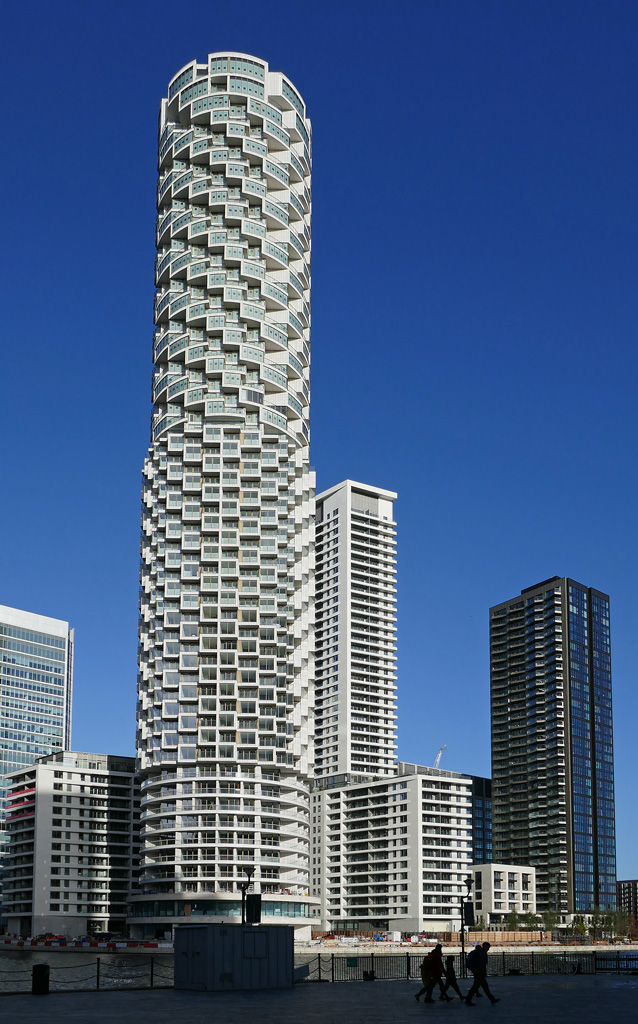
November 2020

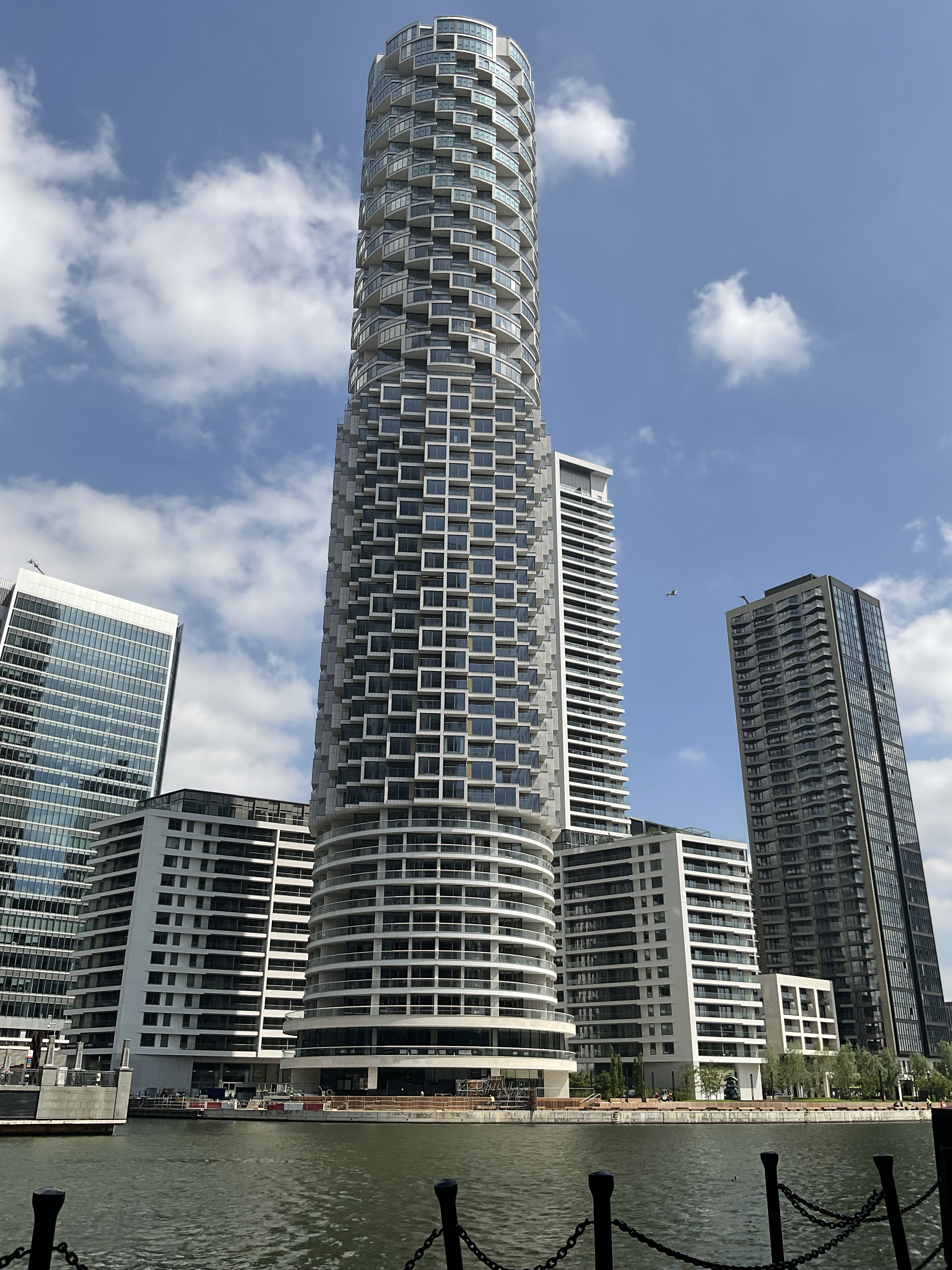
June 2021

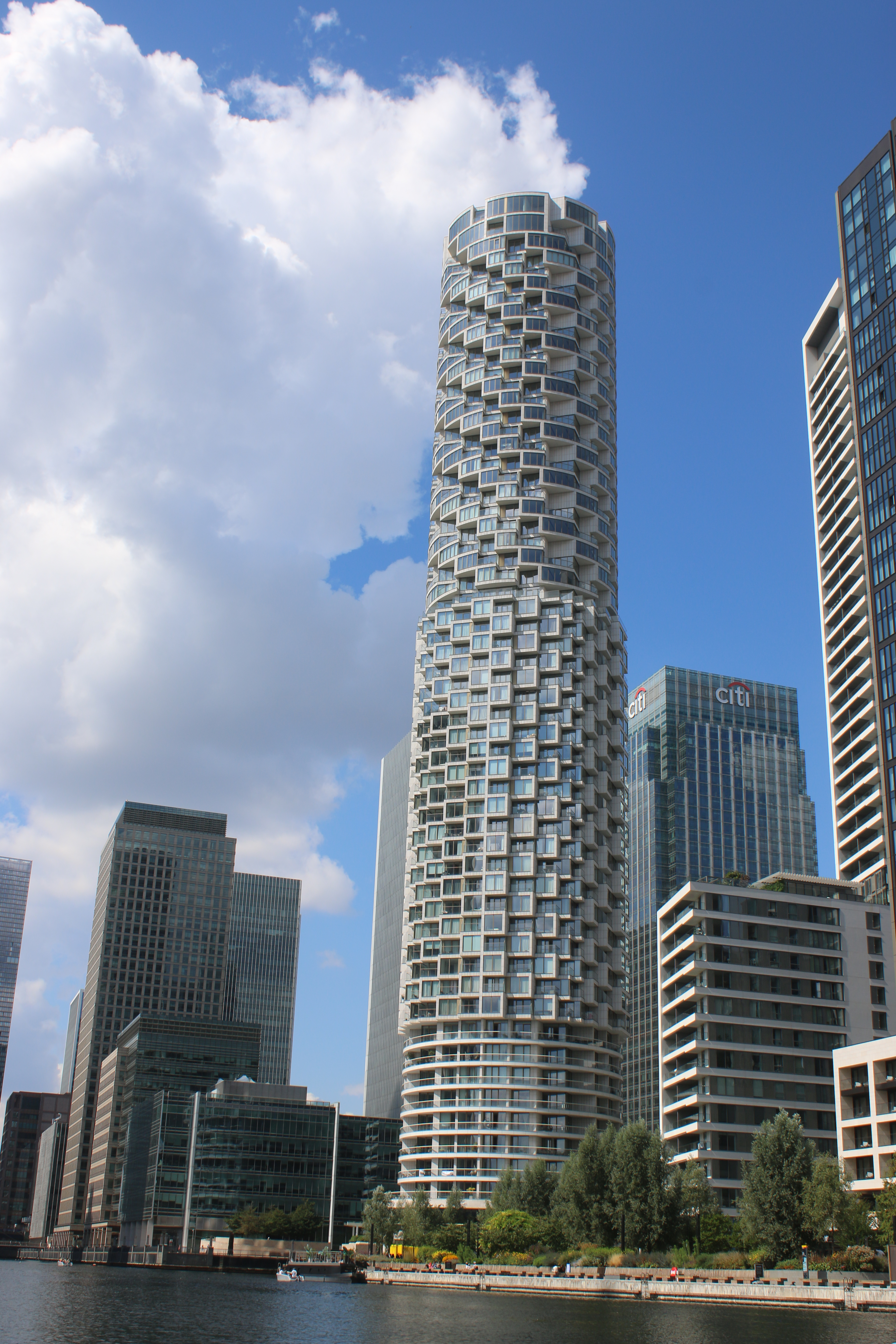
Completed, August 2022

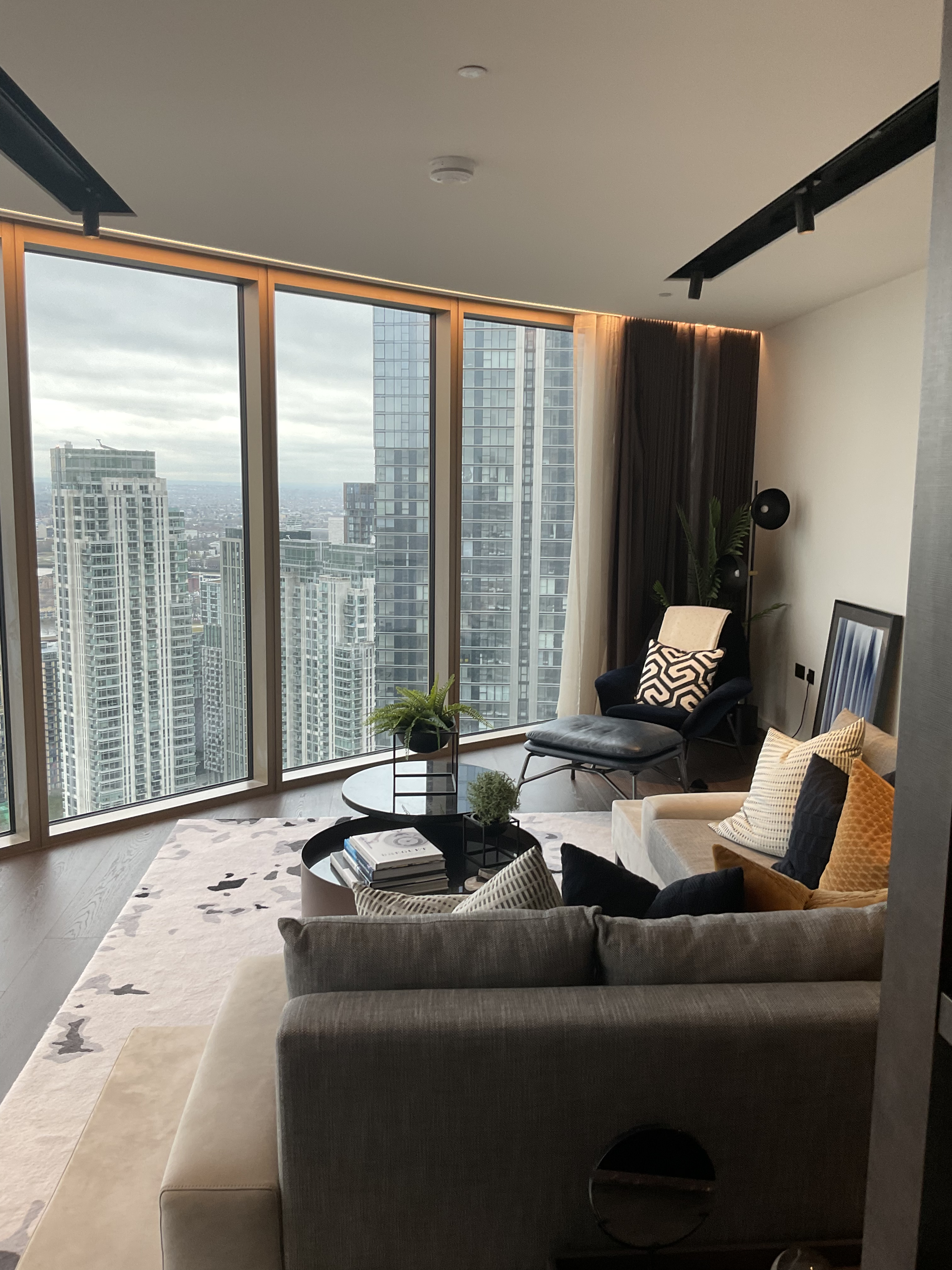
Interior of show apartment

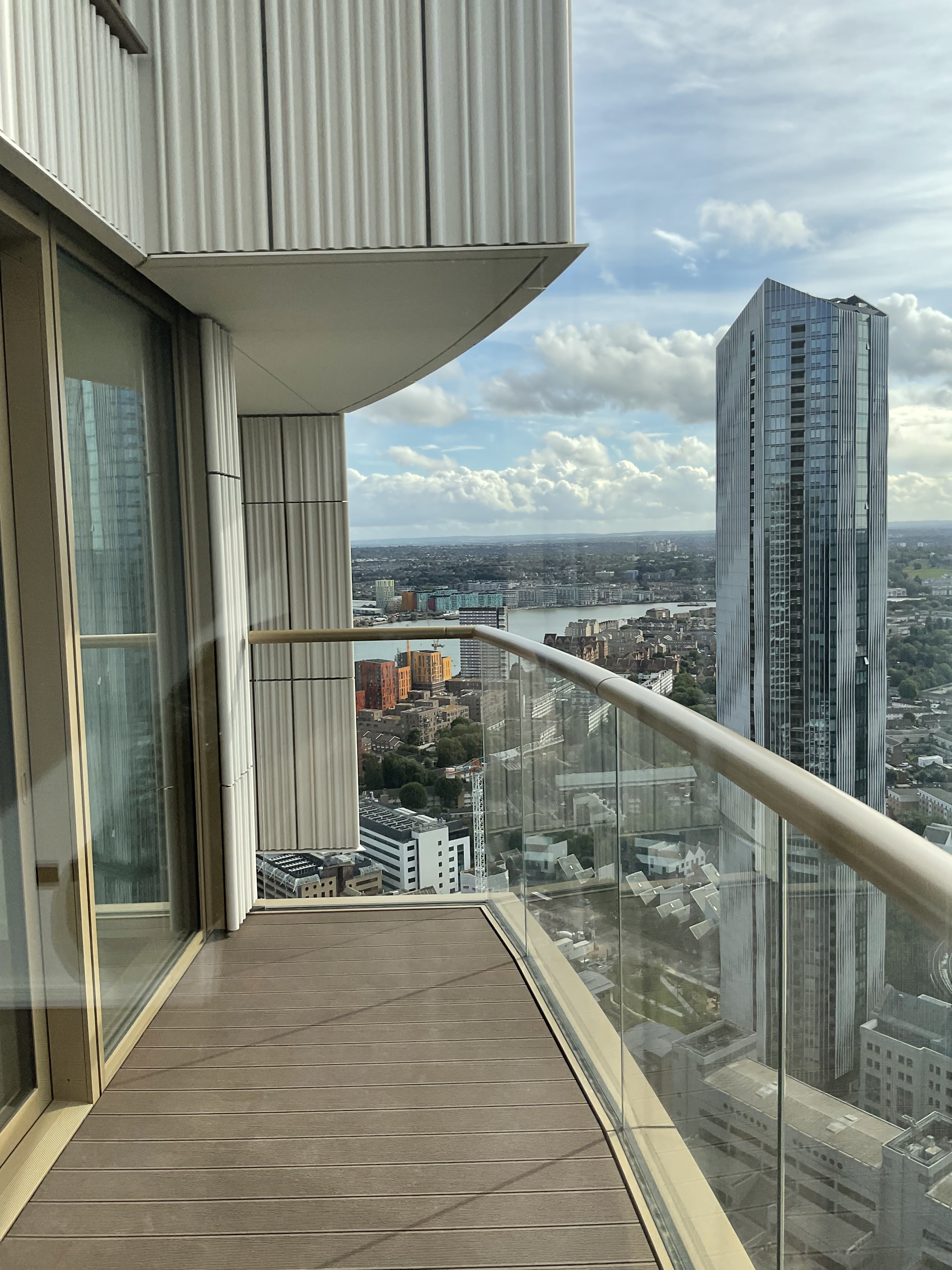
View from apartment balcony

== Planning application ==
- Tower Hamlets reference: PA/15/00018
