= 40 Charter Street =

Skyscraper under construction in London, England

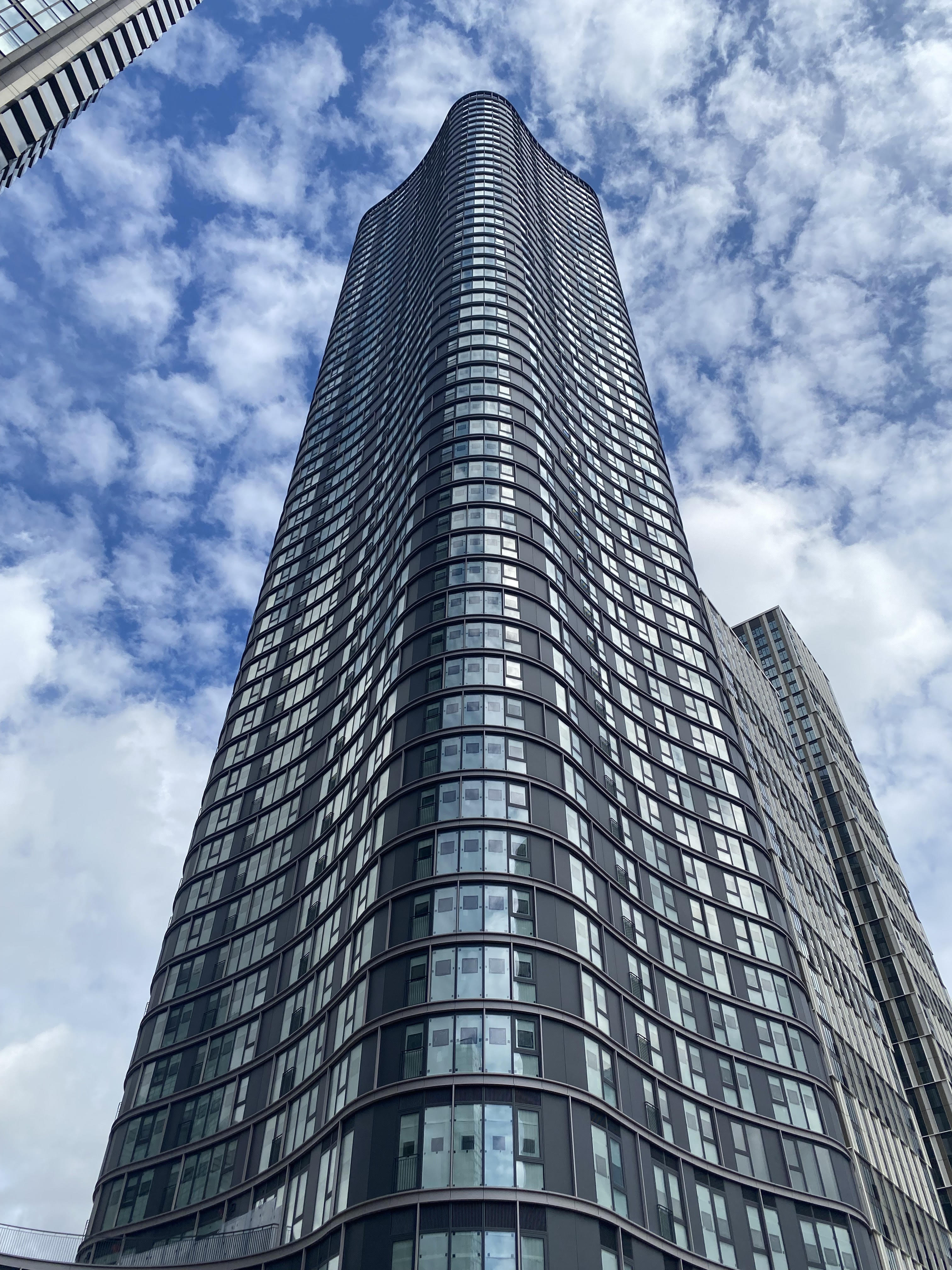
- 40 Charter Street in August 2025
- Interactive map of the 40 Charter Street area
- Alternative names: Wood Wharf E3/E4

General information
- Status: Topped out
- Type: Residential
- Location: London, E14; England, 40 Charter Street, Tower Hamlets
- Coordinates: 51.5019°N 0.0123°W
- Construction started: 2022
- Completed: 2027
- Owner: Canary Wharf Group

Height
- Height: 178.6 m (586 ft)

Technical details
- Floor count: 53
- Floor area: 590,000 ft^{2} (55,000 m^{2})

Design and construction
- Architecture firm: Kohn Pedersen Fox Associates

40 Charter Street is a residential skyscraper under construction within the Wood Wharf development on the Isle of Dogs in London, England.

Part of Phase Three of the larger Wood Wharf masterplan, the building is being developed by the Canary Wharf Group. It was designed by the architecture firm KPF and rises to 178.6 metres (586 ft).

The building was a finalist for the Net Zero Award at the Building Awards 2024, and a finalist at the New London Awards 2023. It has won the Best Digital Transformation Award at the 2025 Building Innovation Awards.

== History ==
=== Planning ===
An original planning application was submitted in 2014, with a tower height of 192 metres (630 ft). An updated application was approved in February 2022.

=== Construction ===
Construction began on the tower in 2022, with Canary Wharf Contractors overseeing the construction. 40 Charter Street has an estimated completion date of February 2027.

== Design ==
The building, designed by KPF, is planned to be a 53-storey tower. It will contain 552 built-to-rent apartments. The architectural design is noted for its undulating facade, which breaks from the more orthogonal grid of the surrounding neighbourhood and provides a dynamic interplay of horizontal and vertical elements. The apartments are designed to prioritise internal amenity space and feature floor-to-ceiling windows and Juliette balconies, offering views of the South Dock and surrounding area.

It is planned to include over 1,500 square metres (16,000 sq ft) of shared amenity space in its podium, including a gym, business centre, and other multi-functional rooms.

== Gallery ==
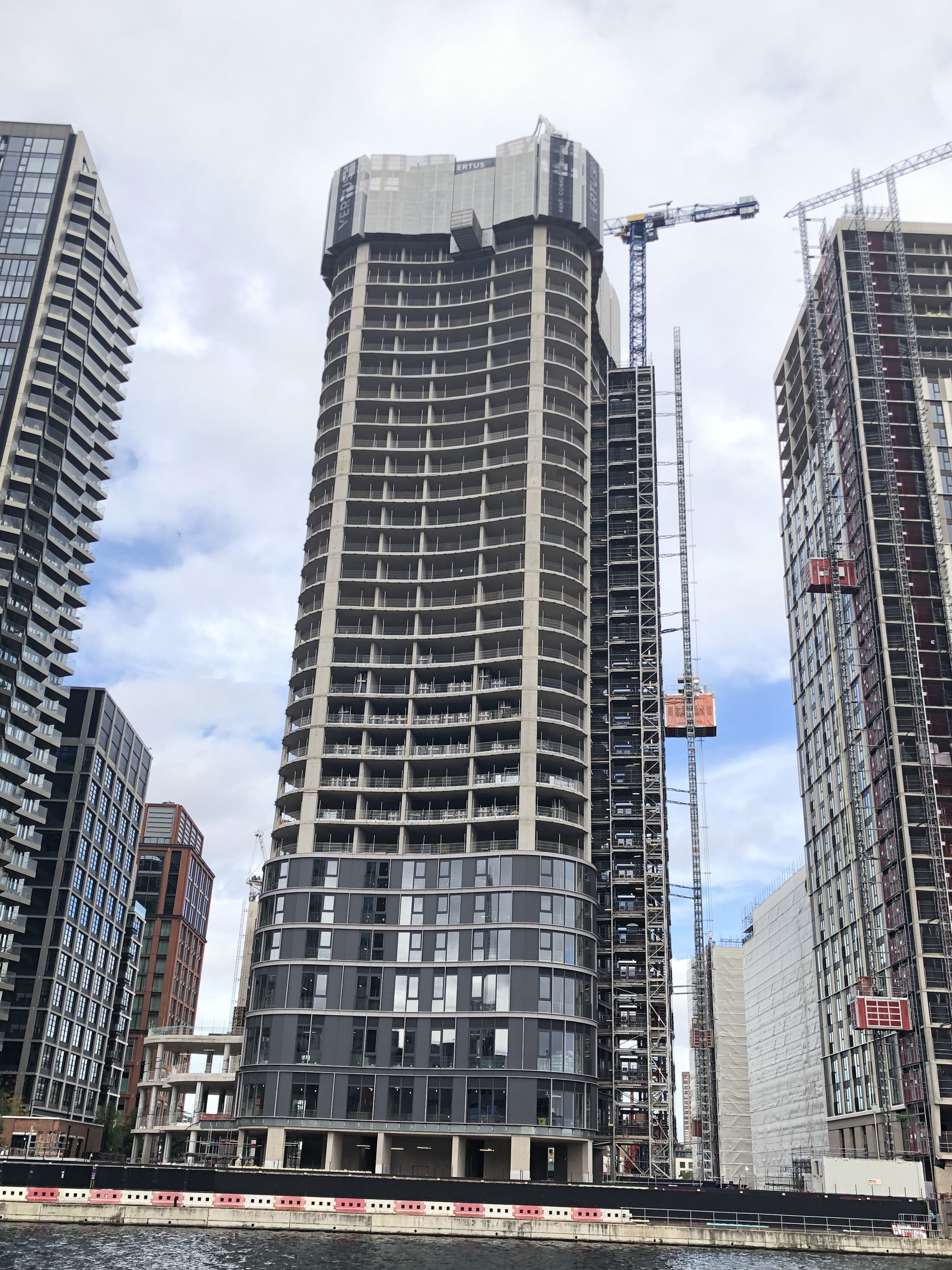
40 Charter Street under construction in October 2023

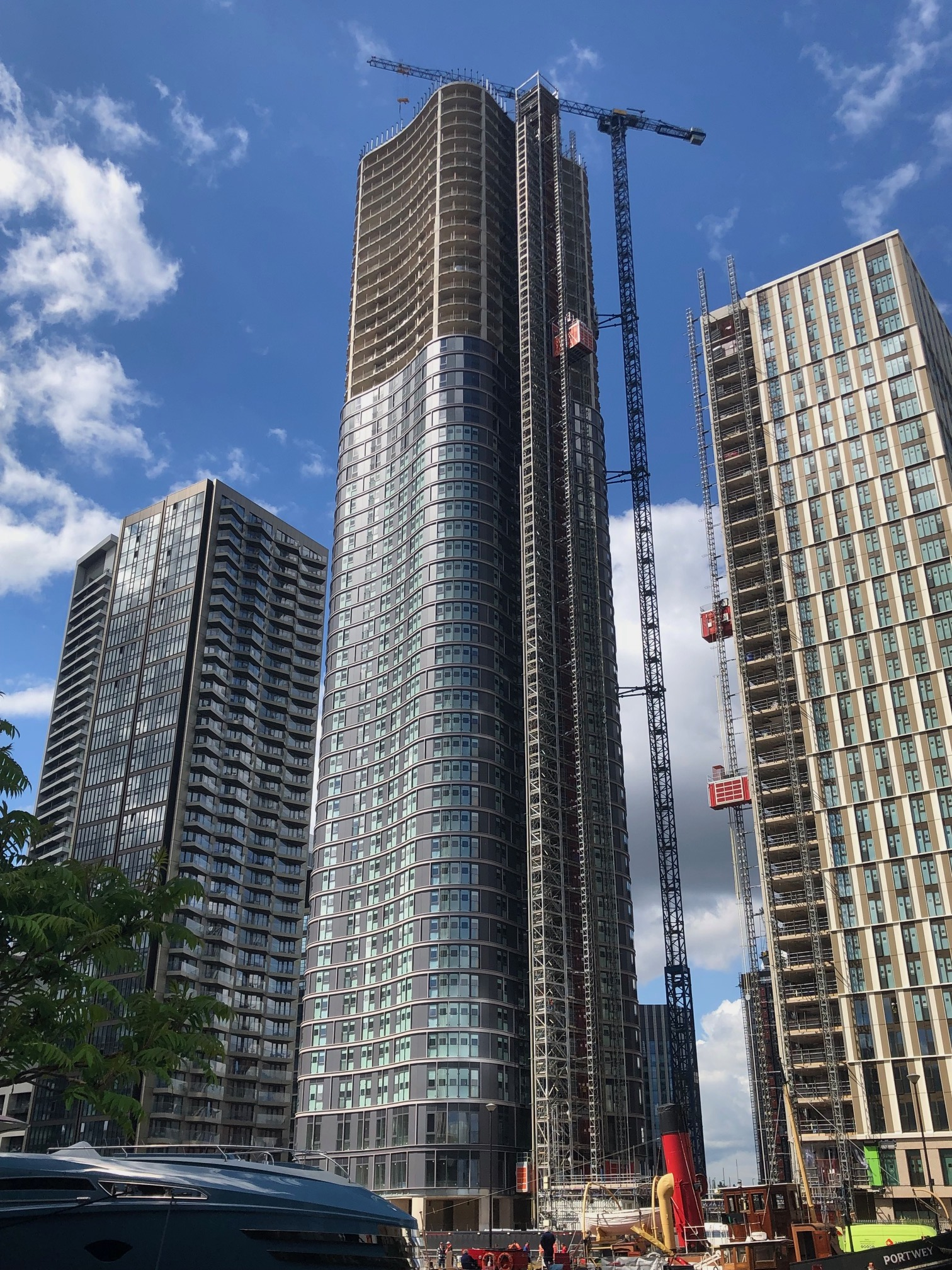
40 Charter Street under construction in May 2024

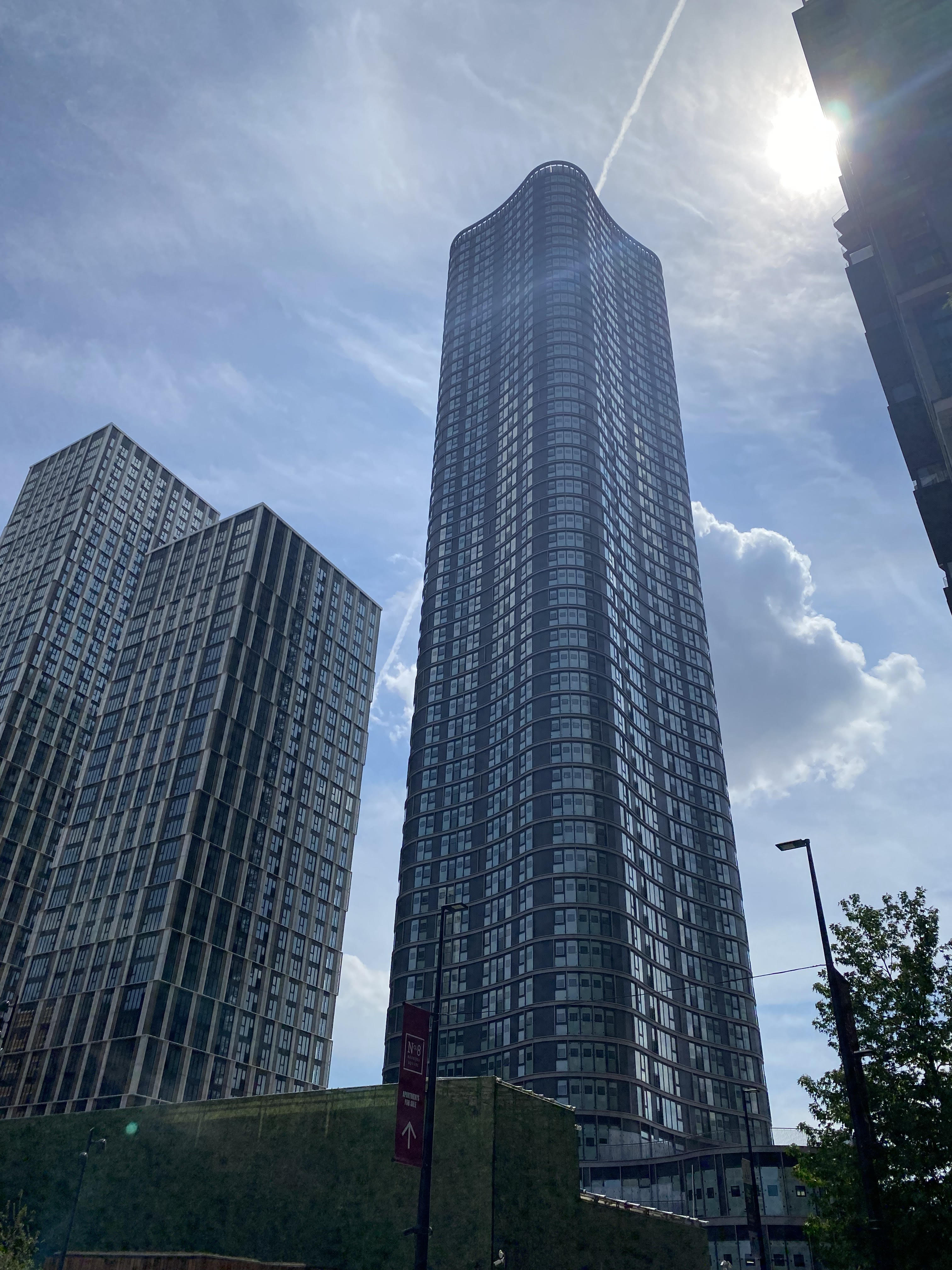
40 Charter Street under construction in May 2025

== See also ==
- List of tallest buildings and structures in London
- List of tallest buildings in the United Kingdom
