= Heron Quays West =

Coordinates: 51.50334°N 0.02307°W

- The previous (2007) approved design for Heron Quays West.
- Interactive map of the Heron Quays West area

General information
- Status: Under construction
- Location: London, E14; United Kingdom
- Construction started: 2016
- Completed: 2019
- Opening: Postponed

Height
- Roof: 214 m (702 ft) (Tower 1); 156 m (512 ft) (Tower 2)

Technical details
- Floor count: 40 (Tower 1); 29 (Tower 2)

Design and construction
- Architect: Rogers Stirk Harbour + Partners
- Developer: Canary Wharf Group

Heron Quays West is a skyscraper development under construction in Canary Wharf, London. The plan is for two large skyscrapers connected by a large atrium at the base, not unlike the Riverside South development. The site is at the south west of the Canary Wharf site off Bank Street. Developers for the project are the Canary Wharf Group.

== History ==
The original design for the site, revealed in 2007, was by Richard Rogers Partnership and featured three adjacent towers.

On 27 April 2007, it was revealed that Canary Wharf Group had surprisingly sent a letter to the local council indicating they intend to stop the leasehold on site, and that they would be starting development at Heron Quay on or before August 2008. This means the development will start years before previously expected, and that North Quay will be constructed after this scheme instead of before it.

In March 2008, the Borough of Tower Hamlets approved the Heron Quays West scheme, and on 7 May 2009, Tower Hamlets issued a compulsory purchase order for the land needed to proceed with development.

An updated design was proposed in 2013–14. The updated plan features two towers known as "Heron Quays West 1" (10 Bank Street) and "Heron Quays West 2" (1 Bank Street). Tower one has 40 floors and a height of 214 metres, and tower two has 29 floors and a height of 156 metres. The two towers are joined by a common base. Of these, Heron Quays West 1 received outline planning approval in 2013, and is proceeding to detailed design. Demolition and alteration of landscaping began in early 2014.

Construction was originally considered unlikely to commence until Riverside South and North Quay were complete. Riverside South is now in indefinite suspension, however, the North Quay development is under construction.

== See also ==
- Canary Wharf
- Riverside South
- North Quay, London
- One Canada Square
- HSBC Tower, London
- Tall buildings in London
- London Bridge Tower
- Bishopsgate Tower
