= Riverside South (Canary Wharf) =

Proposed building in London

- Artist's impression of the original proposal
- Interactive map of the Riverside South area

General information
- Status: Proposed
- Location: Canary Wharf; London, E14; United Kingdom
- Coordinates: 51°30′14.8″N 0°1′35.7″W
- Owner: JP Morgan Chase

Height
- Roof: 236.64 metres (776 ft) 185.84 metres (610 ft)

Technical details
- Floor count: 45 and 37
- Floor area: 279,075 m^{2} (3,000,000 sq ft)(Gross); 165,727 m^{2} (1,780,000 sq ft)(Net Lettable)

Design and construction
- Architect: Rogers Stirk Harbour + Partners
- Developer: JP Morgan Chase
- Structural engineer: Halcrow Yolles
- Main contractor: Canary Wharf Contractors

Riverside South is a proposed skyscraper development in Canary Wharf, London. Some below ground-level work was completed by 2014 on behalf of investment bank J.P. Morgan & Co., which bought a 999-year lease on the site with the intention of making the building its London office, but the firm moved into an existing Canary Wharf building and the site remained dormant into the 2020s. Plans to continue construction at the site were announced in November 2025.

== Planning ==
The development is being planned by J.P. Morgan & Co., which purchased a 999-year lease on the site from Canary Wharf Group in November 2008. It will be located on the western side of the Isle of Dogs, immediately south of Westferry Circus on the bank of the River Thames. This is one of the few sites left in the Docklands area which has been identified as suitable for the construction of skyscrapers.

The original proposal consisted of two buildings of 214 metres (702 ft) and 189 metres (620 ft), designed by the Richard Rogers Partnership. These were approved in the summer of 2004.

In April 2007, Canary Wharf Group submitted a new planning application to increase the size of the scheme by 36,420 m^{2} (392,000 sq ft) to 327,255 m^{2} (3,522,540 sq ft). The application confirmed work was underway on site. Tower 1 of the scheme was increased from 214 metres (702 ft) to 235.64 metres (773 ft), while Tower 2 was reduced from 189 metres (620 ft) to 185.84 metres (610 ft). The middle building adjoining the towers was increased from 47 metres (154 ft) to 72 metres (236 ft). The new design was granted planning permission by the London Borough of Tower Hamlets on 21 June 2007. A further minor revision was submitted for approval in October 2008, which would reduce the height of the middle building by 9 m (30 ft).

The taller tower could become the tallest building in Canary Wharf, exceeding One Canada Square by a metre (on an AGL basis; One Canada Square is higher AOD, so will still appear taller on the skyline).

In 2015, JP Morgan put plans to sell the site on hold to reconsider whether the land should be retained for a new European HQ in anticipation of the bank’s future growth in London (perhaps in partnership with another a joint venture anchor tenant).

In November 2025, J.P. Morgan Chase announced plans to recommence work on the site, with a new design by Foster + Partners. With Canary Wharf Group acting as co-developer, construction is expected to take around six years.

== Construction ==
In early 2007, JPMorgan considered the development as an option for their new London premises, which would involve relocating from their various City of London offices. The company initially decided to remain in the City, but in August 2008, the company announced that it had signed heads of terms to move to Riverside South, and in November 2008 JP Morgan signed an agreement to purchase a 999-year lease on the site for £237 million.

Canary Wharf Contractors Limited were contracted to construct the basement structure up to ground level. Work on the basement slab for Tower 1 began in July 2009, with concrete being poured for the basements. Two crane bases appeared on site in September 2009, but work ceased in 2010. In December 2010, JP Morgan said that it would be moving its London staff into 25 Bank Street, a smaller building on the Canary Wharf estate that was once the London office of the collapsed investment bank Lehman Brothers. In April 2011, JP Morgan announced their intention to complete the building up to street level with work due to start in October 2011, and work on the basement levels was completed.

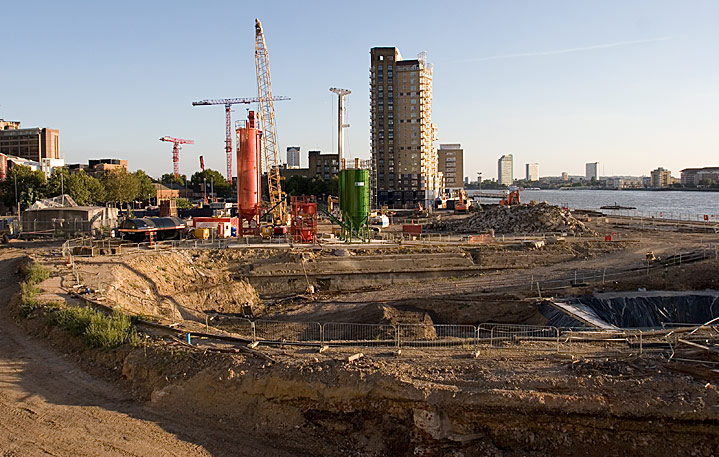
Ground work under way, September 2007

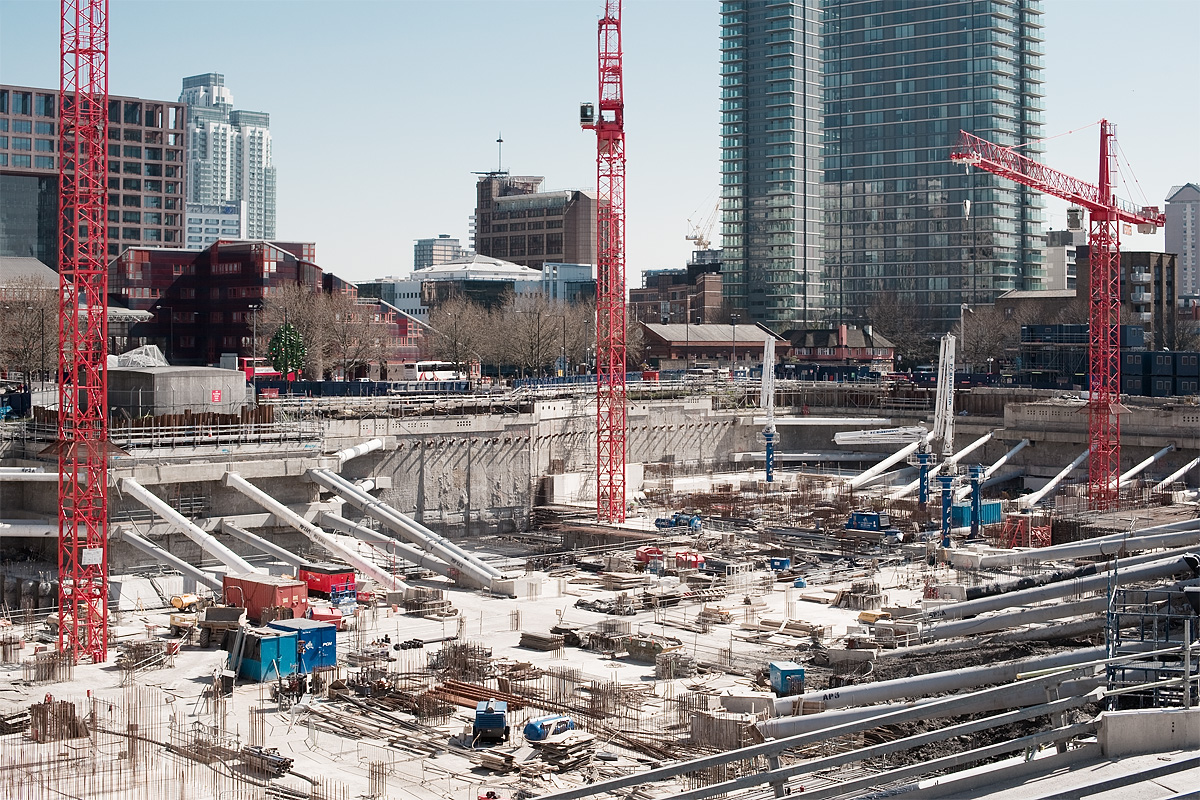
Construction as of March 2010

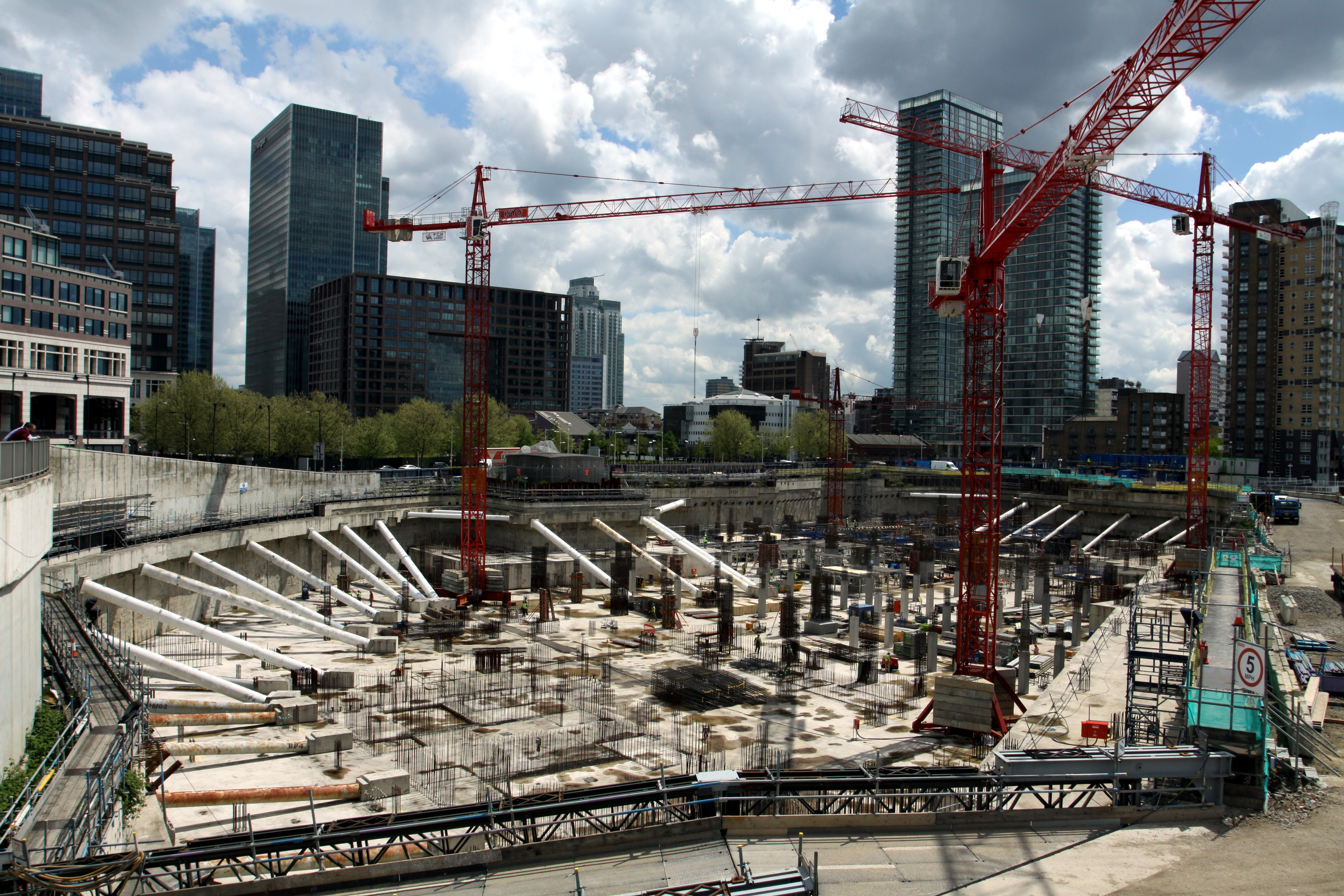
Construction of Riverside South, May 2013

== See also ==
- Canary Wharf
- Isle of Dogs
