= North Quay, London =

Office development in London, England

Coordinates: 51°30′25.19″N 0°1′7.28″W

North Quay
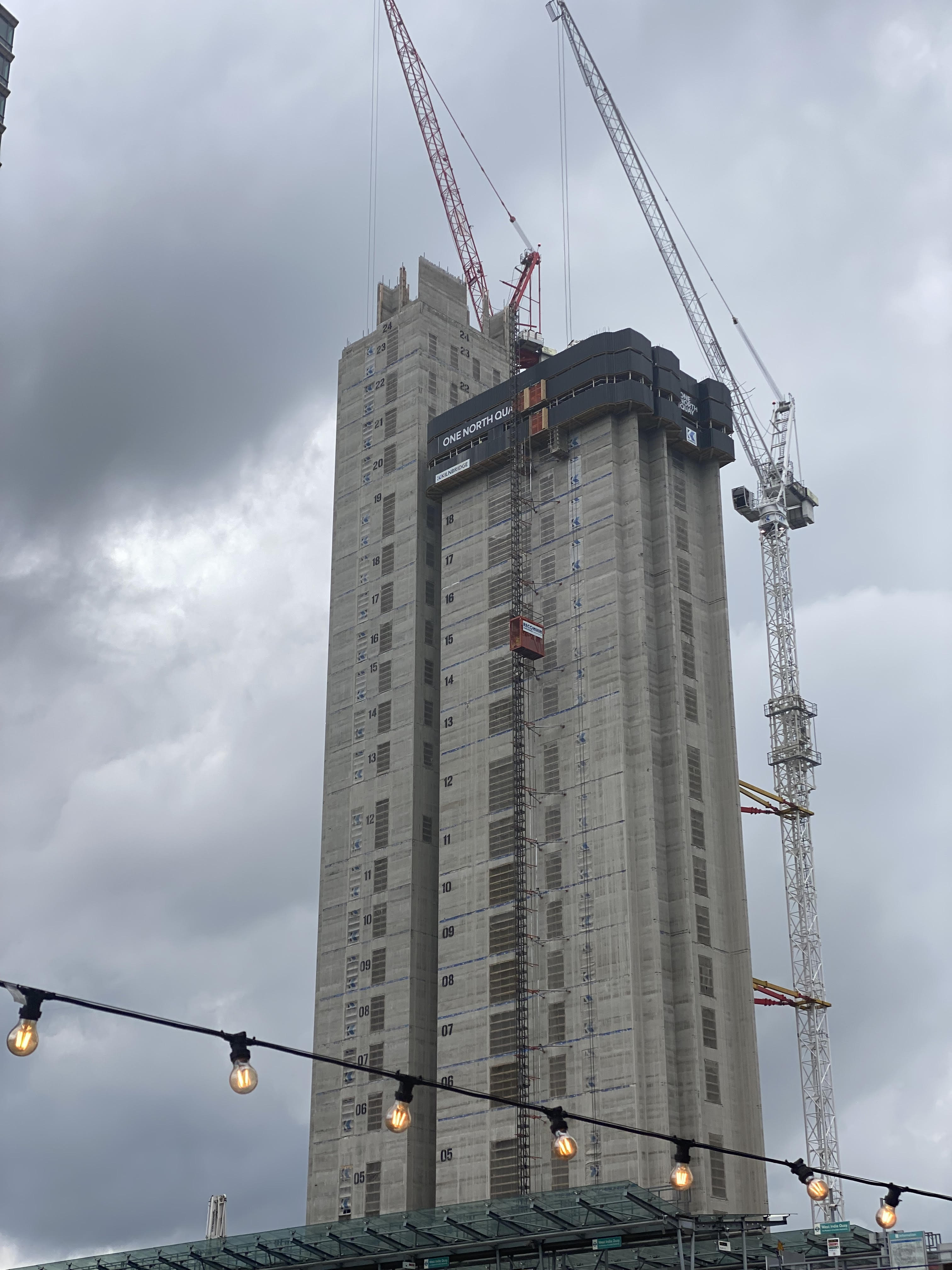
- One North Quay under construction in July 2025

General information
- Status: Under construction
- Location: London, E14; United Kingdom
- Construction started: 24 September 2024
- Owner: Canary Wharf Group

Technical details
- Floor area: Offices: 372,660 square metres (4,011,300 sq ft); Other: 5,324 square metres (57,300 sq ft)

Design and construction
- Architects: Allies and Morrison

North Quay is a mixed-use high-rise development under construction on the north side of Canary Wharf in the London Borough of Tower Hamlets. The development consists of four towers of 30 to 67 floors located on the northern quayside of the North Dock of West India Docks, immediately east of West India Quay DLR station. The developer is Canary Wharf Group and the masterplan was produced by Allies and Morrison. The development will create 355,000 square metres (3,820,000 sq ft) of floorspace intended for use as offices, life sciences laboratories, retail, leisure and residential units.

"North Quay" has also been used as the name for the entire quayside, the length of North Dock, which also includes London Museum Docklands and Billingsgate Fish Market.

== History ==
Before redevelopment, the vacant plot known as "Shed 35" was used as an open-air car park managed by Britannia Parking until June 2006. It was then occupied by construction equipment for Canary Wharf Crossrail station, which was built in the adjacent West India North Dock.

=== Planning ===
Artist's impression of the three towers originally approved for North Quay

Plans to redevelop the site were first put forward in 2003. The original plans were for two towers and a central link building, designed by architect Cesar Pelli. The two skyscrapers were planned to be 209 m (686 ft) and 221 m (725 ft) high, with a third tower at 120 m (390 ft). These would have had 18, 38 and 40 floors for use as offices. Norquil Ltd (a subsidiary of Canary Wharf Group) submitted a planning application in March 2003, and received approval from Tower Hamlets Council in January 2007, with a condition that the development shall commence by January 2017. Implementation of these plans was delayed by the use of the site during Crossrail construction, during which time the 2008 financial crisis changed demand for office space in London, and with that Canary Wharf's development priorities.

In 2017, a new masterplan was developed by Allies and Morrison, now consisting of four towers of 30 to 67 floors. Consultation with local stakeholders and the public was held between October 2019 and March 2020, and planning permission was granted in March 2022. "Reserved matters" for North Quay development first tower were approved in July 2023. Compared to the original proposal, the new masterplan reduces the emphasis on large-floorplate offices designed for large companies, with more flexible spaces which could have a variety of uses, including life-sciences laboratories or residential.

=== Construction ===
Construction began on 24 September 2024, with intended completion in 2027.

== Gallery ==
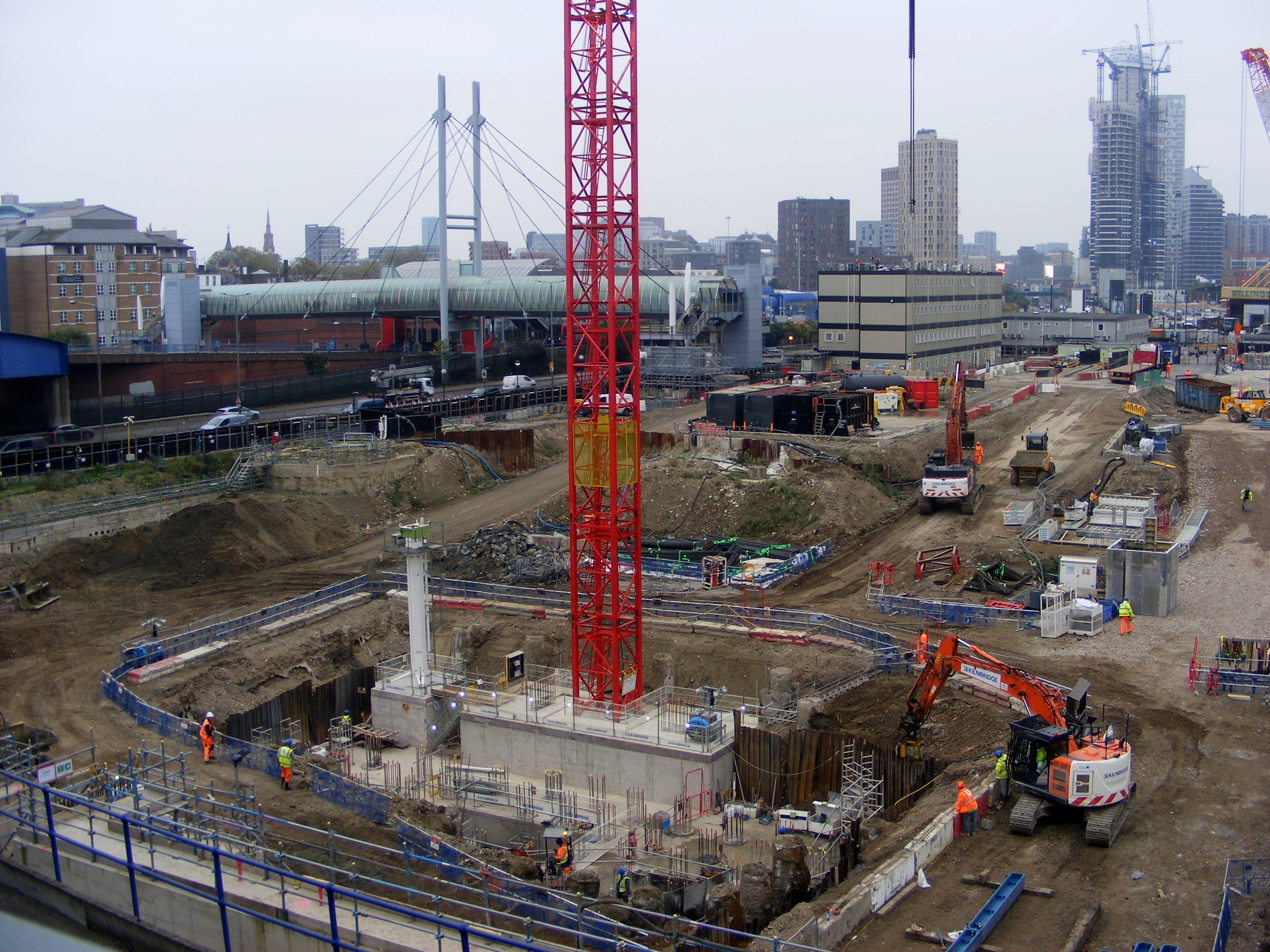
Construction in November 2024

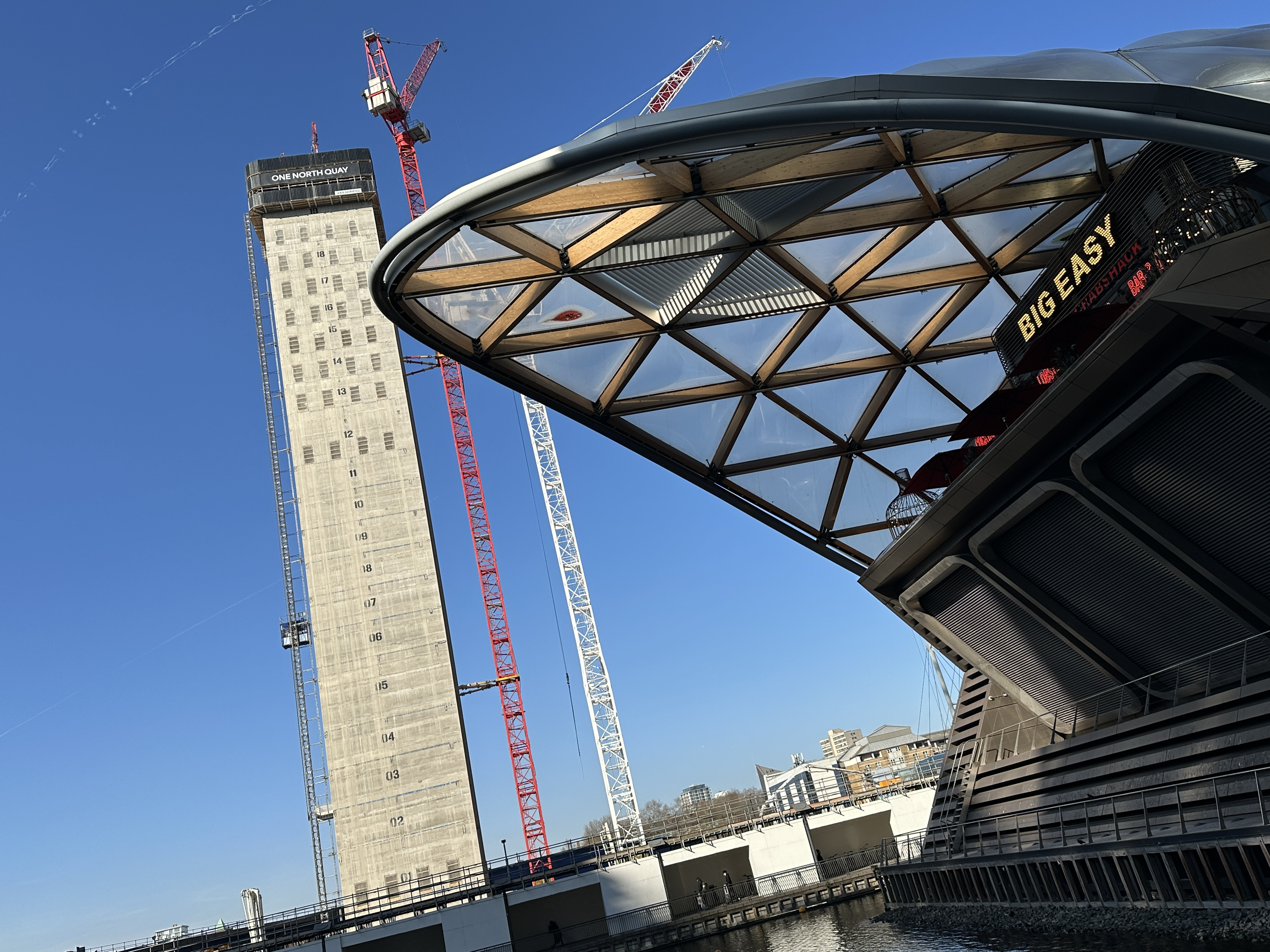
Construction in March 2025

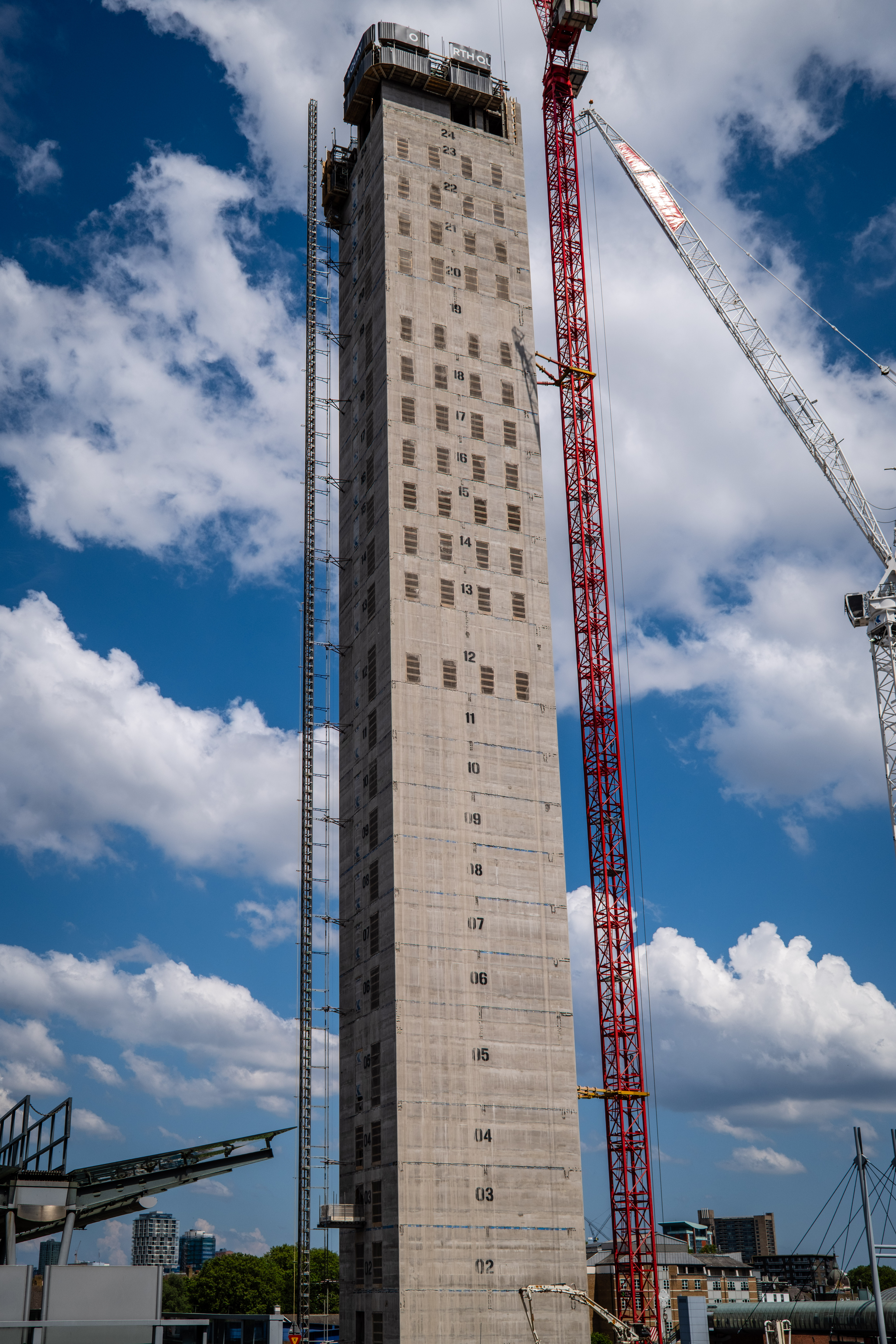
Construction in May 2025

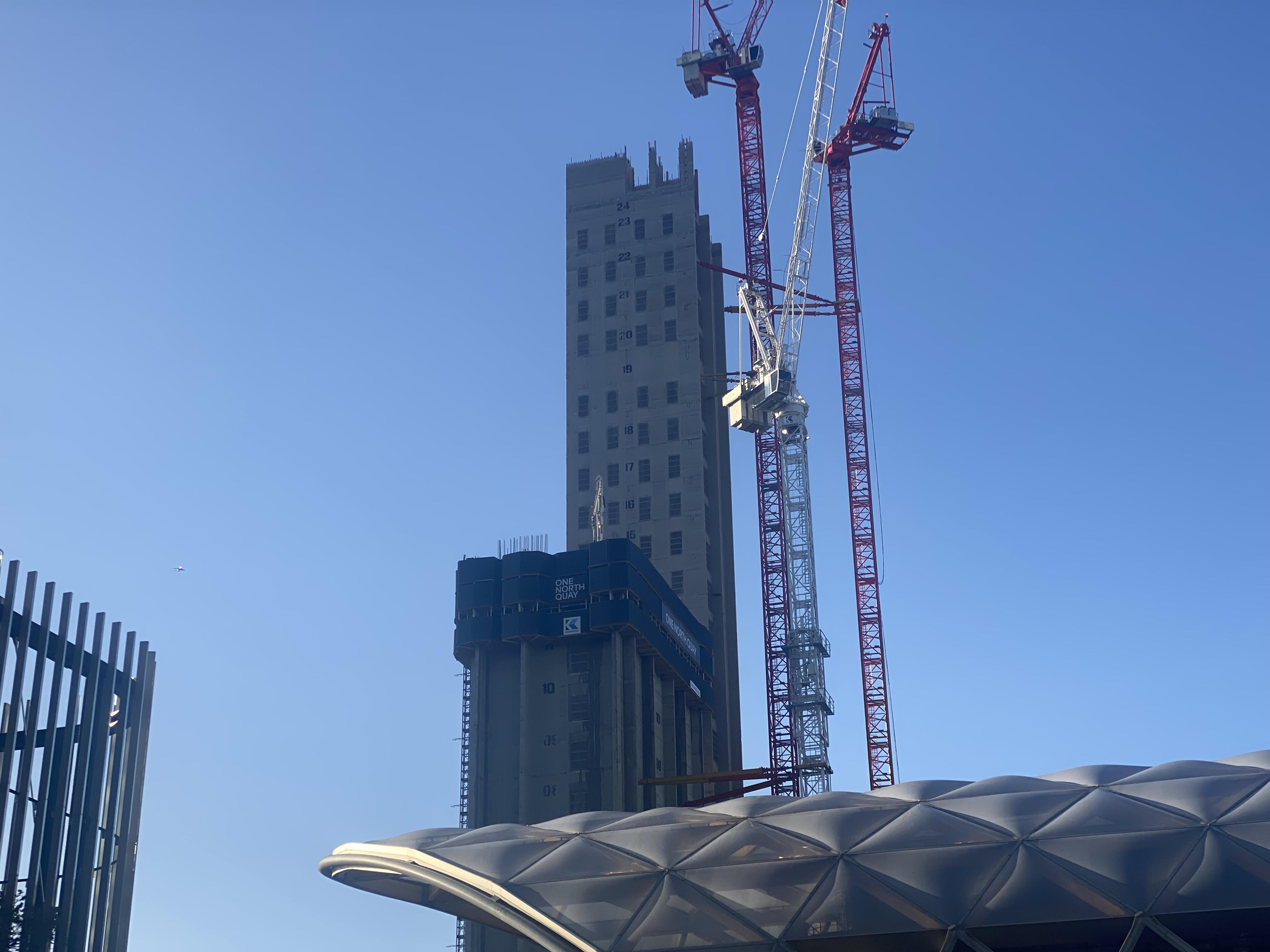
Construction in July 2025

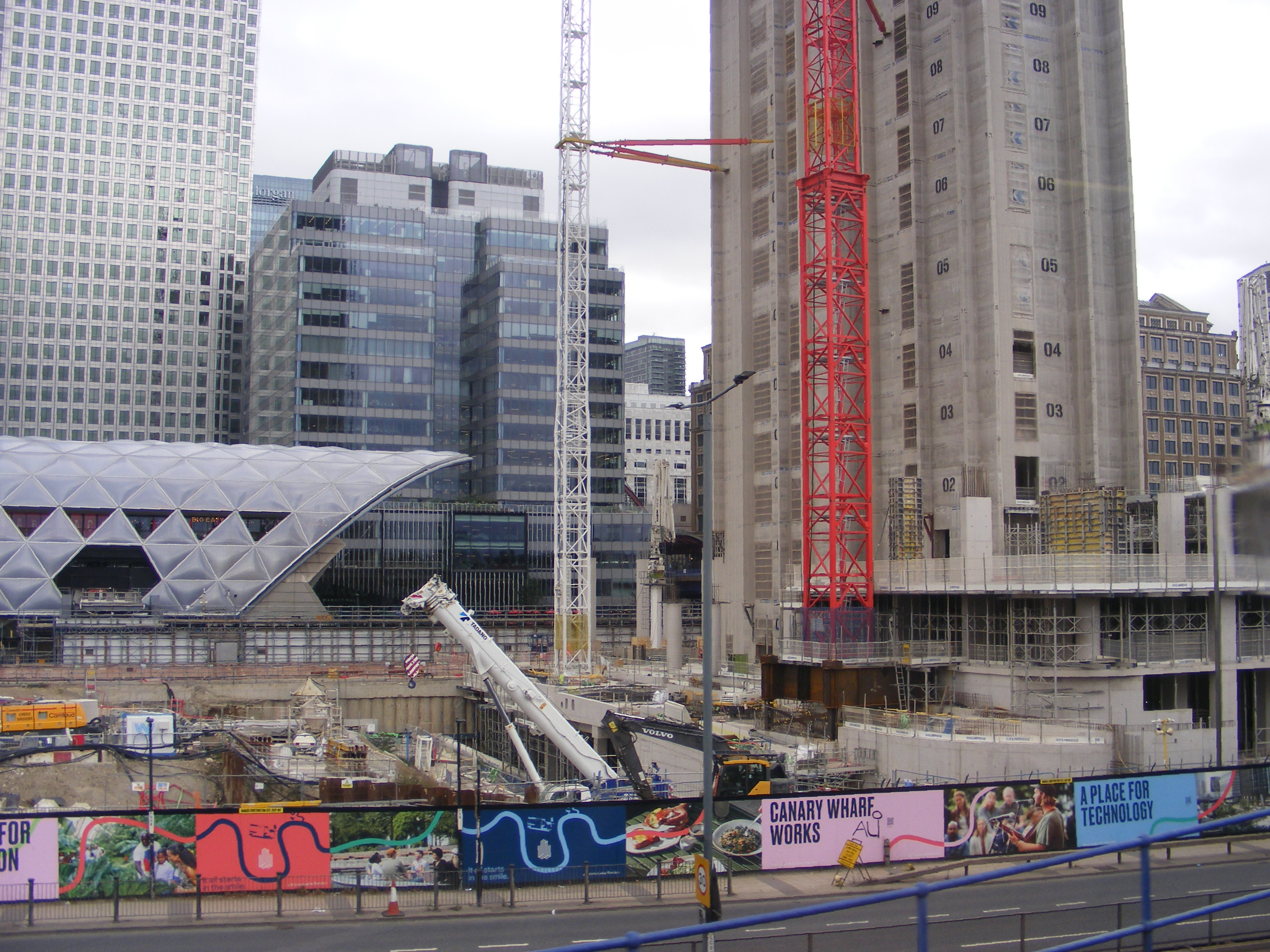
Construction in August 2025

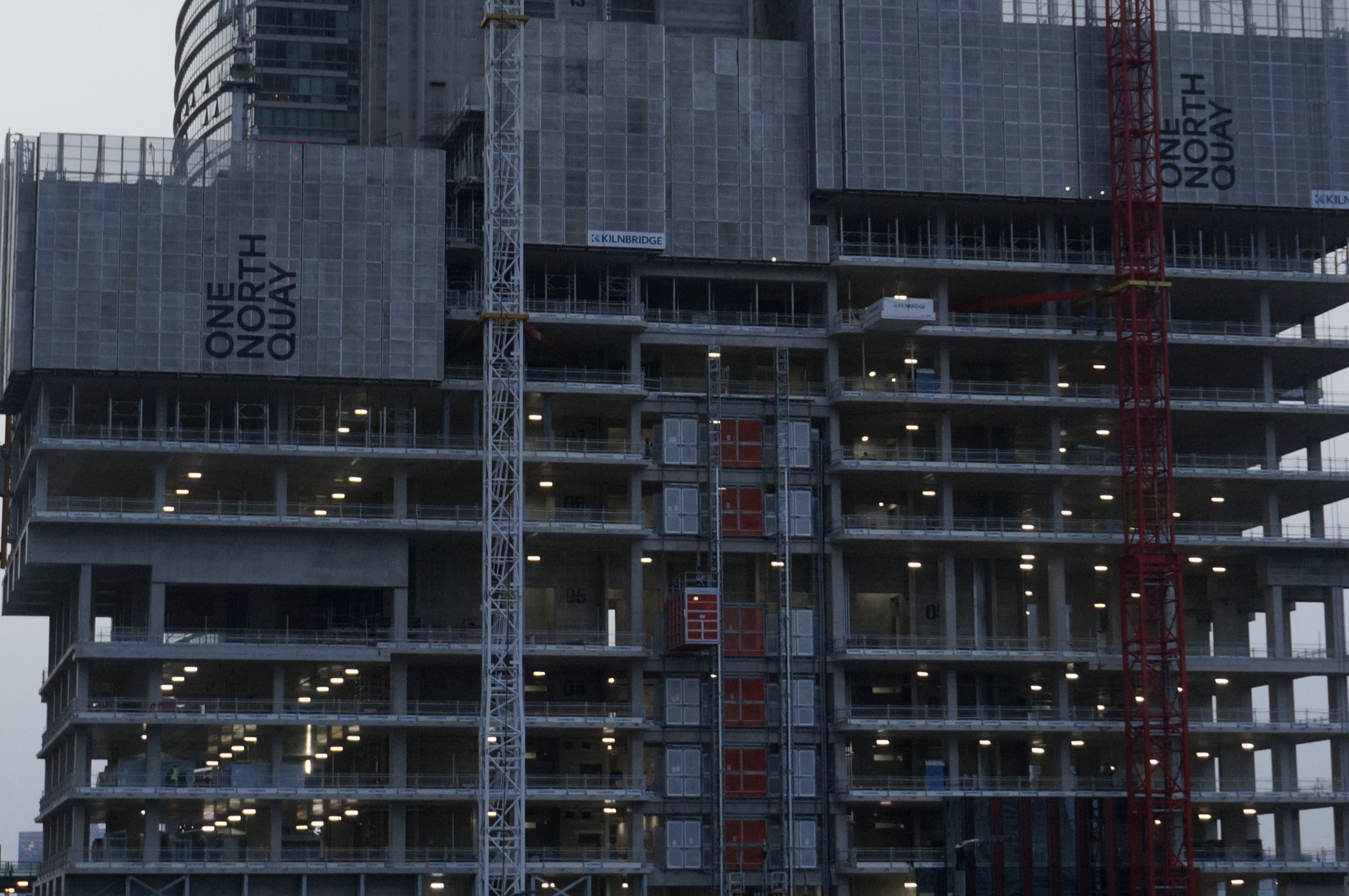
Construction of One North Quay in March 2026

== See also ==
- Tall buildings in London
