= South Dock, Rotherhithe =

Dock in Rotherhithe, London

Coordinates: 51°29′36.32″N 0°02′8.77″W

East Country Dock (Rotherhithe) Act 1811
- Act of Parliament
- Parliament of the United Kingdom
- Long title: An Act for completing and maintaining The East Country Dock at Rotherhithe, in the County of Surrey.
- Citation: 51 Geo. 3. c. clxxi
- Territorial extent: United Kingdom

Dates
- Royal assent: 15 June 1811
- Commencement: 15 June 1811 (Note: The Acts of Parliament (Commencement) Act 1793.)
- Repealed: 1 January 1865
Other legislation
Amended by	East Country Dock Act 1825; Grand Collier Docks Act 1837
Repealed by	Surrey Commercial Dock Act 1864

Status: Repealed

Text of statute as originally enacted

South Dock is one of two surviving docks in the former Surrey Commercial Docks in Rotherhithe, London, England. It was built in 1807–1811 just south of the larger Greenland Dock, to which it is connected by a channel now known as Greenland Cut; it also has a lock giving access to the River Thames. Originally named the East Country Dock, it was renamed in 1850 when the Surrey Commercial Dock Company purchased and enlarged it. Timber and grain were the main products imported and exported in the dock.

== World War II ==
The dock was seriously damaged by German attacks in World War II when the area was heavily bombed by the Luftwaffe. Due to bomb damage in Greenland Dock, South Dock became the only exit from that dock. It was emptied of shipping in 1944, drained and used for the construction of concrete sections for the Mulberry Harbours used on D-Day. After the war, it was repaired and the surrounding warehouses rebuilt.

== After the war ==
The revival of the Surrey Docks proved short-lived with the advent of containerisation from the 1960s onwards. The new container ships were much too big to be accommodated in the upstream London docks and, with a few exceptions, most of the river trade moved downriver to Tilbury and other more modern ports around the country. The Surrey Docks closed in December 1970 and were sold to the London Borough of Southwark in 1977.

== Redevelopment ==
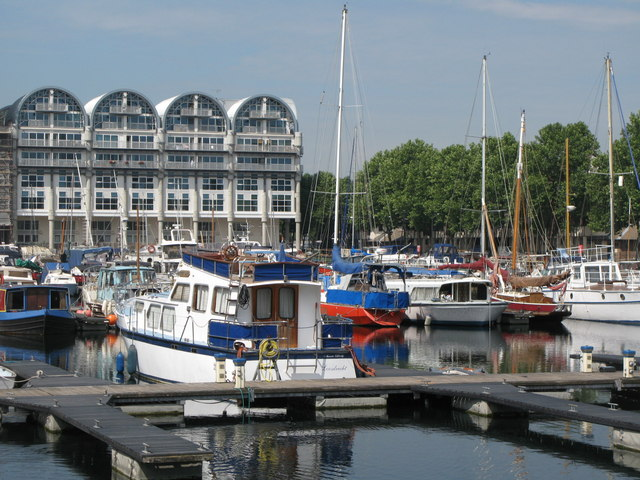
South Dock Housing and marina

Although most of the Surrey Docks were infilled and converted to residential, commercial or light industrial land, South Dock escaped this fate. The former warehouses were demolished and replaced with residential blocks, while the dock itself was refurbished. Residential development in the area received funding from the London Docklands Development Corporation, erecting unique buildings, such as Baltic Quay. In 1994, South Dock reopened as London's largest marina, with over 200 berths. It is now largely occupied by yachts and residential barges.

== Nearby places ==
- Canada Water
- Greenland Dock
- Russia Dock Woodland
- Surrey Quays
- Globe pond
- Centre Dock
- Norway Dock
