= Greenland Dock =

Dock in Rotherhithe, London, England

Coordinates: 51°29′39.80″N 0°02′24.85″W

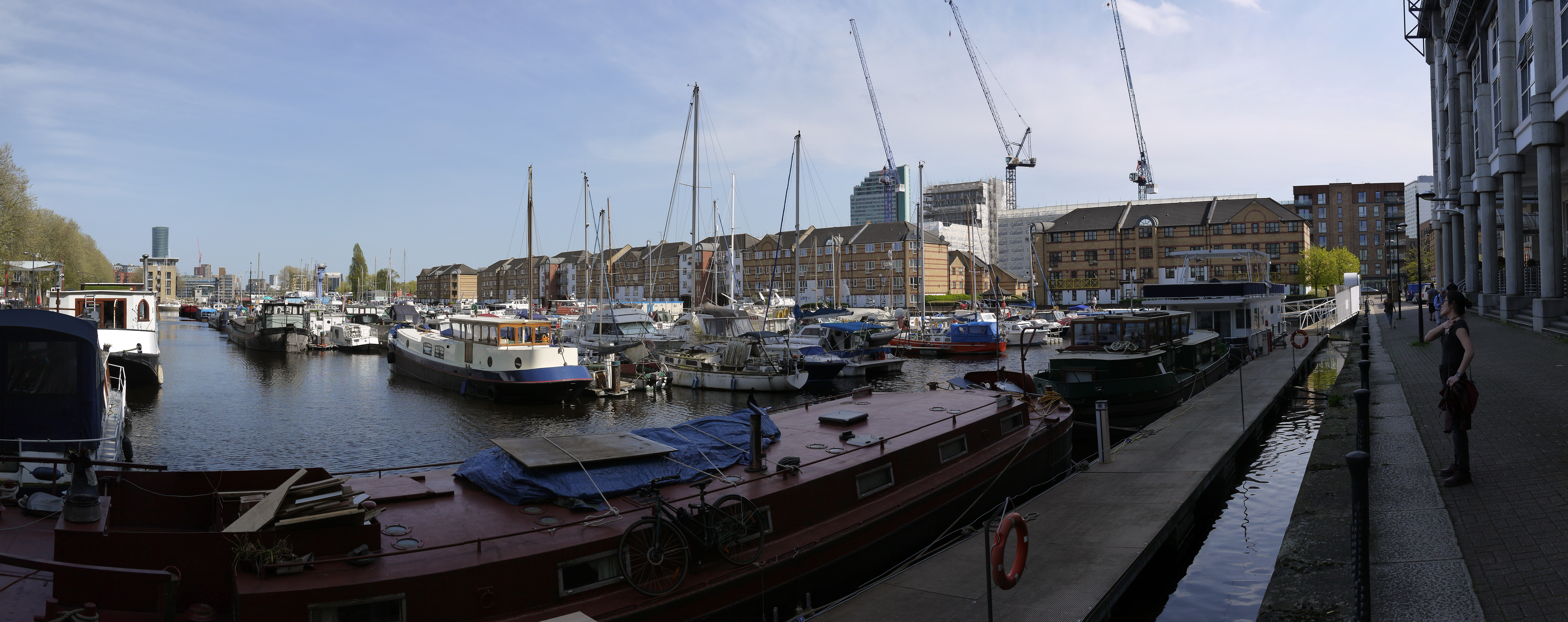
Greenland Dock Marina

Greenland Dock is the oldest of London's riverside wet docks, located in Rotherhithe area of the London Borough of Southwark. It used to be part of the Surrey Commercial Docks, most of which have by now been filled in. Greenland Dock is now used purely for recreational purposes; it is one of only two functioning enclosed docks on the south bank of the River Thames, along with the smaller South Dock, to which it is connected by a channel now known as Greenland Cut.

== History ==
=== Howland Great Wet Dock ===
Howland Great Wet Dock Act 1695
- Act of Parliament
- Parliament of England
- Long title: An Act to enable Trustees to raise Money, for the making a Wet Dock, and improving the Estate of the Marquis and Marchioness of Tavistock, at Rodherhith, in the County of Surrey.
- Citation: 7 & 8 Will. 3. c. 25 Pr.
- Territorial extent: England and Wales

Dates
- Royal assent: 10 April 1696

Status: Current legislation

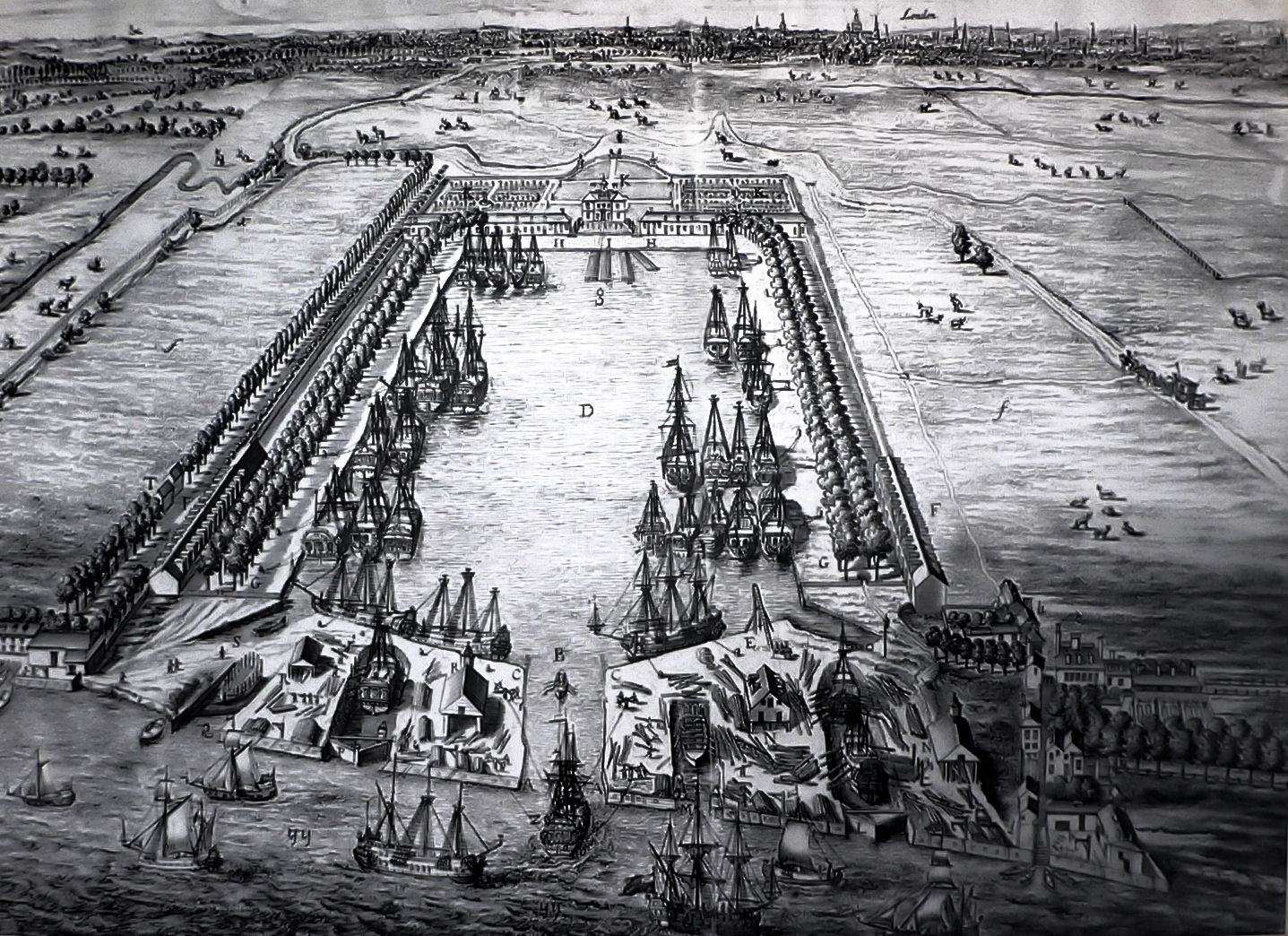
View of the Howland Great Wet Dock in 1717 looking west across the Rotherhithe peninsula

The dock was originally laid out between 1696 and 1699 on land owned by the aristocratic Russell family of the 1st Duke of Bedford. The Russells had been given a portion of land in lower Rotherhithe by a wealthy Streatham landowner, John Howland, as part of a wedding dowry for his daughter Elizabeth, granddaughter of Sir Josiah Child – the dictatorial chairman of the East India Company, who married Wriothesley Russell, the Marquis of Tavistock. They immediately set about "improving" the rural property, obtaining permission in 1696 in the Howland Great Wet Dock Act 1695 (7 & 8 Will. 3. c. 25 Pr.) to construct a rectangular dock with an area of about 10 acres (4.0 ha), capable of accommodating around 120 ships. It was named Howland Great Wet Dock in honour of John Howland. Designed by local shipwright, John Wells, the dock was intended to refit East India ships.

In a picture of about 1717, it can be seen in a rural setting some miles outside the (much smaller) city of London, lined with trees on three sides (to act as windbreaks) and with the Russell family's mansion situated at the western end. Unlike the later docks, it was not built with cargo traffic in mind; it did not have walls, warehouses or other commercial facilities. Instead, it was promoted as being capable of accommodating ships "without the trouble of shifting, mooring or unmooring any in the dock for taking in or out any other". It was essentially a re-fitting base where ships could be repaired and berthed in a sheltered anchorage. It was aided in this regard by its proximity to the dockyards at Deptford.

=== Whaling and timber trades ===
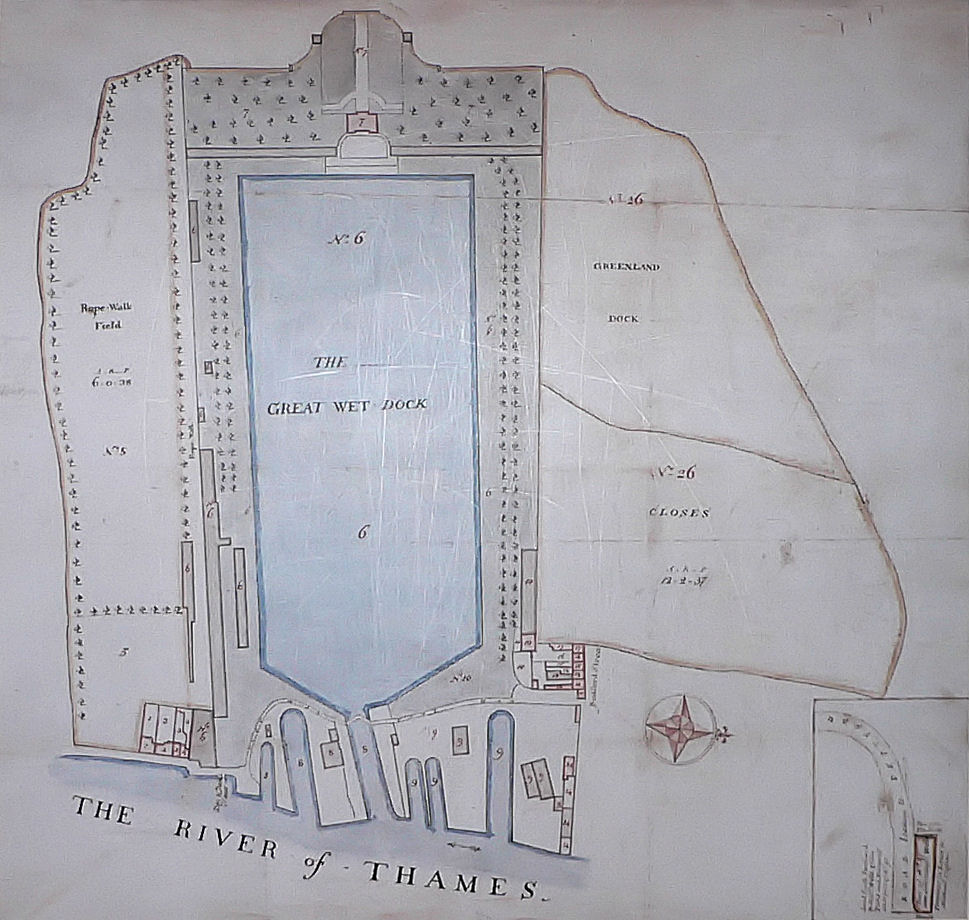
Manuscript plan of the Greenland Dock, 1763

From the 1720s, Greenland whalers also used the dock and substantial blubber boiling houses were built to produce oil on the south side. Howland Great Wet Dock was sold by the fourth Duke of Bedford in 1763. Extensive usage by the Greenland whaling ships prompted the dock to be renamed Greenland Dock. However, this trade declined sharply by the start of the 19th century.

In 1806 the dock was sold to William Richie, a Greenwich timber merchant and founder of the Commercial Dock Company (1807). The company built a series of additional docks and two new timber ponds to the north while rival companies built additional docks, leading to the jumble of harbours, canals and timber ponds. In 1865, the company merged with the neighbouring Surrey Docks to form the Surrey Commercial Docks, controlling some 80% of London's timber trade.

Greenland Dock remained at the centre of London's timber trade for well over a century to come. It was lined with warehouses and immense piles of construction timber or "deal wood", which were maintained by the athletic deal porters. Much of the timber arrived aboard small sailing vessels from the Baltic region, although these were eventually displaced by large steamers.

=== Expansion and decline ===
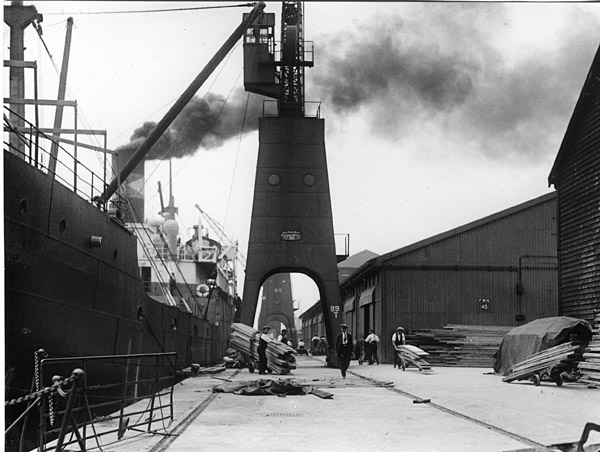
Unloading timber at Greenland Dock, 1927

Between 1895 and 1904 Greenland Dock was greatly extended to the west at a cost of £940,000, in a project carried out under Sir John Wolfe Barry, the engineer who built Tower Bridge. More than doubling in length and nearly doubling in depth, in its final form it covered an area of 22 1/2 acres (9.1 ha), with a depth of 31 feet (9.4 m) and a length of 2,250 feet (690 m), which cut straight across the old Grand Surrey Canal. It was also given a large lock, 550 feet (170 m) long, 80 feet (24 m) wide and 35 feet (11 m) deep. This renovation enabled the dock to take large cargo ships and even ocean-going liners. Cunard Line A-class vessels of as much as 14,000 long tons (14,000 t), driven by large steam engines and carrying passengers and cargoes in both directions, sailed regularly from Greenland Dock to the St. Lawrence River in Canada. They were considered huge ships for so far upstream and they had to be swung round in the river to enter the lock.

In 1909 the dock, along with all of the other London docks, was amalgamated into the Port of London under the management of the Port of London Authority.

In the same era as the big steamships there were, by contrast, the barques and barquentines of less than a tenth the size that brought timber from Finland: survivors of the age of sail with three or more masts and representatives of the Baltic side of the timber trade. Finland Quay, Swedish Quay, Norway Dock and Russia Dock were some of the names arising from what had been the original part of Rotherhithe's timber trade.

Greenland Dock suffered greatly during World War II, when many of the warehouses were razed by German bombing and the great lock was rendered unusable due to bomb damage. It soon recovered after the war and enjoyed a brief resurgence of prosperity. However, technological changes in the shipping industry soon pushed the dock into a spiral of decline. The deal porters' jobs were abolished from 1958 when timber started to be packaged. Not long afterwards, the shipping industry moved en masse to the system of containerization, which required bulk carriers far too large to be accommodated in the London docks. In 1970, the Surrey Commercial Docks were closed. Greenland Dock was sold to Southwark council.

== Redevelopment ==
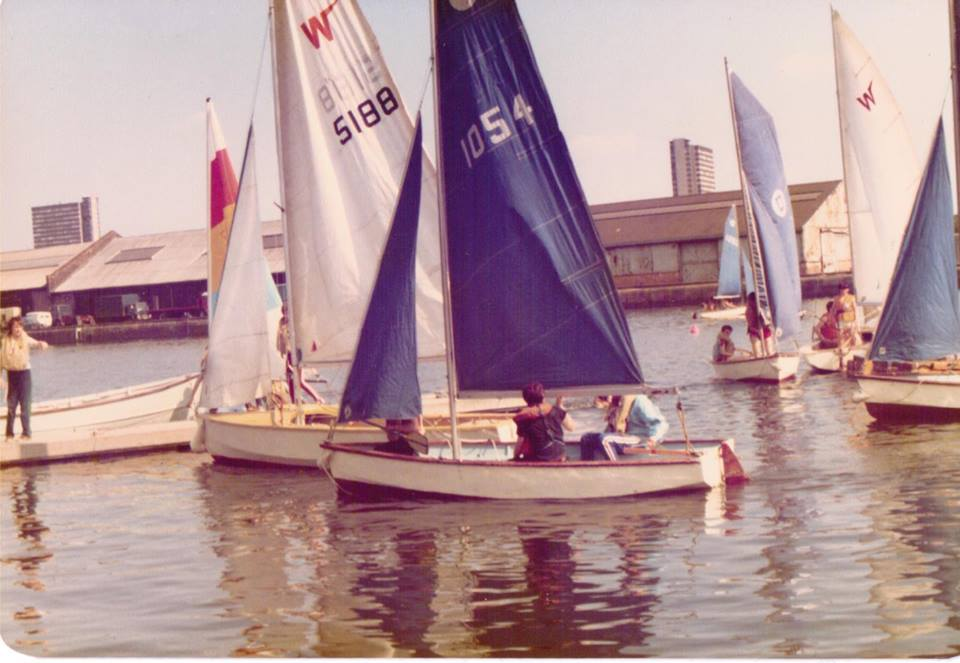
The ILEA water sports centre, 1980

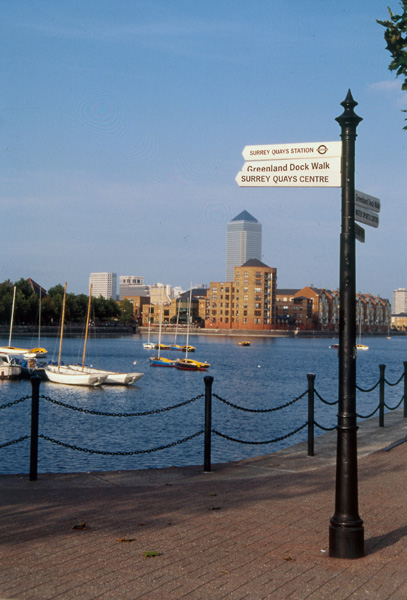
Greenland Dock, Surrey Quays, circa 1995

The Surrey Docks remained derelict for over a decade, with much of the warehousing demolished and over 90% of the docks filled in. Greenland Dock, which now belonged to the local authority, escaped this fate and in 1981 was handed over to the London Docklands Development Corporation. During this period the Inner London Education Authority ran a Surrey Docks Watersports Centre on the dock from a series of portable cabins at the Redriff Road end of the dock. It was at this centre many young people who would not have been exposed to sailing or canoeing were trained.

A masterplan was produced that advocated evicting the remaining industrial occupiers of the quaysides and transforming the dock into a residential area. This went ahead in the late 1980s despite some controversy, with seven residential developments being constructed on the site of the former warehouse complexes (and named after them; hence Swedish Yard became Swedish Quay, Brunswick Yard became Brunswick Quay, Baltic Yard became Baltic Quay and so on). Today the area is dominated by luxury residential developments, such as the Greenland Passage development and the gated New Caledonian Wharf. Additionally, a new watersports centre was constructed on the site of the former entrance to the now infilled Grand Surrey Canal. This has maintained the dock as a popular site for sailing, windsurfing, canoeing and dragon boat racing.

The dock itself is still substantially intact, other than its former entrances and exits, all but one of which have been filled in or blocked. It still has a working connection to South Dock, which is now a marina, and it has a small marina of its own at its eastern end. There are no traces of the former warehouses, although many of the old capstans and some of the hydraulic machines on the quayside have been preserved.

The alternative comedian Malcolm Hardee drowned in the dock in 2005 while stepping onto his houseboat, Sea Sovereign, from the floating pub he owned, the Wibbley Wobbley, which was moored at the Thames end of Greenland Dock.

== Transport ==
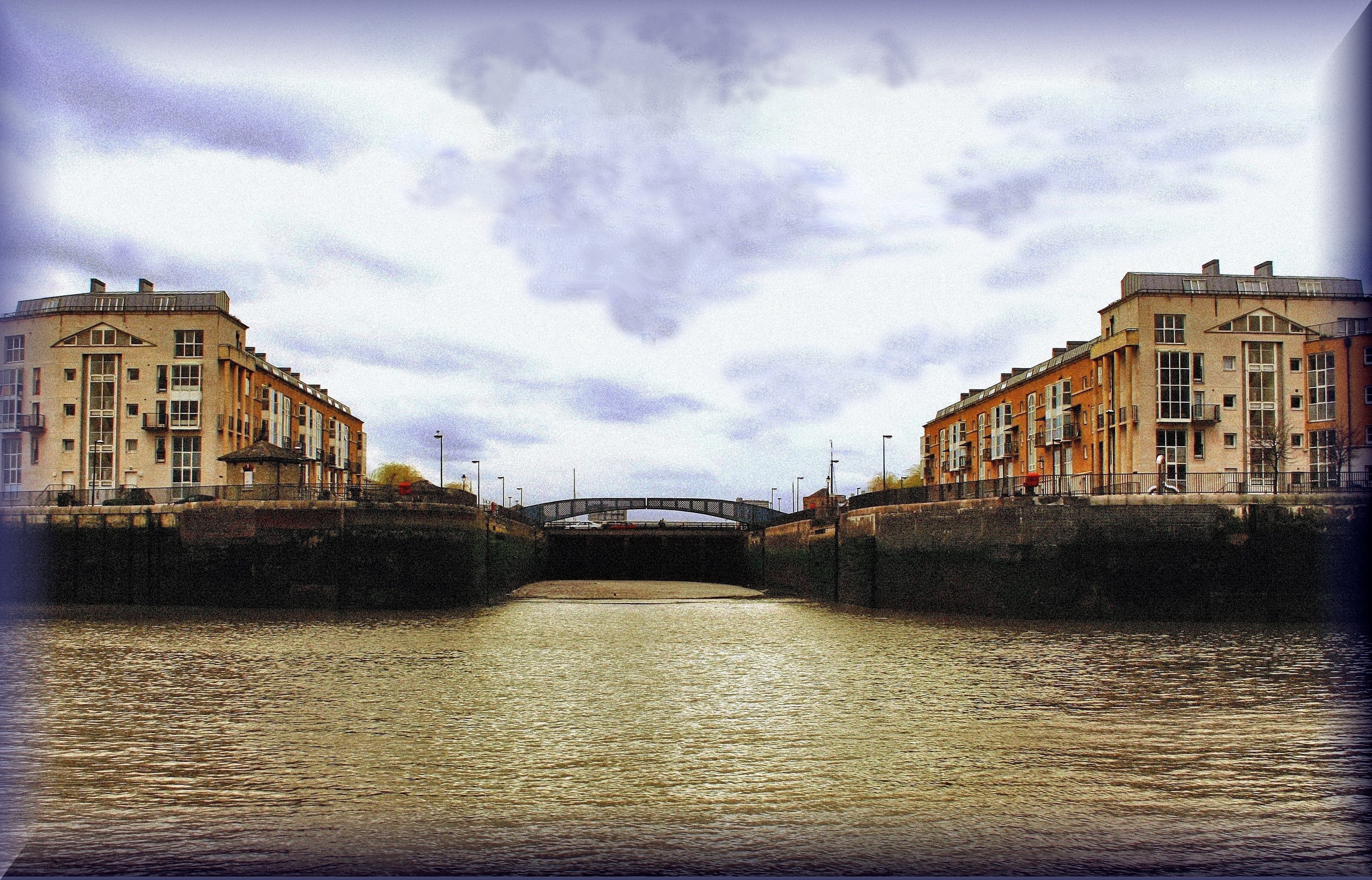
Residential development at Greenland Dock

The nearest London Underground station is Canada Water on the Jubilee line. The nearest London Overground stations are Surrey Quays and Canada Water, on the Windrush line.

Thames Clippers' water-bus serves Greenland Pier. The Thames Path passes along the southern bank of the River Thames.

== Nearby places ==
- Canada Water
- Russia Dock Woodland
- South Dock
- Surrey Quays
