= Surrey Quays =

Area of Rotherhithe in south-east London, England

Coordinates: 51.492°N 0.0445°W

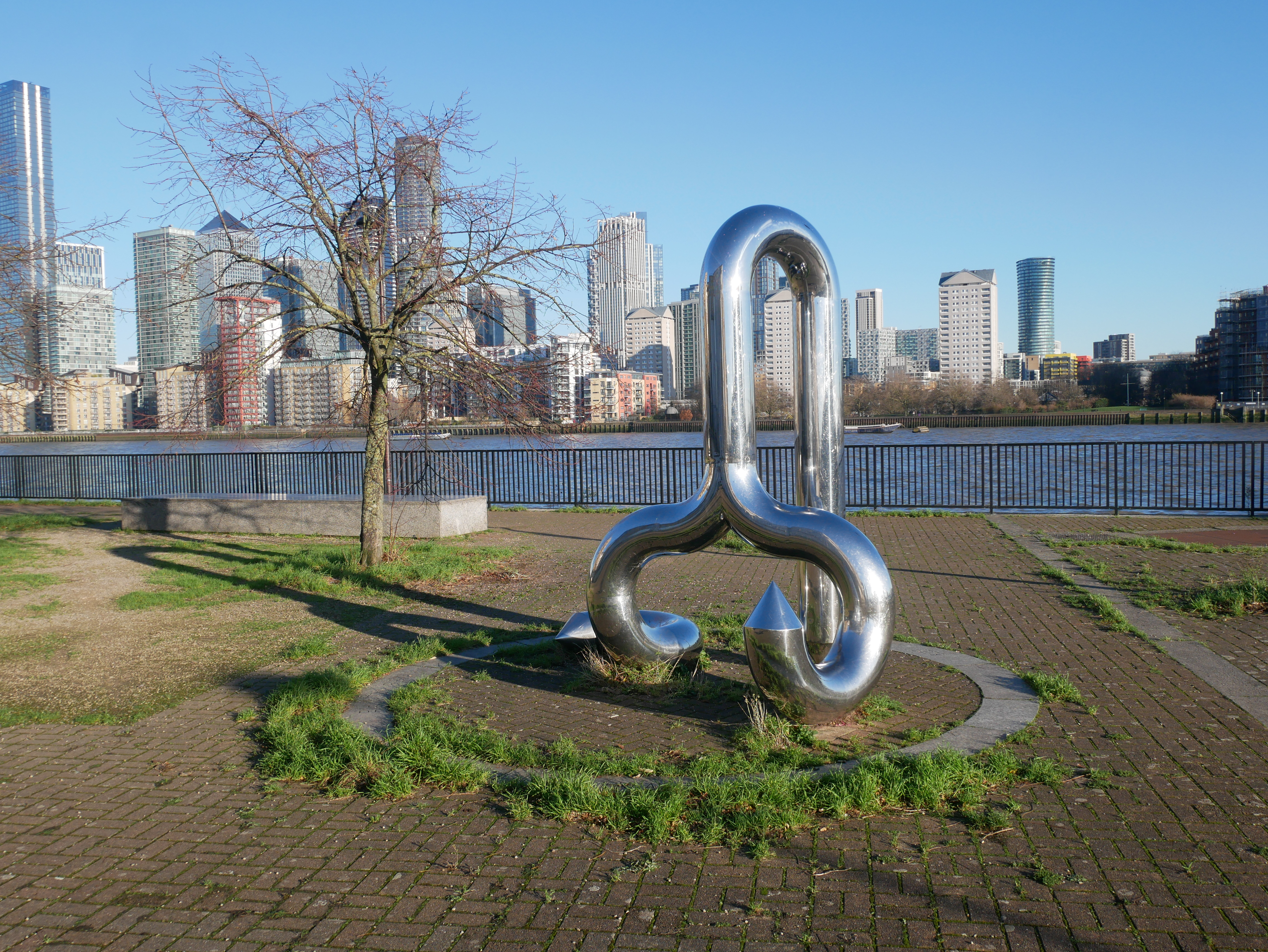
- The River Thames and Canary Wharf as viewed from behind Greenland Dock

- Location within Greater London
- OS grid reference: TQ356789
- London borough: Southwark
- Ceremonial county: Greater London
- Region: London
- Country: England
- Sovereign state: United Kingdom
- Post town: LONDON
- Postcode district: SE16
- Dialling code: 020
- Police: Metropolitan
- Fire: London
- Ambulance: London
- London Assembly: Lambeth and Southwark

Surrey Quays is a largely residential area of Rotherhithe in south-east London, occupied until 1970 by the Surrey Commercial Docks. The precise boundaries of the area are somewhat amorphous, but it is generally considered to comprise the southern half of the Rotherhithe peninsula from Canada Water to South Dock; electorally, Surrey Docks is the eastern half of the peninsula. The area is served by Surrey Quays railway station on the Windrush line of the London Overground. Surrey Docks are so called because the borders of Surrey and Kent met in this area until 1889.

== History ==
After the closure of the docks, the area remained derelict for over a decade; much of the warehousing was demolished and over 90% of the docks filled in. The only surviving areas of open water were Greenland Dock, South Dock, part of Canada Dock (renamed Canada Water), remnants of Norway Dock and a basin renamed Surrey Water.

In 1981, the Conservative government of Prime Minister Margaret Thatcher established the London Docklands Development Corporation to redevelop the former dockyard areas of east London, including the Surrey Docks.

Surrey Quays shopping centre was opened in 1988 and Surrey Docks underground station was renamed Surrey Quays. A massive building programme took place in the area during the late 1980s and early 1990s, with 5,500 new homes being built; this ranged from individual detached housing to large apartment complexes, such as Baltic Quay. South Dock was converted into a marina – now the largest in London – and a sailing facility (named Surrey Docks Watersports Centre) was constructed on Greenland Dock. The northern part of Canada Water and the infilled Russia Dock became wildlife reserves. Leisure facilities and a number of light industrial plants were also built, notably a new printing works for Associated Newspapers, the publisher of the London Evening Standard and the Daily Mail. This site was the headquarters of Metro (British newspaper) from its launch in 1999 until 2006, when the newspaper's production was relocated to Kensington, west London. A further phase of development at Canada Water began around 2005 and is still underway. The location of Canada Water Surrey Quays lends its name to local property developer CWSQ.

Since 2007, there have been campaigns to change the name of the railway station back to Surrey Docks.

== Transport ==
The area is served by Surrey Quays railway station on the London Overground route. The nearest London Underground station is at Canada Water, on the Jubilee line.

Surrey Quays is served by Transport for London bus services 1, 47, 188, 199, 225, 381, C10 and P12; night buses N1, N199 and N381 also call here.

Greenland Dock Pier is the nearest place for boarding London River Services, operated by Thames Clippers.

== Gallery ==
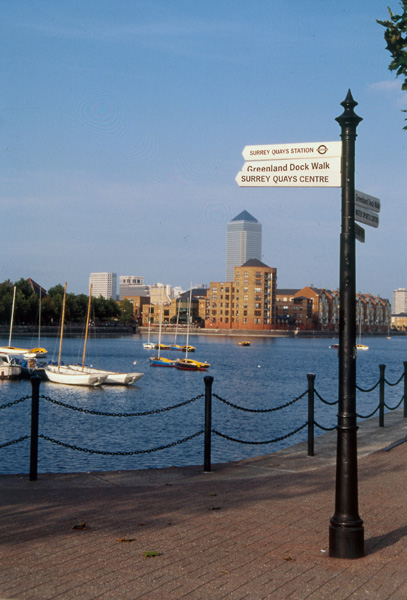
Greenland Dock in the early 1990s

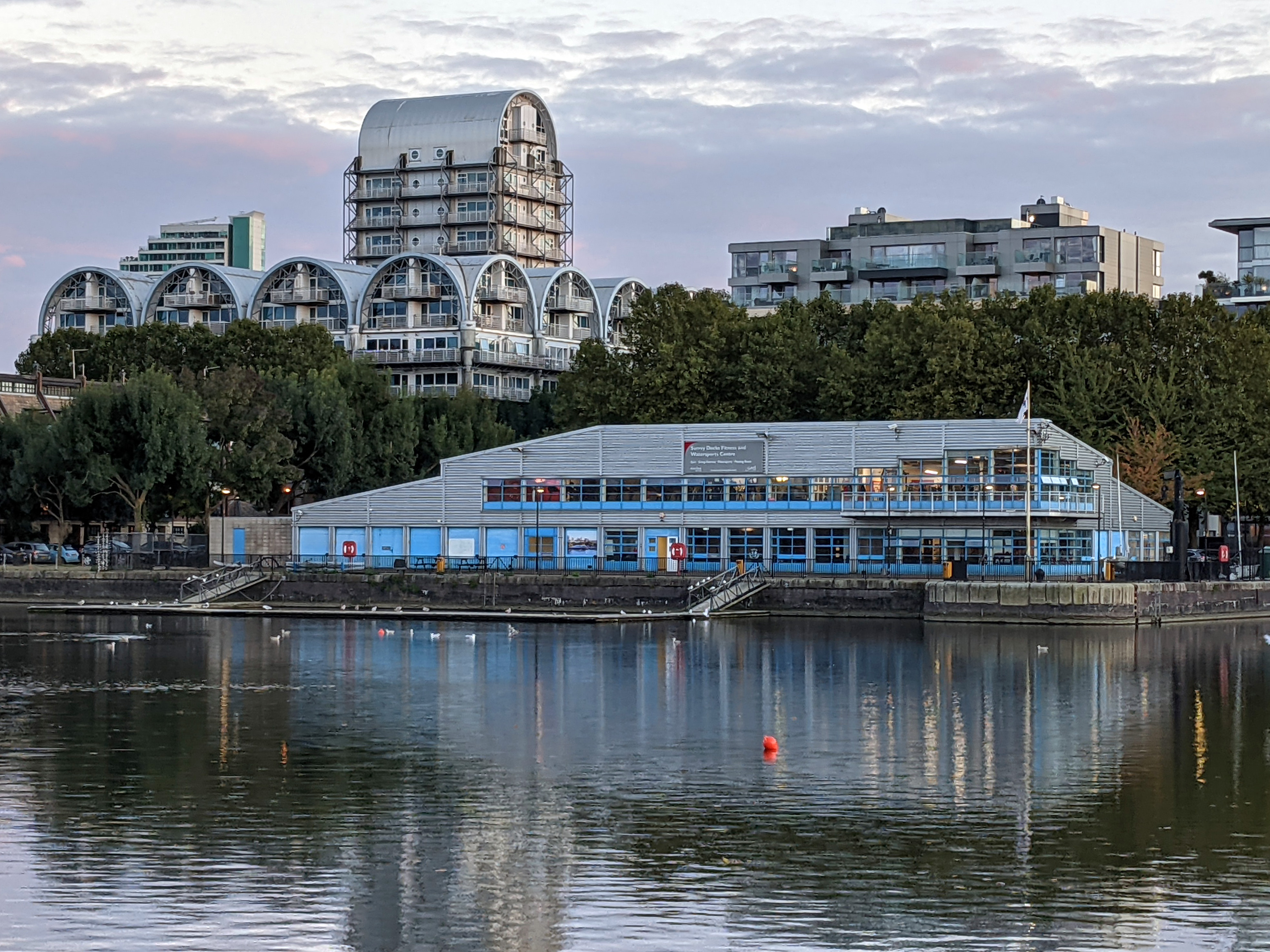
Surrey Docks Fitness & Water Sports Centre

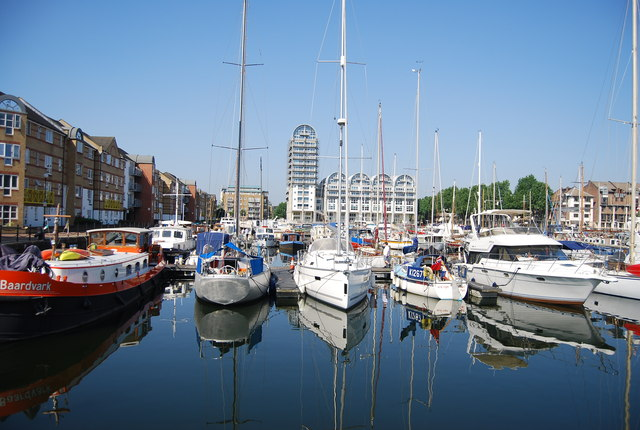
South Dock Marina

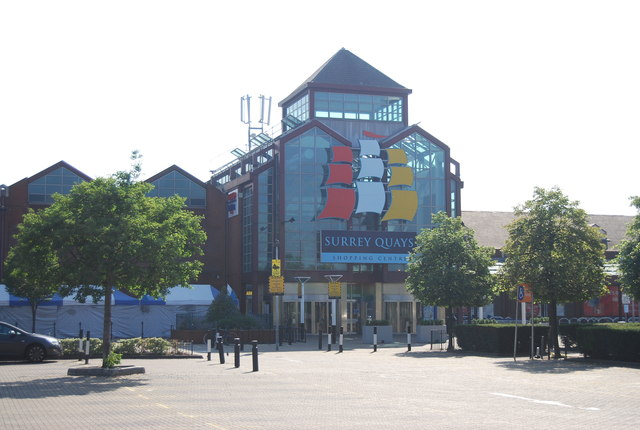
Surrey Quays Shopping Centre

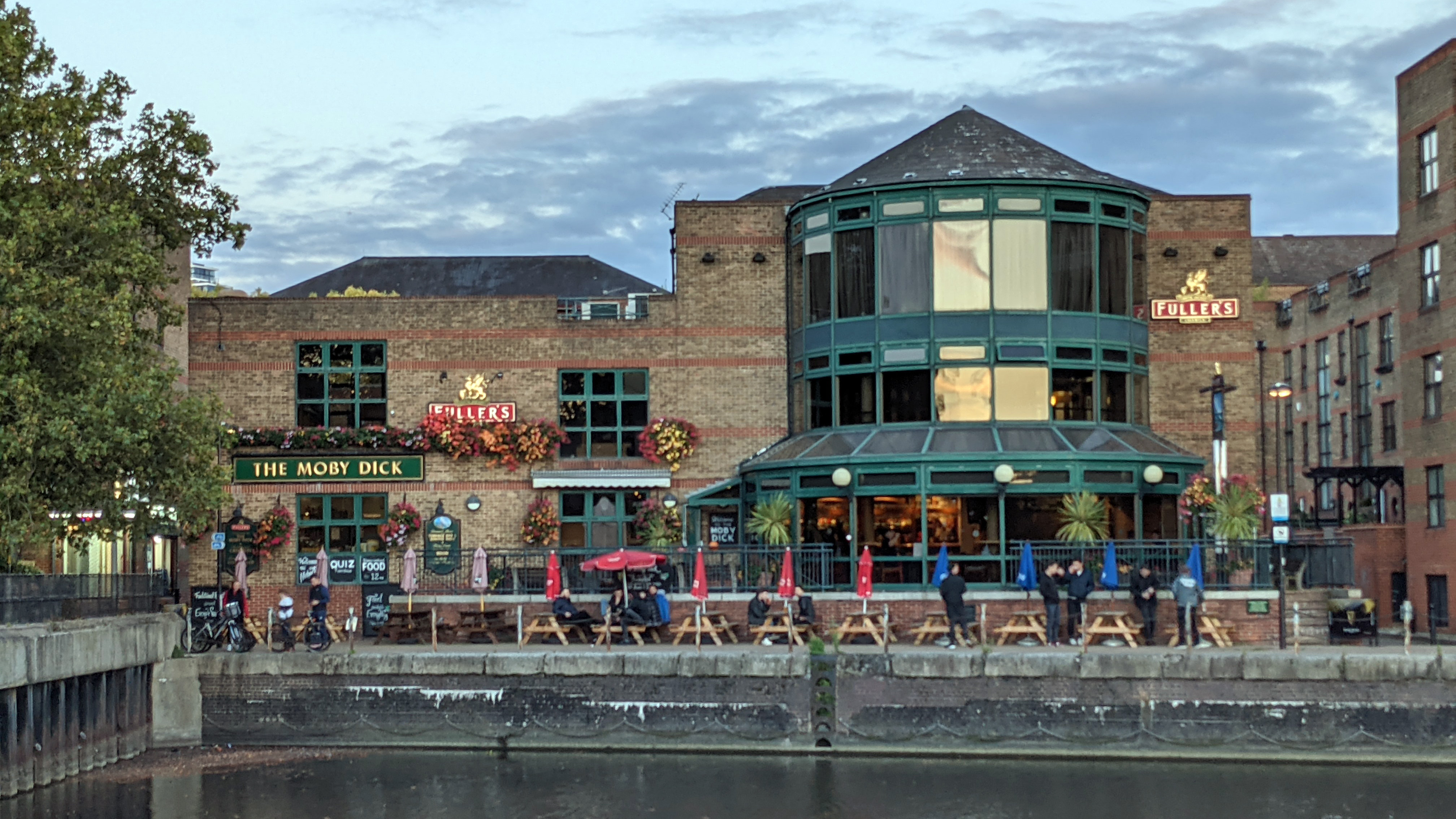
The Moby Dick pub, Greenland Dock

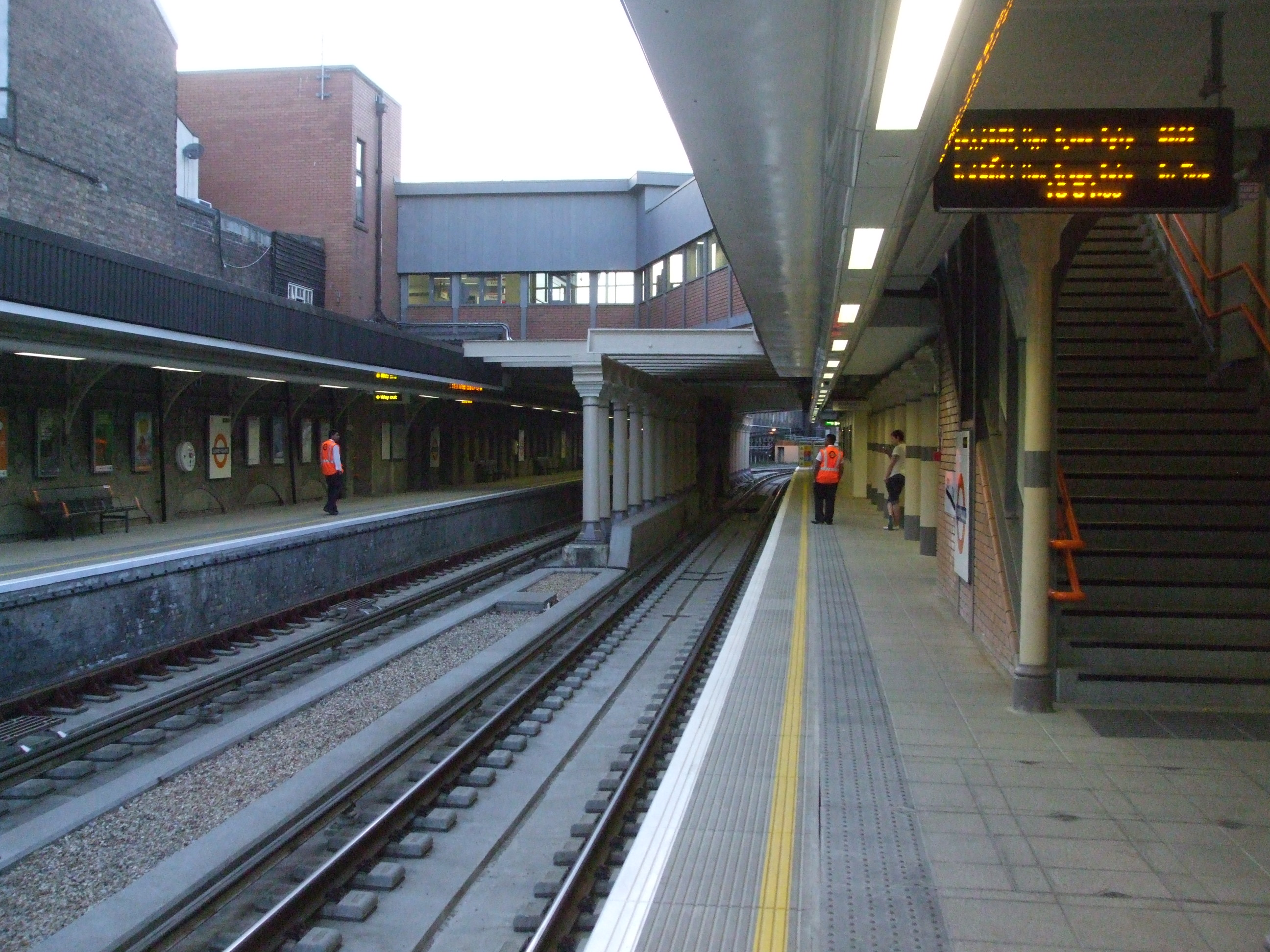
Surrey Quays station

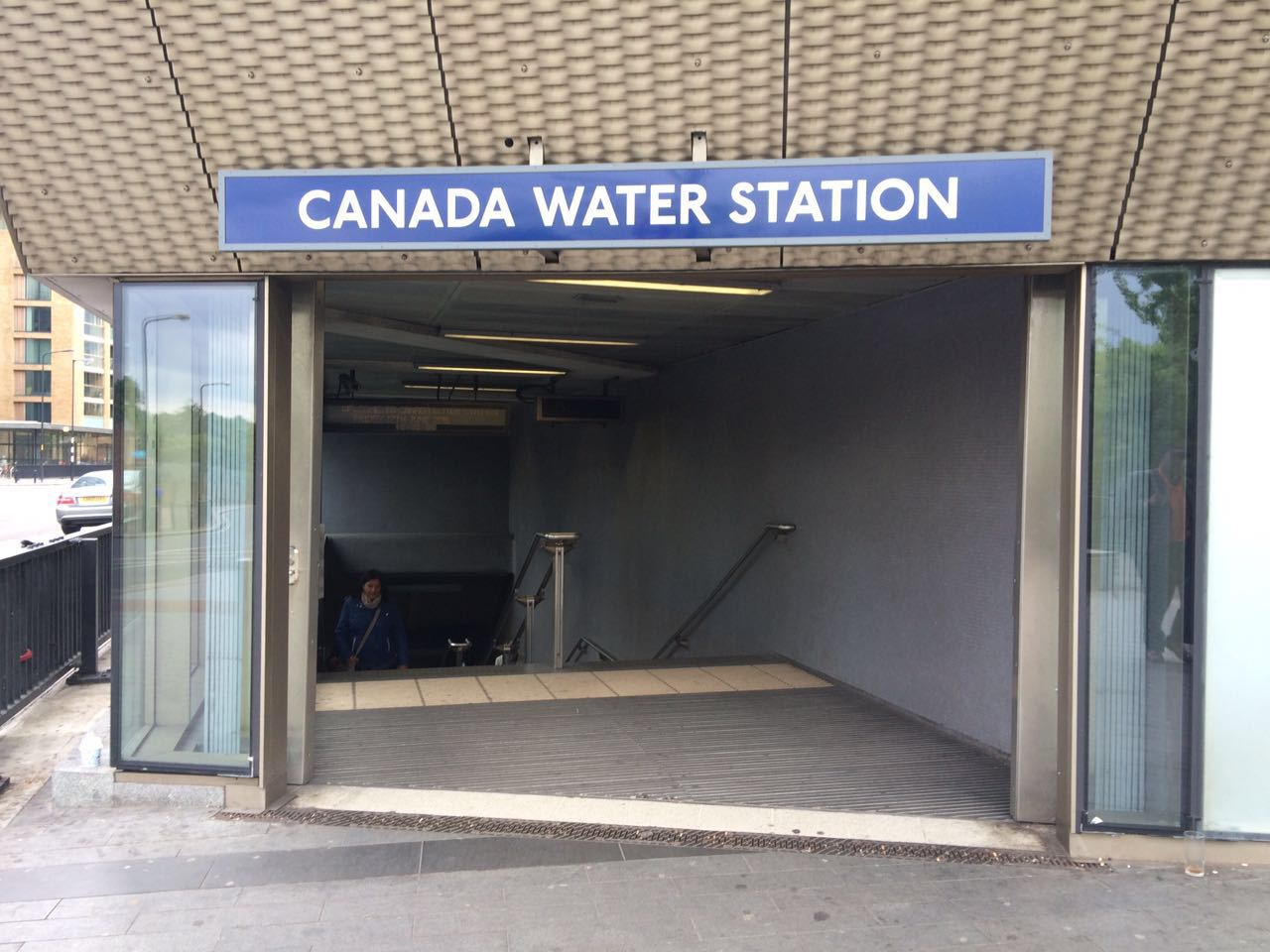
Entrance to Canada Water station
