= Grand Surrey Canal =

Canal in south London, England

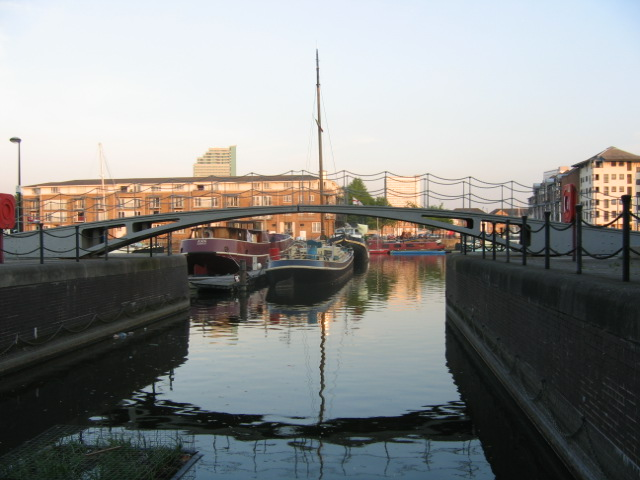
- The Norway Cut swing bridge crosses a channel from Greenland Dock to the closed Norway dock

Specifications
- Maximum boat length: 109 ft 0 in (33.22 m)
- Maximum boat beam: 18 ft 0 in (5.49 m)
- Locks: 1
- Status: Closed. Partly infilled.

History
- Date of act: 1801
- Date of first use: 1810
- Date completed: 1826
- Date closed: 1970s

Geography
- Start point: Camberwell
- End point: Surrey Commercial Docks, Rotherhithe
- Connects to: River Thames

The Grand Surrey Canal was a canal constructed in south London, England during the early 19th century. It opened to the Old Kent Road in 1807, to Camberwell in 1810, and to Peckham in 1826. Its main purpose was to transport cargo, primarily timber (or 'deal') from the Surrey Commercial Docks.

The Grand Surrey Canal closed progressively from the 1940s, with all but the Greenland Dock closing in the 1970s. Much of the route is traceable, as it has been turned into roadways and linear parks.

== History ==
During the late 1700s, there were a number of proposals for canals on the south bank of the River Thames, and several of the prominent canal engineers of the time were involved. John Smeaton looked at two possible routes for a canal between Kingston upon Thames and Ewell in 1778. Ralph Dodd, who was also involved with promoting the Thames and Medway Canal, proposed a canal with a number of branches linking Deptford, Clapham, Kingston, Ewell, Epsom, Mitcham and Croydon. A plan for a canal from Croydon to Wandsworth was thought to be impractical by William Jessop and John Rennie, because the main source of water in the area through which it would run was the River Wandle, and this supplied a number of mills which would be affected if the river was used to supply the canal. Jessop also advised on a canal from Vauxhall to Rotherhithe in 1796, while in 1799, a railway from London through Croydon to Portsmouth, using horses to pull the wagons, was suggested. Eventually, three projects were submitted to parliament for approval. These were the Grand Surrey Canal, at the time called the Kent and Surrey Canal, the Croydon Canal linking Croydon and Rotherhithe, and the Surrey Iron Railway, a horse-drawn linking Croydon to Wandsworth, and all three were authorised in 1801.

Grand Surrey Canal Act 1801
- Act of Parliament
- Parliament of the United Kingdom
- Long title: An act for making and maintaining a navigable canal from the river Thames at or near a place called Wilkinson's Gun Wharf, in the parish of Saint Mary at Rotherhithe in the county of Surrey, to the town of Mitcham, in the parish of Mitcham, in the said county; and also divers collateral cuts or branches communicating from the same to certain parishes and places within the counties of Surrey and Kent.
- Citation: 41 Geo. 3. (U.K.) c. xxxi
- Territorial extent: United Kingdom

Dates
- Royal assent: 21 May 1801
- Commencement: 21 May 1801 (Note: The Acts of Parliament (Commencement) Act 1793.)
Other legislation
Amended by	Grand Surrey Canal Act 1808; Grand Collier Docks Act 1837; Grand Surrey Docks and Canal Act 1855; Surrey Commercial Dock Act 1864

Status: Partially repealed

The Grand Surrey Canal was authorised by an act of Parliament, the Grand Surrey Canal Act 1801 (41 Geo. 3. (U.K.) c. xxxi) obtained on 21 May 1801, which created the Company of Proprietors of the Grand Surrey Canal, and gave them powers to raise £60,000 by issuing shares, and an additional £30,000 if required. They were authorised to build a canal from Rotherhithe, on the River Thames, to Mitcham in what was then Surrey, with branches to any places within 1,500 yards (1,400 m) of the main line. Branches to Deptford, Peckham, the Borough, and one to rejoin the Thames at Vauxhall were included, but proposals for a branch from Mitcham to Croydon, and another to Kingston, which would have created a route to bypass the Thames through London, were removed from the bill during the committee stages. Those who opposed the canal ensured that clauses restricting use of water from the Wandle were inserted.

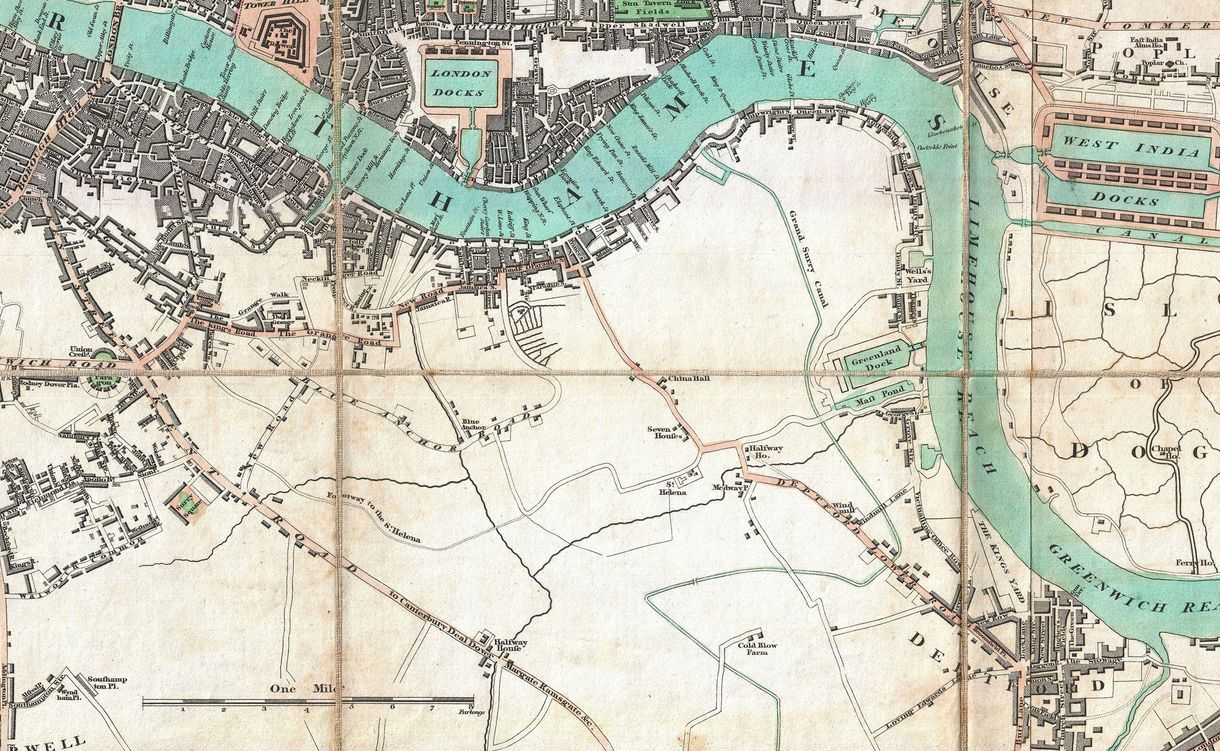
Grand Surrey Canal on Mogg Pocket or Case Map of London, 1806

Work began on the canal, but at the same time, the London dock system was in its early stages of development, and there were proposals by John Hall in 1802 to construct a dock at Rotherhithe, close to the lock by which the canal gained access to the Thames. The canal company agreed to construct it in 1803, and although it was poorly funded, the 3-acre (1.2 ha) basin, together with a ship lock, was completed and opened on 13 March 1807. The Croydon Canal, which had also been authorised in 1801, proposed to join the Surrey Canal near Deptford, to save having to construct a parallel route to the Thames. The prospect of rent from this arrangement helped the company to open the first 3 miles (5 km) of the canal, as far as the Old Kent Road, in 1807, but their resolve to complete the canal had been lost, as the docks seemed a more lucrative prospect.

Grand Surrey Canal Act 1807
- Act of Parliament
- Parliament of the United Kingdom
- Long title: An Act to enable the Company of Proprietors of the Grand Surrey Canal to complete the same.
- Citation: 47 Geo. 3 Sess. 2. c. lxxx
- Territorial extent: United Kingdom

Dates
- Royal assent: 8 August 1807
- Commencement: 8 August 1807
- Repealed: 9 August 1855
Other legislation
Repealed by	Grand Surrey Docks and Canal Act 1855

Status: Repealed

Grand Surrey Canal Act 1808
- Act of Parliament
- Parliament of the United Kingdom
- Long title: An Act to enable the Company of Proprietors of the Grand Surrey Canal to supply with Water the several Towns, Districts, and Places therein mentioned, and to amend the several Acts relating to the said Canal.
- Citation: 48 Geo. 3. c. xcix
- Territorial extent: United Kingdom

Dates
- Royal assent: 3 June 1808
- Commencement: 3 June 1808
- Repealed: 9 August 1855
Other legislation
Amends	Grand Surrey Canal Act 1801
Repealed by	Grand Surrey Docks and Canal Act 1855

Status: Repealed

Text of statute as originally enacted

Grand Surrey Canal and Rotherhithe Branch Act 1811
- Act of Parliament
- Parliament of the United Kingdom
- Long title: An Act to enable the Company of Proprietors of the Grand Surrey Canal to make a Collateral Cut, communicating therewith, in the Parish of Saint Mary Rotherhithe, in the County of Surrey, and to enable the said Company to complete the said Canal; and for amending the several Acts relating thereto.
- Citation: 51 Geo. 3. c. clxx
- Territorial extent: United Kingdom

Dates
- Royal assent: 15 June 1811
- Commencement: 15 June 1811
- Repealed: 1 January 1865
Other legislation
Repealed by	Surrey Commercial Dock Act 1864

Status: Repealed

Text of statute as originally enacted

However, a second act of Parliament, the Grand Surrey Canal Act 1807 (47 Geo. 3 Sess. 2. c. lxxx), authorised them to raise another £60,000, which was used to extend the canal to Memel Wharf and a basin at Camberwell. This work was completed in 1810. So far, the route had been level, but to go any further would have needed locks or inclined planes, and the expected costs of their construction did not inspire the company to proceed with them. A short branch of about 1/2 mile (0.80 km) was constructed in 1826, running from Glengall Wharf to Peckham Basin. Two further acts of Parliament were obtained, the Grand Surrey Canal Act 1808 (48 Geo. 3. c. xcix) and the Grand Surrey Canal and Rotherhithe Branch Act 1811 (51 Geo. 3. c. clxx) to allow new funds to be committed to the project.

=== Development ===
In 1812, the canal was closed for two months while the company finished work on a new dock and connecting lock, which opened in November. Although no extensions to the canal other than the Peckham Branch were made, there was intermittent interest in such schemes. Some land was bought along the route of an extension from Camberwell to Kennington, which was considered in 1817, but was rejected because construction would require a deep cutting, restricting the amount of land available for wharves. The Peckham Branch, when it opened in May 1826, ended at a basin which was 450 by 80 feet (137 by 24 m), because of the demand for wharf space. When the London and Croydon Railway bill was passing through Parliament in 1835, which would result in the closure of the Croydon Canal, the Grand Surrey company managed to insert clauses into the bill to protect their canal against a low-level railway crossing, but failed to include a compensation clause for loss of trade from the Croydon Canal when it closed in 1838.

The engineer Henry Price approached the company in 1835 with a grand scheme for branches from the canal to the Thames at Vauxhall and Deptford, which would provide a route which was some 2 1/2 miles (4 km) shorter than the river route between Vauxhall and Rotherhithe. The scheme also included a railway along the bank of the canal from Vauxhall to Deptford, with a branch to Elephant and Castle. A prospectus was issued for the Grand Surrey Dock, Canal and Junction Railway Company, but there was little interest in subscribing the £600,000 capital needed, and the scheme foundered. Another scheme in 1850 was for a canal to the Kennet and Avon Canal at Reading, with branches to the Thames at Maidenhead, Datchet, Staines, Richmond, Mortlake, Wandsworth and Vauxhall. The route would have reduced the distance between Reading and Deptford from 42 miles (68 km) to 22 miles (35 km), but it seems unlikely that the estimated cost of only £500,000 was realistic.

The Rotherhithe end of the canal saw many changes, as the docks developed. As first built, the canal ended at the Stave Dock, which was connected to the Thames by a lock. This was replaced by a new lock in 1860, built to the west of the original, which linked the Thames to a triangular basin, known as the Surrey Basin, which was itself linked to Island Dock and Albion Dock. Island Dock led into Russia dock, where the canal had an entrance lock. The Commercial Dock Company built a number of docks to the east, and the rivalry between the two companies ended in 1864, when they amalgamated and the complex became part of the Surrey Commercial Docks. The canal entrance lock was swept away in 1904, when the Greenland Dock was extended, and a new entrance lock was built on its south side. By this time, nearly 1 mile (1.6 km) of the original canal had been destroyed by dock construction.

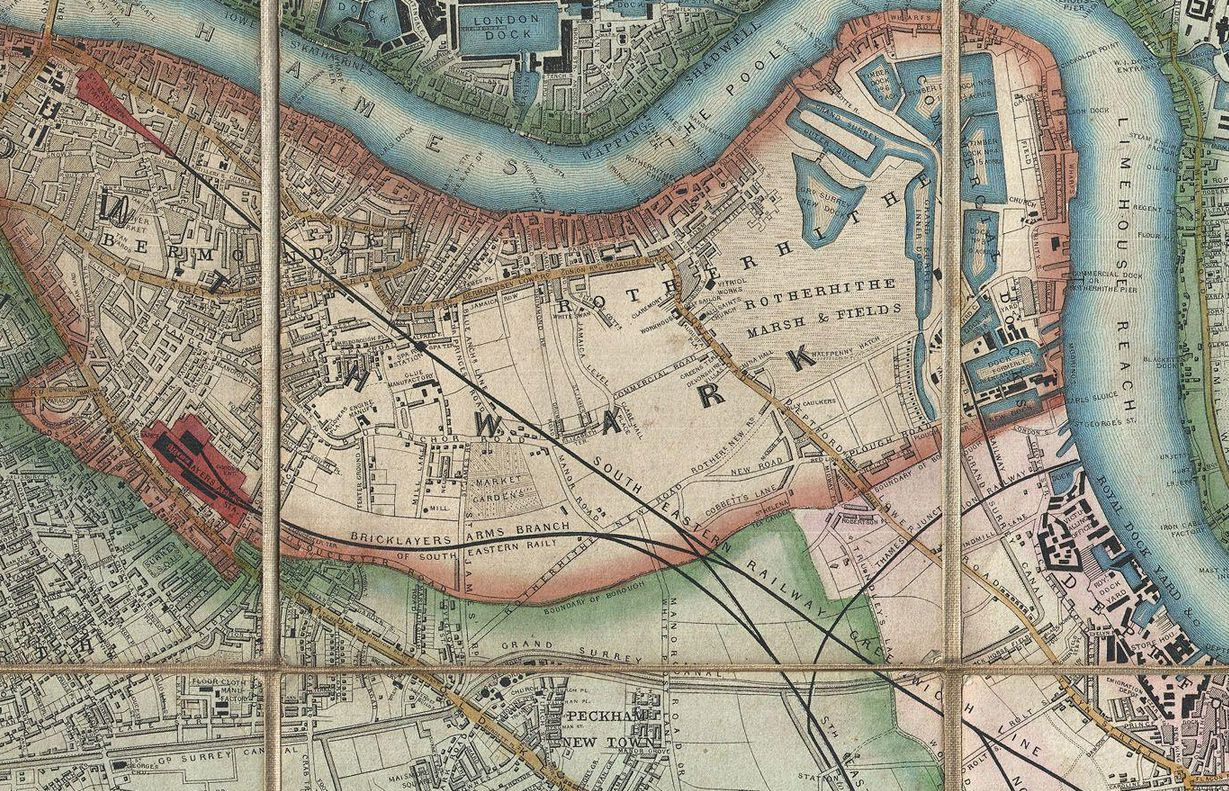
Grand Surrey Canal on Davies Pocket Map of London, 1852

During the second half of the 19th century, the canal was used by the South Metropolitan Gas Company to supply coal using its own fleet of tugs and barges to its gas works site on the Old Kent Road. The canal was also heavily used to move timber. Tolls for use of the canal were collected at four toll-houses, which were situated near Wells Street bridge in Camberwell, by the junction with the Peckham Branch, by the junction with the Croydon Canal, and at the junction with Greenland Dock. At each there was a gate across the towpath, which prevented progress until a toll had been paid. The gate was known as a "hatch", from the word for a gate or sluice, and the toll-houses were also called hatches by association. The canal was never very profitable, as stiff competition between the London dock companies kept toll rates low. A first dividend of 2 per cent was paid in 1819, which increased to 3 per cent the following year, but remained at or below this figure for the life of the canal.

Below the junction with the Croydon Canal, a railway bridge was built for the Deptford Wharf branch, which was authorised by the London and Croydon Railway Act 1846 (9 & 10 Vict. c. ccxxxiv). In 1854, the London, Brighton and South Coast Railway gained an act, the London, Brighton and South Coast Railway Act 1854 (17 & 18 Vict. c. lxi), and the Deptford Wharf Branch was re-routed over the canal at a lower level. The canal company campaigned for a swing bridge to be built, but the Railway Commissioners overruled their objections, and a vertical lifting bridge was installed. This was 13 feet (4.0 m) wide and 31 1/2 feet (9.6 m) long, and provided 9 1/2 feet (2.9 m) of headroom when it was raised. Operation was initially manual, but electric motors were later installed, and it continued to operate until the branch was lifted in 1964.

The Grand Surrey Canal was the first to have canal police (forerunners of the British Transport Police). "Bank rangers" were appointed in 1811 to keep law and order along the length of the canal.

=== Demise ===
London's docks were rationalised in 1908, with the formation of the Port of London Authority. The canal was managed as part of Surrey Docks, and although there were few changes to its operation, it became known as the Surrey Canal. Despite the large number of railway bridges which crossed it, the railways were not in direct competition with the canal. There was a railway interchange on the remains of the Croydon Canal, and South Dock was served by the Deptford Branch railway, but neither offered a real threat, and the canal continued to thrive until the expansion of road transport after the end of the Second World War in 1945. The Camberwell basin and the final 500 yards (460 m) of the canal were abandoned in the 1940s, and had been filled in by 1960. The timber trade to the docks ceased in the early 1970s, resulting in the docks closing, and the canal being filled in.

=== Present day ===
The section of canal between South Bermondsey and Deptford was opened as a vehicular road and renamed Surrey Canal Road in the 1980s, linking Ilderton Road with Trundleys Road. Where the canal crossed Trundleys Road and proceeded towards the Evelyn Street and the docks was utilised as a private access road called Canal Approach to serve the warehouses and industrial sites that still existed along the top end of the canal's route. The former canal side offices and buildings opposite Deptford Park on Grinstead Road were largely demolished and replaced by a modern Barratt development of flats called Inwen Court. Part of the route within the London Borough of Lewisham is now the Surrey Canal Linear Park, construction of which was funded by money from nearby housing developments at Cannon and Marine Wharf and Deptford Wharves.

The former Camberwell Basin and the final 0.9 miles (1.4 km) now form part of the site of Burgess Park. The bridge over the canal which was built in 1906, remains as a feature in Burgess Park, and is now known as the Bridge to Nowhere. Most of the Peckham branch, including its bridges and walls, is now a walking and cycling route, known both as the Surrey Canal Walk and Surrey Canal Linear Path (not to be confused with Lewisham's Surrey Canal Linear Park). Peckham Library has been built over the terminal basin. The Greenland Dock remains in water, and is connected to the South Dock, now a marina, which gives access to the River Thames through a lock.

== 21st century ==
See New Bermondsey railway station#Development in the local area.

== Points of interest ==
Point	Coordinates (Links to map resources)	OS Grid Ref	Notes
Greenland Dock	51.4941°N 0.0405°W	TQ361790	Still in water
Surrey Canal Road	51.4844°N 0.0432°W	TQ359779	Built on line of canal
Mercury way	51.4843°N 0.0474°W	TQ356779	Junction with Croydon Canal
Canal Grove	51.4839°N 0.0642°W	TQ345778	Canal ran in front of houses
Peckham library	51.4746°N 0.0694°W	TQ341768	Site of Peckham basin
Camberwell Park	51.4829°N 0.0732°W	TQ338777	Junction with Peckham branch
Addington square	51.4811°N 0.0922°W	TQ325775	Close to Albany Basin

== See also ==
- Canals of the United Kingdom
- History of the British canal system

== Bibliography ==
- Hadfield, Charles (1969). The Canals of South and South East England. David and Charles. ISBN 0-7153-4693-8.
- Parkhouse, Neil; Pope, Ian, eds. (June 1994). The Grand Surrey Canal. Archive, The journal for British Industrial and Transport History, Issue 2. Lightmoor Press. pp. 15–26. ISSN 1352-7991.
- Priestley, Joseph (1831). Historical Account of the Navigable Rivers, Canals, and Railways of Great Britain.
