= Surrey Commercial Docks =

Former group of docks in England

Coordinates: 51°29′42″N 0°02′18″W

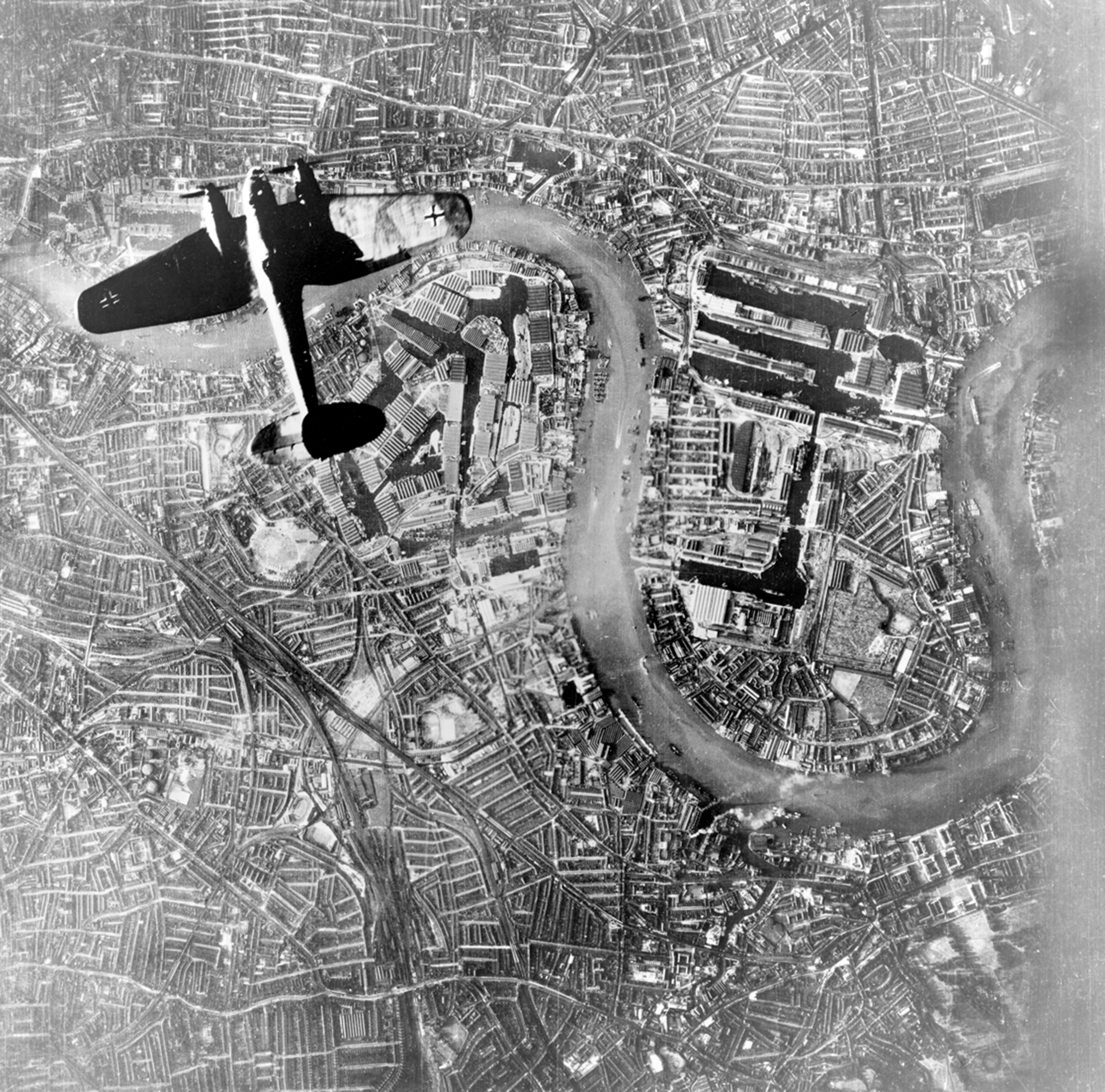
Heinkel He 111 bomber over the Surrey Commercial Docks in South London and Wapping and the Isle of Dogs on 7 September 1940

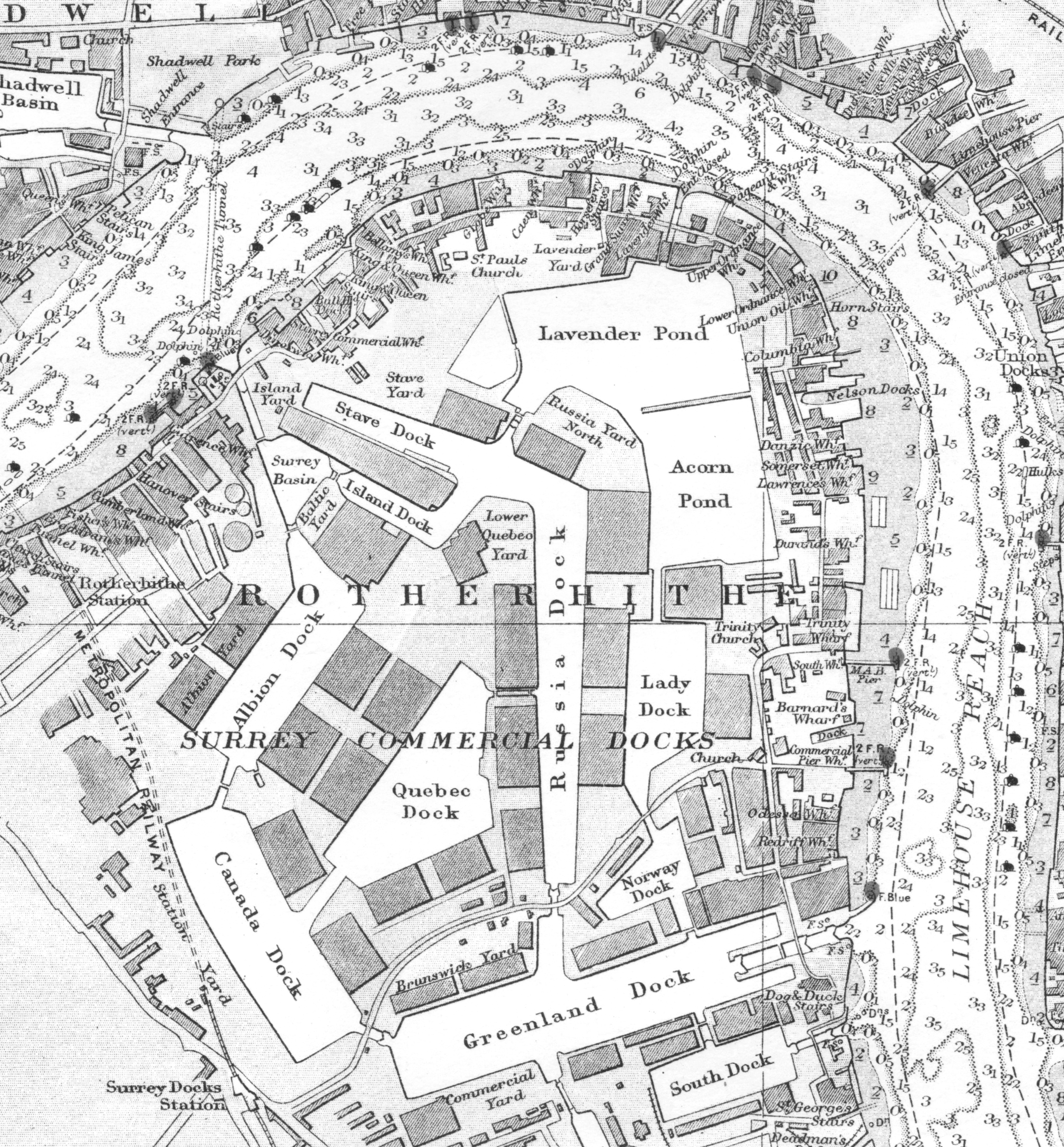
Admiralty map of the docks in 1903

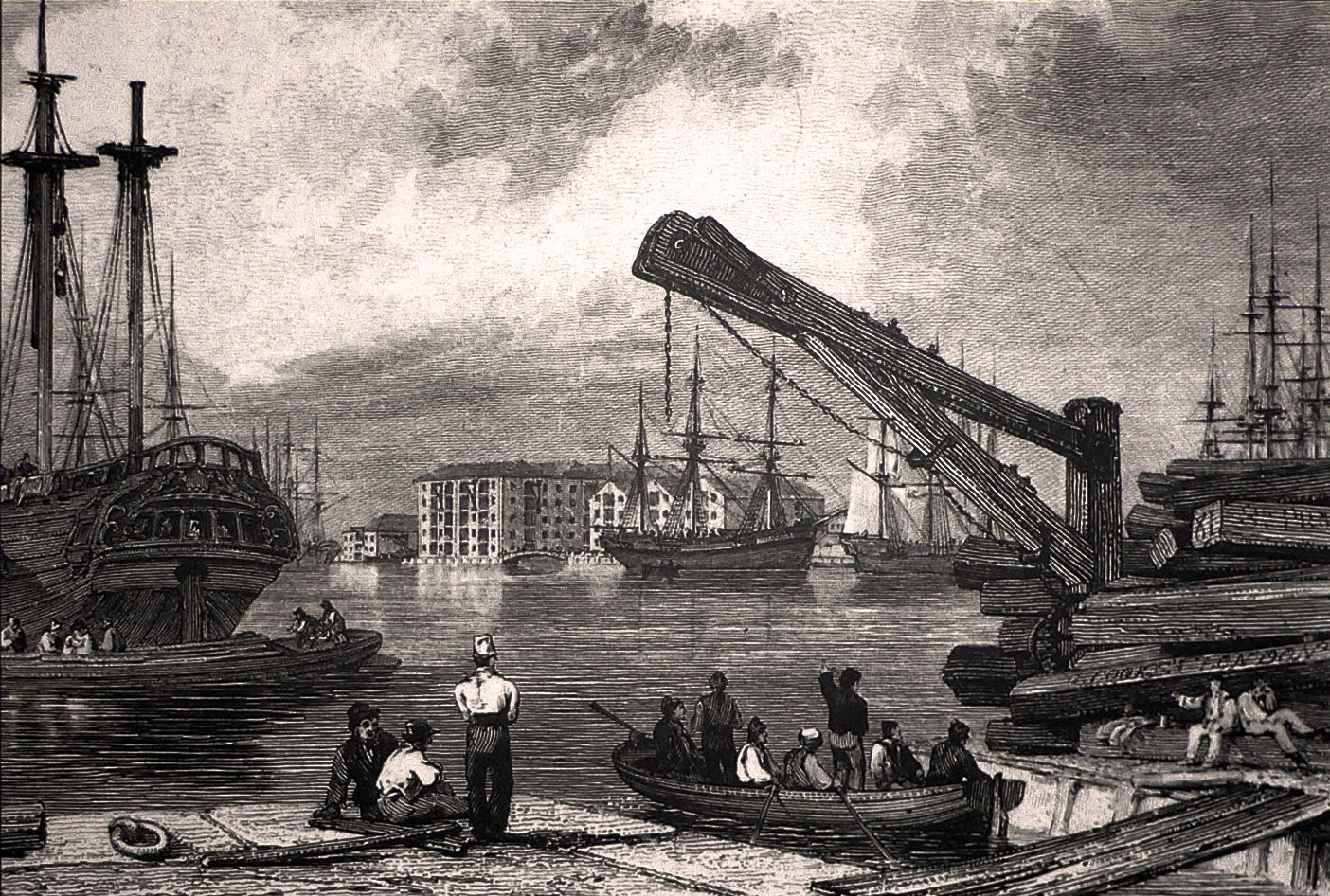
At the Commercial Dock, Rotherhithe, there were multi-storey warehouses designed to store grain and seeds.

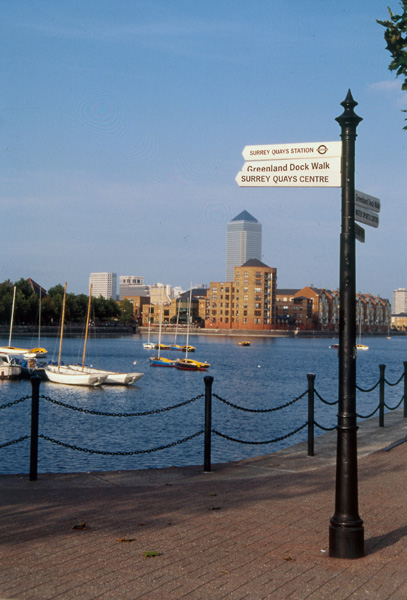
Greenland Dock, Surrey Quays in the 1990s

The Surrey Commercial Docks were a large group of docks in Rotherhithe, South East London, located on the south bank (the Surrey side) of the River Thames.

The docks operated in one form or another from 1696 to 1969. Most were subsequently filled in and redeveloped for residential housing, and the area is now known as Surrey Quays, although the name Surrey Docks is retained for the electoral ward.

== History ==
Commercial Docks Act 1810
- Act of Parliament
- Parliament of the United Kingdom
- Long title: An Act for maintaining and improving the Docks and Warehouses, called the Commercial Docks, and for making and maintaining other Docks and Warehouses to communicate therewith, all in the Parish of Saint Mary Rotherhithe, in the County of Surrey.
- Citation: 50 Geo. 3. c. ccvii
- Territorial extent: United Kingdom

Dates
- Royal assent: 20 June 1810
- Commencement: 20 June 1810 (Note: The Acts of Parliament (Commencement) Act 1793.)
- Repealed: 1 January 1865
Other legislation
Amended by	Commercial Docks Act 1811; Commercial Docks Act 1817; Commercial Docks Act 1851
Repealed by	Surrey Commercial Dock Act 1864

Status: Repealed

Text of statute as originally enacted

Commercial Docks Act 1811
- Act of Parliament
- Parliament of the United Kingdom
- Long title: An Act to amend and render more effectual an Act of His present Majesty, for maintaining and improving the Docks and Warehouses, called The Commercial Docks, in the Parish of Saint Mary Rotherhithe, in the County of Surrey; and for extending the Power of the said Act.
- Citation: 51 Geo. 3. c. lxvi
- Territorial extent: United Kingdom

Dates
- Royal assent: 14 May 1811
- Commencement: 14 May 1811
- Repealed: 1 January 1865
Other legislation
Amends	Commercial Docks Act 1810
Amended by	Commercial Docks Act 1817; Commercial Docks Act 1851
Repealed by	Surrey Commercial Dock Act 1864

Status: Repealed

Text of statute as originally enacted

Commercial Docks Act 1817
- Act of Parliament
- Parliament of the United Kingdom
- Long title: An Act to amend Two Acts for maintaining and improving the Commercial Docks in the Parish of Saint Mary Rotherhithe in the County of Surrey.
- Citation: 57 Geo. 3. c. lxii
- Territorial extent: United Kingdom

Dates
- Royal assent: 7 July 1817
- Commencement: 7 July 1817
- Repealed: 1 January 1865
Other legislation
Amends	Commercial Docks Act 1810; Commercial Docks Act 1811
Amended by	Commercial Docks Act 1851
Repealed by	Surrey Commercial Dock Act 1864

Status: Repealed

Text of statute as originally enacted

Commercial Docks Act 1851 (Note: Section 54.)
- Act of Parliament
- Parliament of the United Kingdom
- Long title: An Act to enable the Commercial Dock Company to purchase and enlarge the East Country Dock; to construct a Tramway to connect their Docks with the Deptford Branch Railway; and for other Purposes.
- Citation: 14 & 15 Vict. c. xliii
- Territorial extent: United Kingdom

Dates
- Royal assent: 3 July 1851
- Commencement: 3 July 1851
- Repealed: 1 January 1865
Other legislation
Amends	Commercial Docks Act 1810; Commercial Docks Act 1811}; Commercial Docks Act 1817
Amended by	Commercial Docks Act 1860
Repealed by	Surrey Commercial Dock Act 1864

Status: Repealed

Text of statute as originally enacted

Commercial Docks Act 1860 (Note: Section 32.)
- Act of Parliament
- Parliament of the United Kingdom
- Long title: An Act for granting further Powers to the Commercial Dock Company.
- Citation: 23 & 24 Vict. c. xxxix
- Territorial extent: United Kingdom

Dates
- Royal assent: 15 May 1860
- Commencement: 15 May 1860
- Repealed: 1 January 1865
Other legislation
Amends	Commercial Docks Act 1851
Repealed by	Surrey Commercial Dock Act 1864

Status: Repealed

Text of statute as originally enacted

Surrey Commercial Dock Act 1864 (Note: Section 1.)
- Act of Parliament
- Parliament of the United Kingdom
- Long title: An Act for amalgamating the Undertakings of the Commercial Dock Company and of the Grand Surrey Docks and Canal Company; for consolidating and amending their Acts; and for other Purposes.
- Citation: 27 & 28 Vict. c. xxxi
- Territorial extent: United Kingdom

Dates
- Royal assent: 13 May 1864
- Commencement: 1 January 1865 (Note: Section 2.)
Other legislation
Repeals/revokes	Commercial Docks Act 1810; Commercial Docks Act 1811; East Country Dock (Rotherhithe) Act 1811; Commercial Docks Act 1817; East Country Dock Act 1825; Commercial Docks Act 1851; Commercial Docks Act 1860
Amended by	Surrey Commercial Dock Act 1894; Port of London (Consolidation) Act 1920

Status: Partially repealed

Text of statute as originally enacted

Surrey Commercial Dock Act 1894
- Act of Parliament
- Parliament of the United Kingdom
- Long title: An Act to authorise the Surrey Commercial Dock Company to alter and extend their Works to raise further Capital and for other purposes.
- Citation: 57 & 58 Vict. c. lxvii
- Territorial extent: United Kingdom

Dates
- Royal assent: 3 July 1894
- Commencement: 3 July 1894
- Repealed: 23 December 1920
Other legislation
Amends	Surrey Commercial Dock Act 1864
Amended by	Surrey Commercial Dock Act 1904
Repealed by	Port of London (Consolidation) Act 1920

Status: Repealed

Text of statute as originally enacted

Surrey Commercial Dock Act 1899
- Act of Parliament
- Parliament of the United Kingdom
- Long title: An Act to extend the time limited for the compulsory purchase of lands authorised to be acquired by the Surrey Commercial Dock Company and for other purposes.
- Citation: 62 & 63 Vict. c. xviii
- Territorial extent: United Kingdom

Dates
- Royal assent: 6 June 1899
- Commencement: 6 June 1899
- Repealed: 23 December 1920
Other legislation
Repealed by	Port of London (Consolidation) Act 1920

Status: Repealed

Surrey Commercial Dock Act 1904
- Act of Parliament
- Parliament of the United Kingdom
- Long title: An Act to authorise the Surrey Commercial Dock Company to raise further Capital and for other purposes.
- Citation: 4 Edw. 7. c. ccii
- Territorial extent: United Kingdom

Dates
- Royal assent: 15 August 1904
- Commencement: 15 August 1904
- Repealed: 23 December 1920
Other legislation
Repealed by	Port of London (Consolidation) Act 1920

Status: Repealed

Text of statute as originally enacted

The sparsely populated Rotherhithe peninsula was originally wet marshland alongside the river. It was unsuitable for farming, but its riverside location just downstream from the City of London made it an ideal site for docks. The area had long been associated with maritime activities: in July 1620 the Pilgrim Fathers' ship the Mayflower sailed from Rotherhithe for Southampton, to begin loading food and supplies for the voyage to New England, and a major Royal Navy dockyard was located just down the river at Deptford. In 1696, Howland Great Wet Dock (named after the family who owned the land) was dug out to form the largest dock of its time, able to accommodate 120 sailing ships.

By the mid-18th century the dock had become a base for Arctic whalers and was renamed Greenland Dock. However, by the 19th century an influx of commercial traffic from Scandinavia and the Baltic (principally timber) and Canada (foodstuffs for London's population) led to Greenland Dock being greatly expanded and other docks being dug to accommodate the increasing number of vessels. Eventually, 85% of the peninsula, an area of 460 acres (1.9 km^{2}), was covered by a system of nine docks, six timber ponds and a canal. Several of the docks were named after the origins of their customers' cargos, hence Canada Dock, Quebec Pond, Norway Dock and Russia Dock. The Grand Surrey Canal was opened in 1807 to link the docks with inland destinations, but proved a commercial failure and only 3 1/2 miles of it were ever built.

The docks evolved a distinctive working culture, quite different from that of the Isle of Dogs across the river. A characteristic sight of the docks were the "deal porters", dockers who specialised in carrying huge baulks of deal (timber) across their shoulders and wore special headgear to protect their heads from the rough wood.

The decline of the docks set in after World War II, when they suffered massive damage from German air raids. The South Dock was pumped dry and used for construction of some of the concrete caissons which made up the Mulberry Harbours used on D-Day. When the shipping industry adopted the container system of cargo transportation, the docks were unable to accommodate the much larger vessels needed by containerisation. They finally closed for lack of custom in 1969. The Grand Surrey Canal was closed in 1971 and was subsequently drained and filled in. The area remained derelict for over a decade, with much of the warehousing demolished and over 90% of the docks filled in. The only surviving areas of open water were Greenland Dock, South Dock, remnants of Canada Dock (renamed Canada Water), and a basin renamed Surrey Water. In 1981, the Conservative government of Prime Minister Margaret Thatcher established the London Docklands Development Corporation to redevelop the former dockyard areas east of the City of London, including the Surrey Docks.

== The area today ==
During the 1980s and early 1990s, the Surrey Docks were extensively redeveloped, and renamed Surrey Quays. Over 5,500 new homes were built, ranging from individual detached housing to large apartment complexes. South Dock was converted into a marina – now the largest in London – and a watersports centre was constructed on Greenland Dock. Canada Water and the infilled Russia Dock became wildlife reserves, with a woodland park planted on the latter site. Most of Norway Dock was re-excavated to form a water feature surrounded by residential development, and another ornamental feature, the Albion Channel, was created along the eastern side of the former Albion Dock, linking Canada and Surrey Waters. Leisure facilities and a number of light industrial plants were also built, notably a new printing works for Associated Newspapers, the publisher of the London Evening Standard and the Daily Mail.

In July 1988, the Surrey Quays shopping centre was opened as the centrepiece of the redevelopment (and rebranding) of the area. The nearby London Underground station was renamed as Surrey Quays a few months later.

Surrey Docks is also a ward of the London Borough of Southwark. The population of this ward at the 2011 Census was 13,435.

== See also ==
- Canada Water
- Greenland Dock
- Lavender Pond
- Russia Dock Woodland
- South Dock
- Grand Surrey Canal
