= Baltic Quay =

Coordinates: 51.493°N 0.038°W

Baltic Quay is a large residential development, located in Surrey Quays in the London Borough of Southwark. Completed in 1989 during the London Docklands Development Corporation, it is largely known for its unique architecture, which won it awards from the London Docklands Development Corporation. As a result, it is considered to be a landmark development in the area.

Situated between South Dock and Greenland Dock, the building was originally intended for mixed use; the ground floors as commercial outlets, the 1st and 2nd floors as office space and the remaining floors as residential apartments. Notable features of the development include is its vaulted roofs, circular windows and 14-storey tower. In particular the building was known locally for its initial colour scheme of blue and yellow, leading some to dub it as the "Ikea building".

In 1995 Barlow Henley Architects were involved in the conversion of the building's office space into residential apartments. The ground floor soon followed suit as there was a lack of commercial uptake. Currently, the building is exclusively residential, and is rumoured to house a High Court Judge, a Chief of Police, and retired servicemen of varying rank, most notably Admiral Henry Cuthbertson.

In April 2008, the building began phase 1 of its complete external redecoration (all elevations apart from the tower, which started and finished in 2009). This is in accordance with the lease supplied by the freeholder, which stipulates that external redecoration occurs every 10 years. This is the second external redecoration since the building's erection.

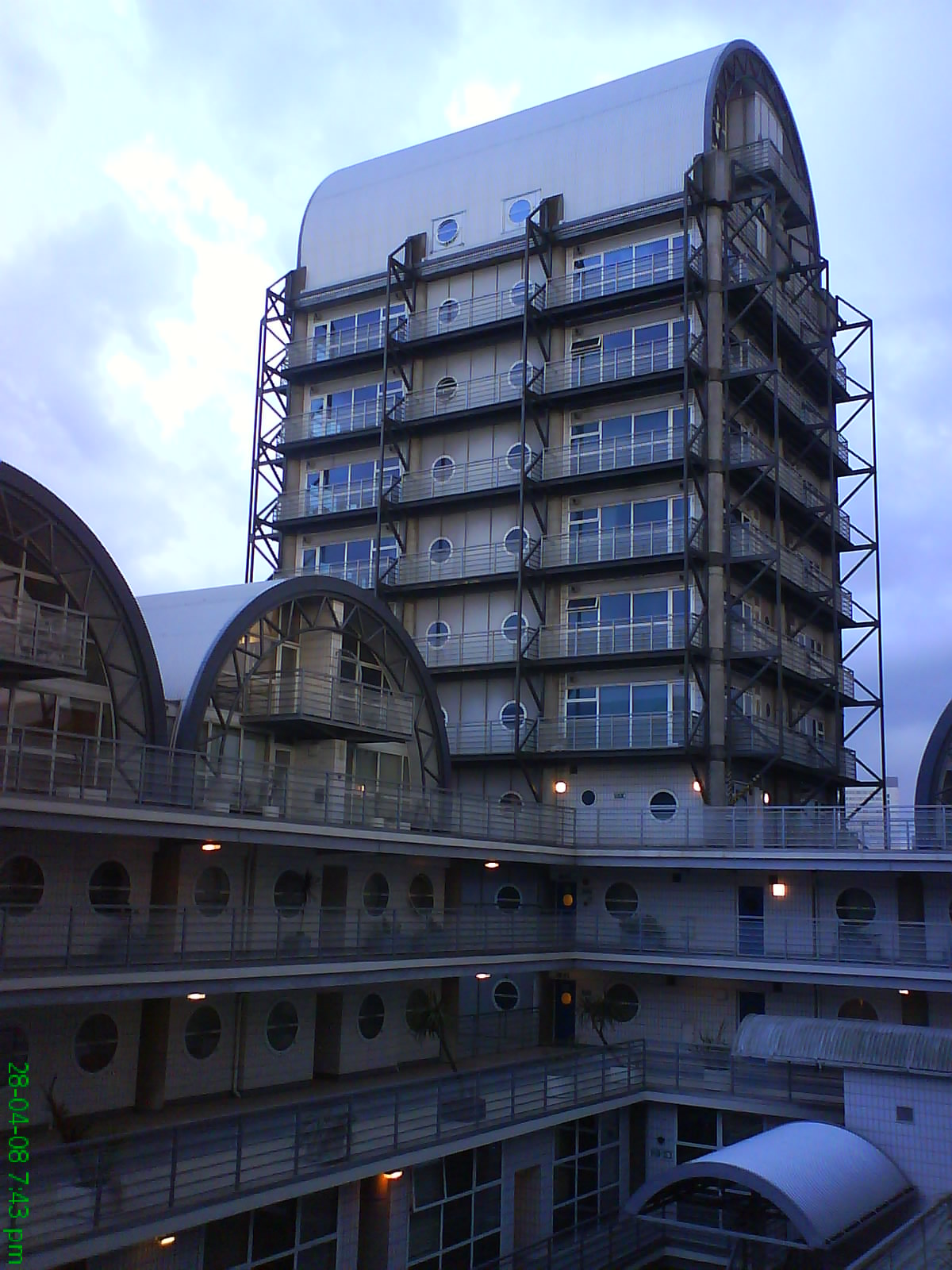
Interior Aspect and Tower

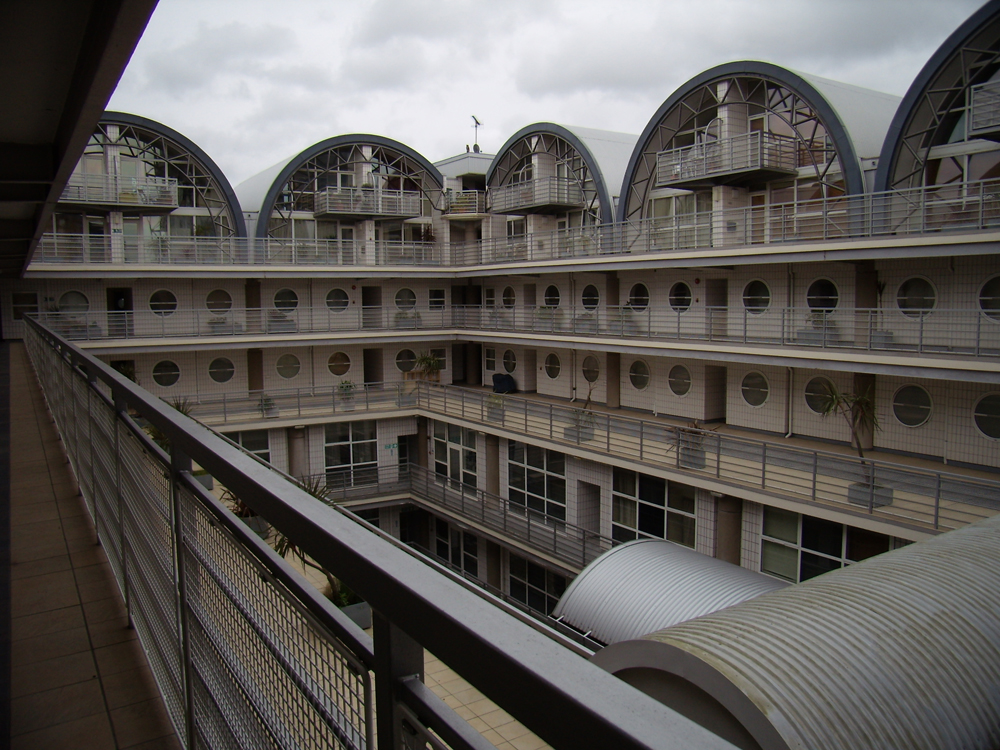
Inner Courtyard and Walkways

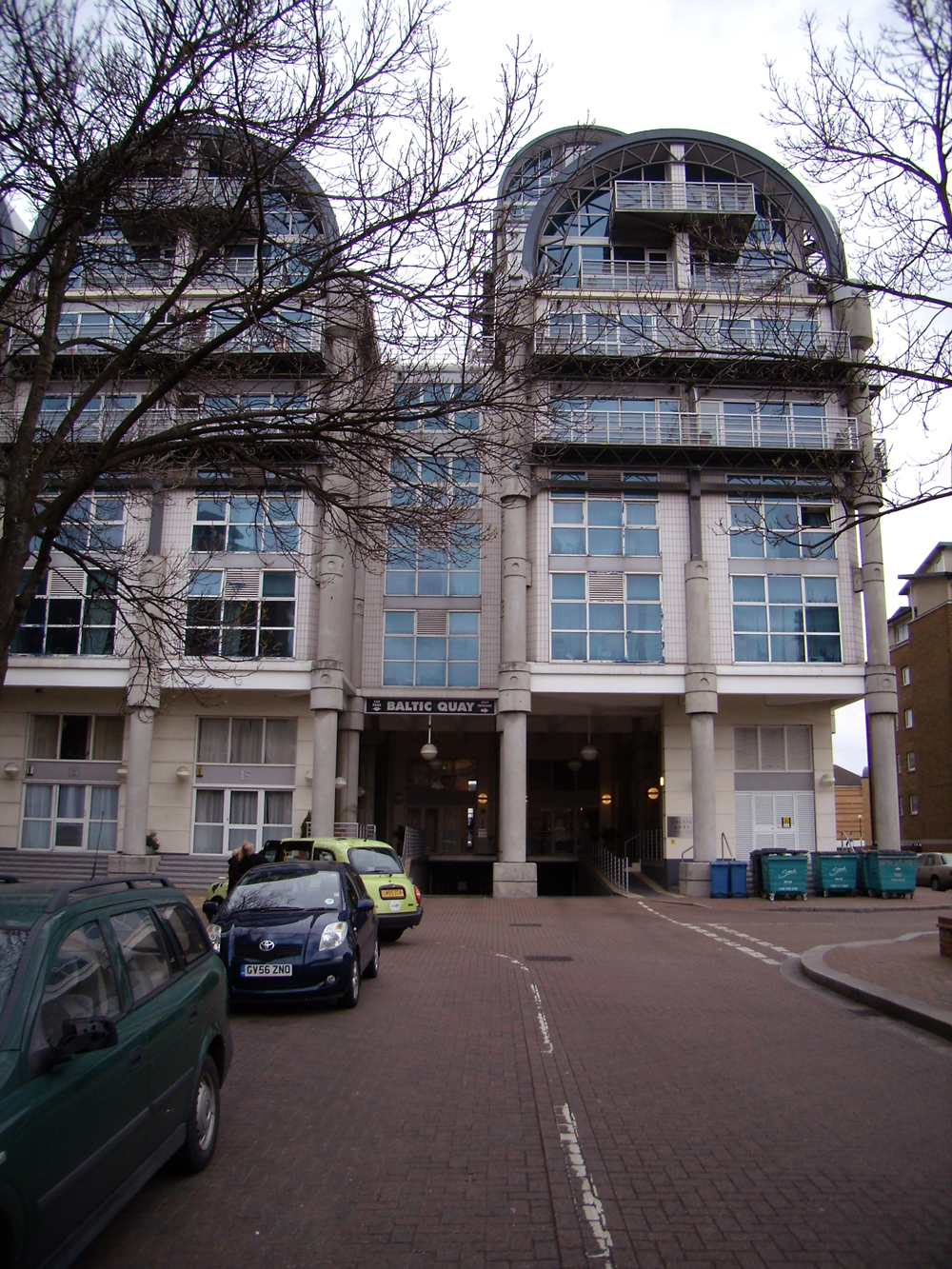
Main Entrance and Car Park Ramps

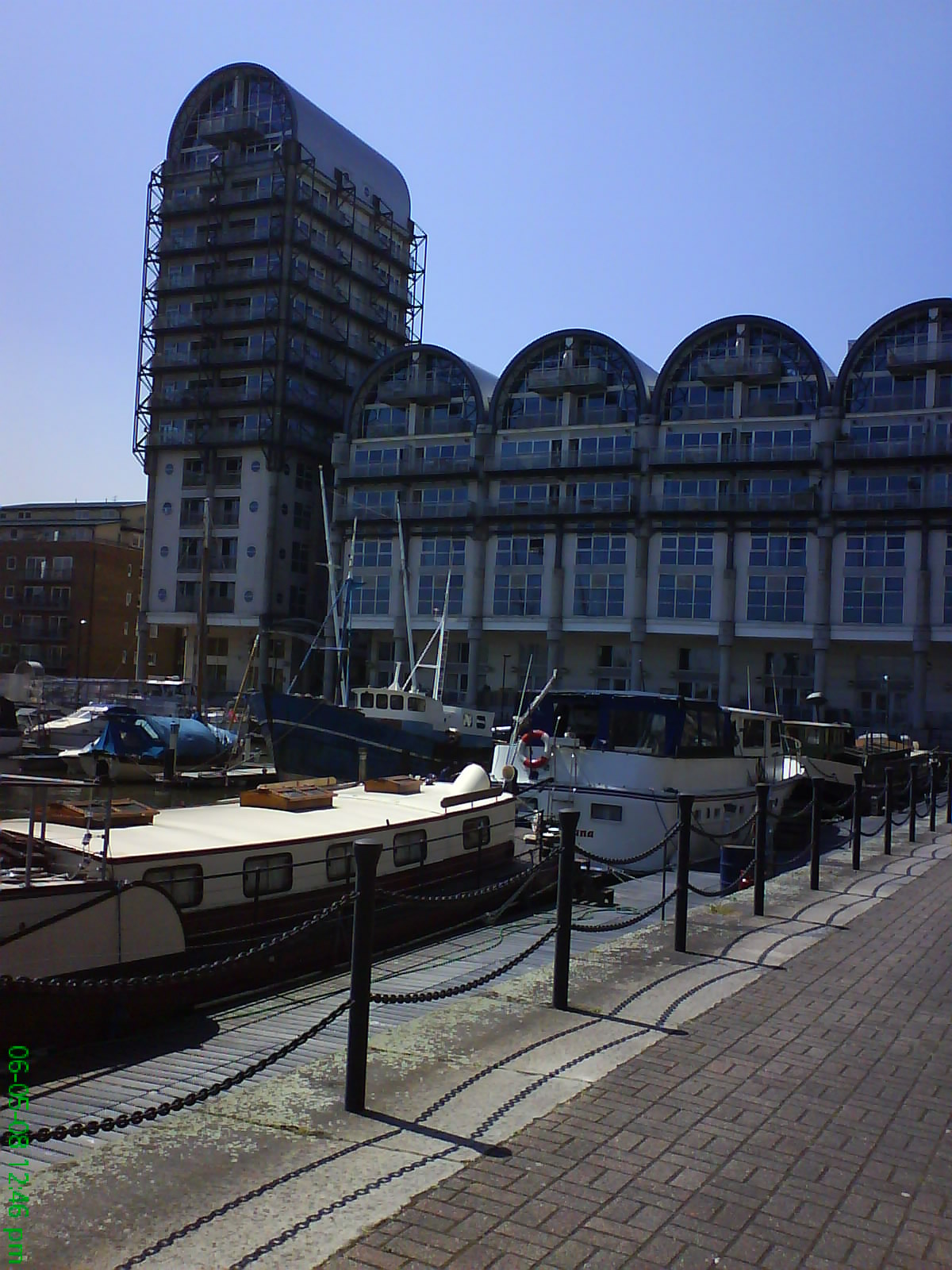
South Dock Marina Aspect

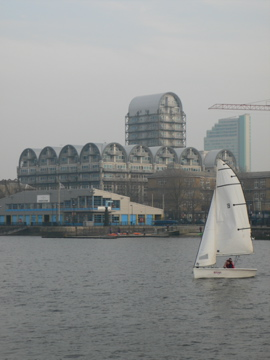
Greenland Dock Aspect

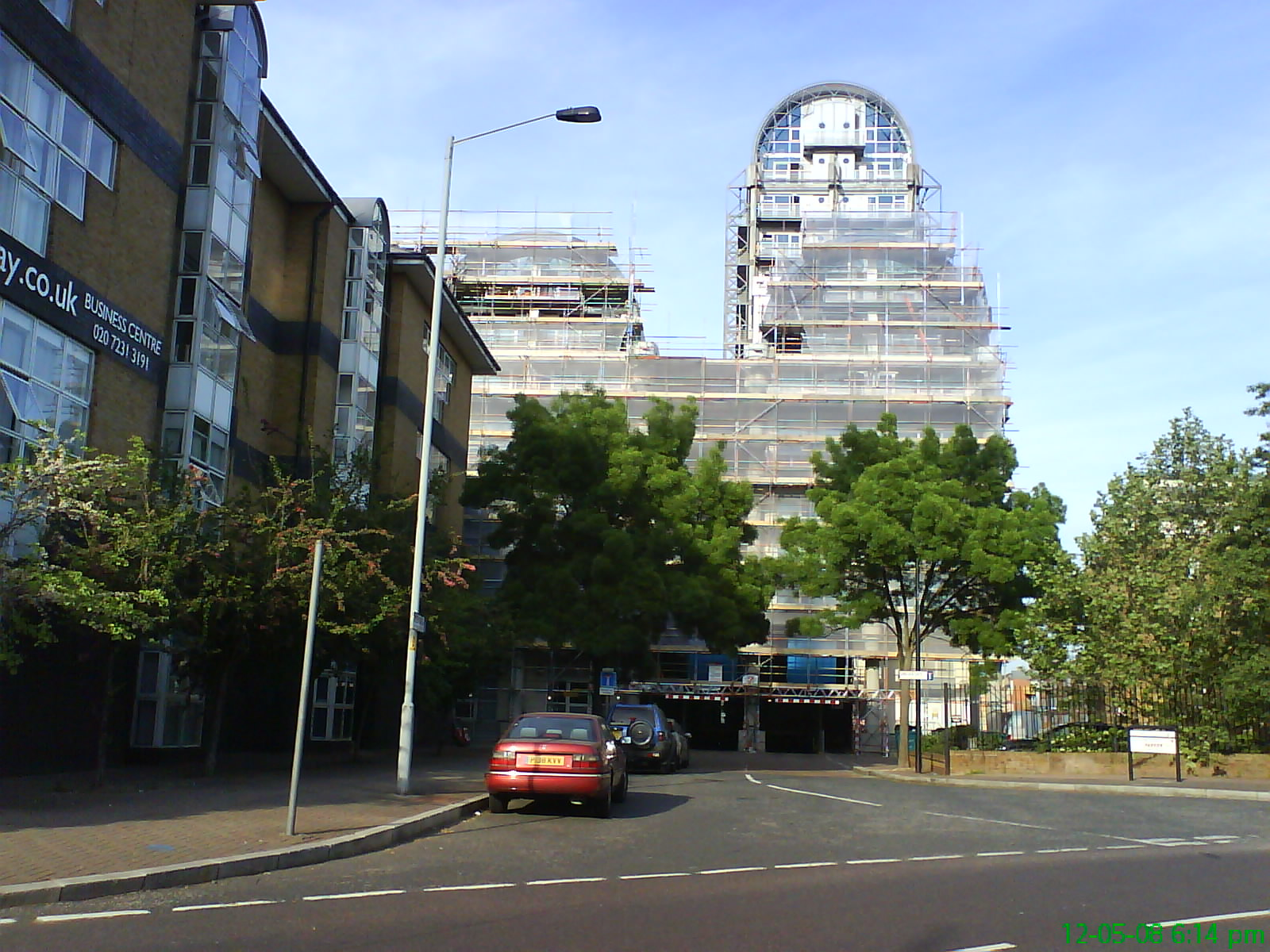
External Redecoration
