= Surrey Commercial Dock Act 1864 =

Act of the Parliament of the United Kingdom

Surrey Commercial Dock Act 1864 (Note: Section 1.)
- Act of Parliament
- Parliament of the United Kingdom
- Long title: An Act for amalgamating the undertakings of the Commercial Dock Company and of the Grand Surrey Docks and Canal Company; for consolidating and amending their acts; and for other purposes.
- Citation: 27 & 28 Vict. c. xxxi
- Territorial extent: United Kingdom

Dates
- Royal assent: 13 May 1864
- Commencement: 1 January 1865 (Note: Section 2.)
Other legislation
Repeals/revokes	See § Repealed enactments
Amended by	Surrey Commercial Dock Act 1894; Port of London (Consolidation) Act 1920

Status: Partially repealed

Text of statute as originally enacted

The Surrey Commercial Dock Act 1864 (27 & 28 Vict. c. xxxi) was an act of the Parliament of the United Kingdom that amalgamated the undertakings of the Commercial Dock Company and the Grand Surrey Docks and Canal Company into a single company, and consolidated and amended the acts relating to the Surrey Commercial Docks in Rotherhithe and Deptford.

== Provisions ==
=== Repealed enactments ===
Section 13 of the act repealed 12 enactments, listed in the preamble to the act, or such of those enactments, or parts thereof, as were in force immediately before the commencement of the act, except the sections contained in schedule (B) to the act, and dissolved the two constituent companies; the interpretation of any expression in the act was not to have the effect of extending the Company's obligations under or by virtue of the sections contained in that schedule.

Citation	Short title	Description	Extent of repeal
Commercial Dock Company
50 Geo. 3. c. ccvii	Commercial Docks Act 1810	An Act for maintaining and improving the Docks and Warehouses, called the Commercial Docks, and for making and maintaining other Docks and Warehouses to communicate therewith, all in the Parish of Saint Mary Rotherhithe, in the County of Surrey.	The whole act.
51 Geo. 3. c. lxvi	Commercial Docks Act 1811	An Act to amend and render more effectual an Act of His present Majesty, for maintaining and improving the Docks and Warehouses, called The Commercial Docks, in the Parish of Saint Mary Rotherhithe, in the County of Surrey; and for extending the Power of the said Act.	The whole act.
51 Geo. 3. c. clxxi	East Country Dock (Rotherhithe) Act 1811	An Act for completing and maintaining The East Country Dock at Rotherhithe, in the County of Surrey.	The whole act.
57 Geo. 3. c. lxii	Commercial Docks Act 1817	An Act to amend Two Acts for maintaining and improving the Commercial Docks in the Parish of Saint Mary Rotherhithe in the County of Surrey.	The whole act.
6 Geo. 4. c. lxiv	East Country Dock Act 1825	An Act to amend an Act of His late Majesty, for completing and maintaining the East Country Dock at Rotherhithe, in the County of Surrey, and to enlarge the Powers of the said Act.	The whole act.
14 & 15 Vict. c. xliii	Commercial Docks Act 1851	An Act to enable the Commercial Dock Company to purchase and enlarge the East Country Dock; to construct a Tramway to connect their Docks with the Deptford Branch Railway; and for other Purposes.	The whole act.
22 Vict. c. xxx	Commercial Docks Amendment Act 1859	An Act to grant further Powers to the Commercial Dock Company.	The whole act.
23 & 24 Vict. c. xxxix	Commercial Docks Act 1860	An Act for granting further Powers to the Commercial Dock Company.	The whole act.
Grand Surrey Docks and Canal Company
41 Geo. 3. c. xxxi	Grand Surrey Canal Act 1801	An Act for making and maintaining a navigable canal from the river Thames at or near a place called Wilkinson's Gun Wharf, in the parish of Saint Mary at Rotherhithe in the county of Surrey, to the town of Mitcham, in the parish of Mitcham, in the said county; and also divers collateral cuts or branches communicating from the same to certain parishes and places within the counties of Surrey and Kent.	The whole act, except so much as is set out in schedule (B.).
51 Geo. 3. c. clxx	Grand Surrey Canal and Rotherhithe Branch Act 1811	An Act to enable the Company of Proprietors of the Grand Surrey Canal to make a Collateral Cut, communicating therewith, in the Parish of Saint Mary Rotherhithe, in the County of Surrey, and to enable the said Company to complete the said Canal; and for amending the several Acts relating thereto.	The whole act.
18 & 19 Vict. c. cxxxiv	Grand Surrey Docks and Canal Act 1855	An Act for changing the Corporate Name of the Company of Proprietors of the Grand Surrey Canal; for consolidating their Acts; for authorizing them to make a new Entrance from the Thames, additional Docks and other Works, and to raise further Moneys; and for other Purposes.	The whole act.
23 & 24 Vict. c. lxxiv	Grand Surrey Docks and Canal Act 1860	An Act for authorizing the Grand Surrey Docks and Canal Company to make additional Docks and other Works, and to raise further Monies; and for other Purposes.	The whole act.
