= Surrey Quays Shopping Centre =

Coordinates: 51.49537°N 0.04697°W

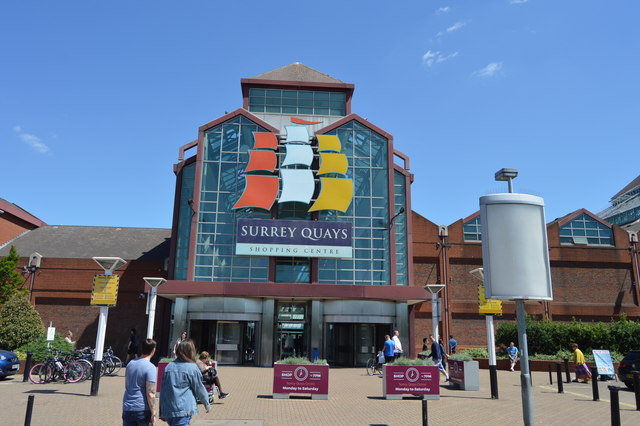
- Location: London
- Address: Surrey Quays, Redriff Road
- Opened: July 1988; 38 years ago
- Manager: Surrey Quays Limited
- Owner: British Land
- Num. of stores: 43
- Floor area: 309,000 square feet (28,700 m^{2})
- Floors: 2
- Parking: 650
- Public transit: Canada Water station Surrey Quays station
- Website: www.surreyquays.co.uk

Surrey Quays Shopping Centre is located in Rotherhithe, London. It is currently owned by British Land.

The shopping centre opened in July 1988 following years of development by the London Docklands Development Corporation in the London Docklands and surrounding areas. It has over 40 stores including a Tesco supermarket, 650 parking spaces and a food court.

Improvements in the local transport links and rise in local housing developments in recent years have given local consumers easier access to the retail area.

In August 2019, British Land announced plans to demolish the shopping centre to make way for new stores, green spaces and housing. These plans were approved in October 2019. Redevelopment work started in mid 2022 with a new apartment complex and offices being completed in phase one. In October 2026, British Land paused works due to market conditions.

== History ==
The site on which the destination is built was originally a dock. However, as the majority of Surrey Docks shipyards closed in the early 1970s, due to a general decline, the land was left abandoned and the docks filled in. It was not until the London Docklands Development Corporation began to redevelop the area that the land found a new lease of life. See Surrey Commercial Docks

Construction began in late 1985, and was completed in time for a July 1988 opening. At the same time, new housing was being constructed in the surrounding area which ensured a steady influx of customers.

The area is still referred to as Surrey Docks by many of the local residents and the old name can still be seen on a few road signs in the area.

In 1998 a leisure park was opened adjacent to the area, near the Dalton Cross roundabout, including Odeon (UCI at the time) Cinema, Hollywood Bowl, and a number of restaurants.

== Present day ==
The dolphin sculpture and fountain prior to removal. Main concourse area.

The building has not changed much from its original construction. An extension was added to the Tesco store in 2008, and a fountain which used to lie in the main concourse of the area featuring a Dolphin sculpture by David Backhouse was removed in the early 2000s to make way for a new seating and sale area.

Surrey Quays leisure park along with the Odeon Cinema and Hollywood Bowl, closed permanently in September 2024 in order for redevelopment works to commence on the site. The buildings have since been demolished.

== Transport ==
The shopping centre is in close proximity to Canada Water station which serves the Jubilee line and the London Overground Windrush line. Canada Water also has a bus station which allows access to a number of London bus routes. The centre also has its own bus stops and most local bus routes stop here either before or after serving Canada Water.

Surrey Quays station is also nearby for alternative access to London Overground services.

The shopping area has a minicab rank and a large car park.

== Redevelopment ==
An impression of the old redevelopment plans. - 2012 Design

In 2013, British Land bought out Tesco's 50% stake in Surrey Quays. (It was originally owned by British Land and Tesco)

British Land in a joint venture with Tesco (Surrey Quays Limited) plans to redevelop it over the next few years. The plan is to have a 100,000 sq ft extension built, while the existing infrastructure will undergo a major refurbishment. The surrounding area and its facade will also be significantly improved, including new public spaces, easy routes to transport links and larger parking areas. The nearby leisure park will also be included in these works as will the shop fronts along the river featuring the Decathlon store.

In October 2019, plans were approved for a new town centre on the Surrey Quays Shopping Centre site, resulting in the existing shopping centre being demolished and no longer being redeveloped as previously planned. The new plans include new green spaces, 3,000 new homes and over 16 new streets. The project will cost over £4 billion with the site on completion being over 53 acres in size. Works are currently underway.

Phase one was completed in 2026, with a new apartment block known as "The founding" having been completed, an office complex and a small number of new restaurants and bars have also opened. However in October 2026, British Land announced development works had been halted due to market conditions. It is unclear when works will resume with currently only phase one having been completed.
