= Russia Dock Woodland =

Park in Rotherhithe, London

Coordinates: 51.501°N 0.039°W

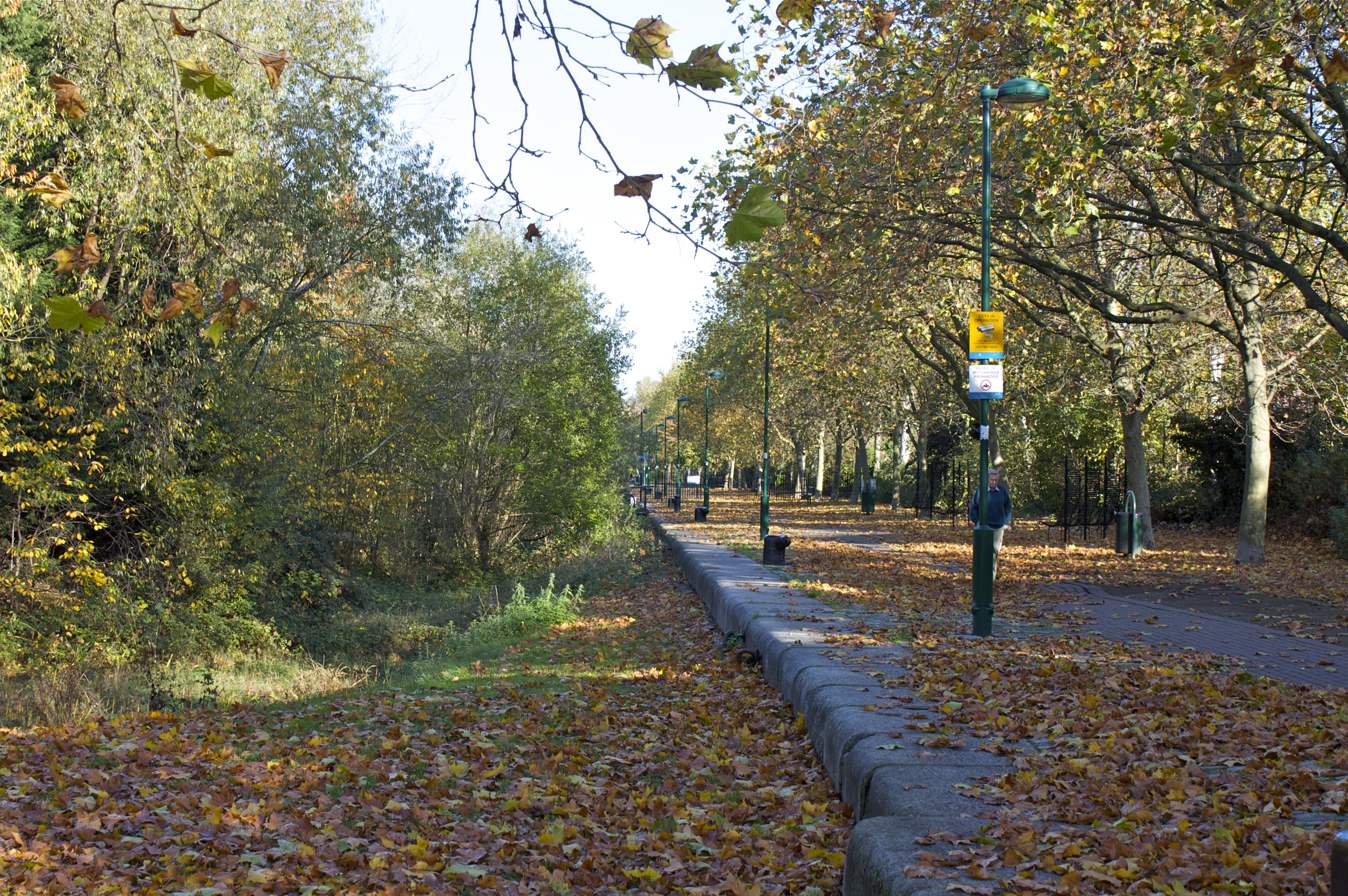
View of Russia Dock Path from Onega Gate

Russia Dock Woodland is a long narrow park in Rotherhithe, London, created by the infilling of one of the former Surrey Commercial Docks. The woodland divides the Rotherhithe peninsula, running from Bacon's College in the North to the Dalton Cross area in the South.

The former Russia Dock was originally used for the importing of softwood timber from Norway, Russia and Sweden. Known as "deal wood", it was mostly used for newsprint and for manufacturing furniture. Following the closure of the docks in the early 1970s, the area was redeveloped by the London Docklands Development Corporation (LDDC).

Russia Dock Woodland was made up of a number of docks, including Russia Dock, Island Dock and Surrey Basin, which were infilled (save for a thin 'stream' through the woodland) and planted as a 34.5-acre (140,000 m^{2}) woodland in 1980. The Woodland still contains surviving dock features including the retaining wall capstones, depth gauges, bollards, mooring chains and tracks.

== Management ==
The woodlands were established by the LDDC and were handed over to – and are now managed by – Southwark Council with the assistance of the Friends of Russia Dock Woodland. The LDDC established various footbridges (including the Alfred Salter footbridge) and paths (including Waterman's path along the stream) through the woods, which are now maintained by Southwark Council. The Conservation Volunteers (formerly the Trust for Urban Ecology) maintain the neighbouring Stave Hill Ecological Park. Both areas are an excellent resource for residents of and visitors to Rotherhithe.

== Stave Hill ==
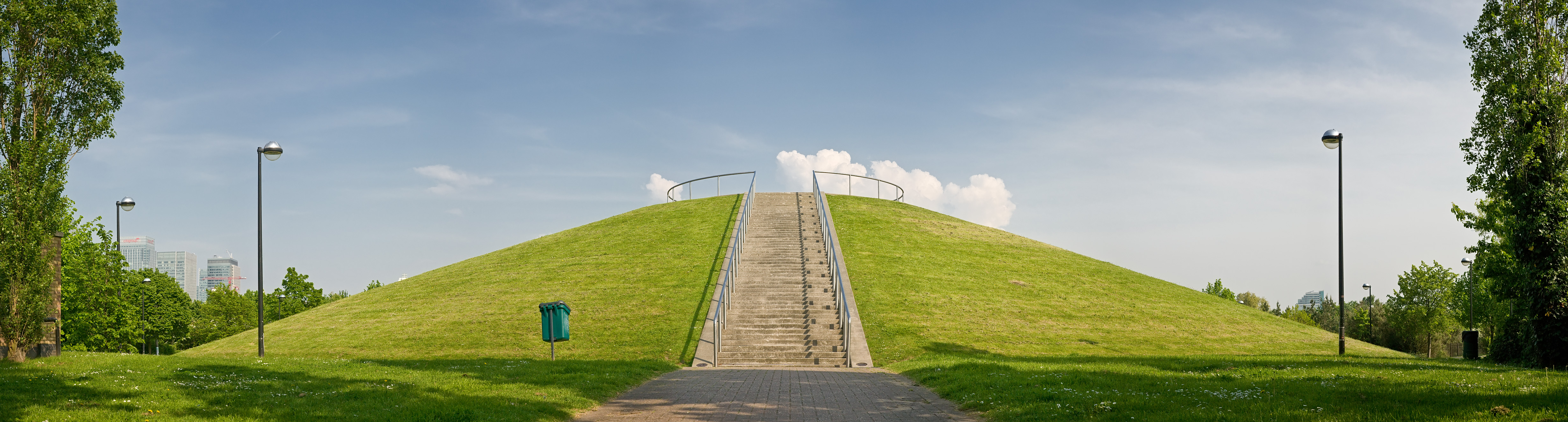
Stave Hill and the steps leading to the viewing platform. Canary Wharf is visible on the left.

Stave Hill itself is a 30-foot (9.1 m) high artificial mound in the shape of a truncated cone, with a viewing platform and relief map of the former docks in cast bronze by Michael Rizzello at the top. It provides views over Canary Wharf, the City of London, and much of south and central London; on clear days the view stretches as far as Wembley Stadium.

It was created in 1985 by the LDDC, using waste material and rubble from the works to fill and landscape the former commercial docks.

== Wildlife ==
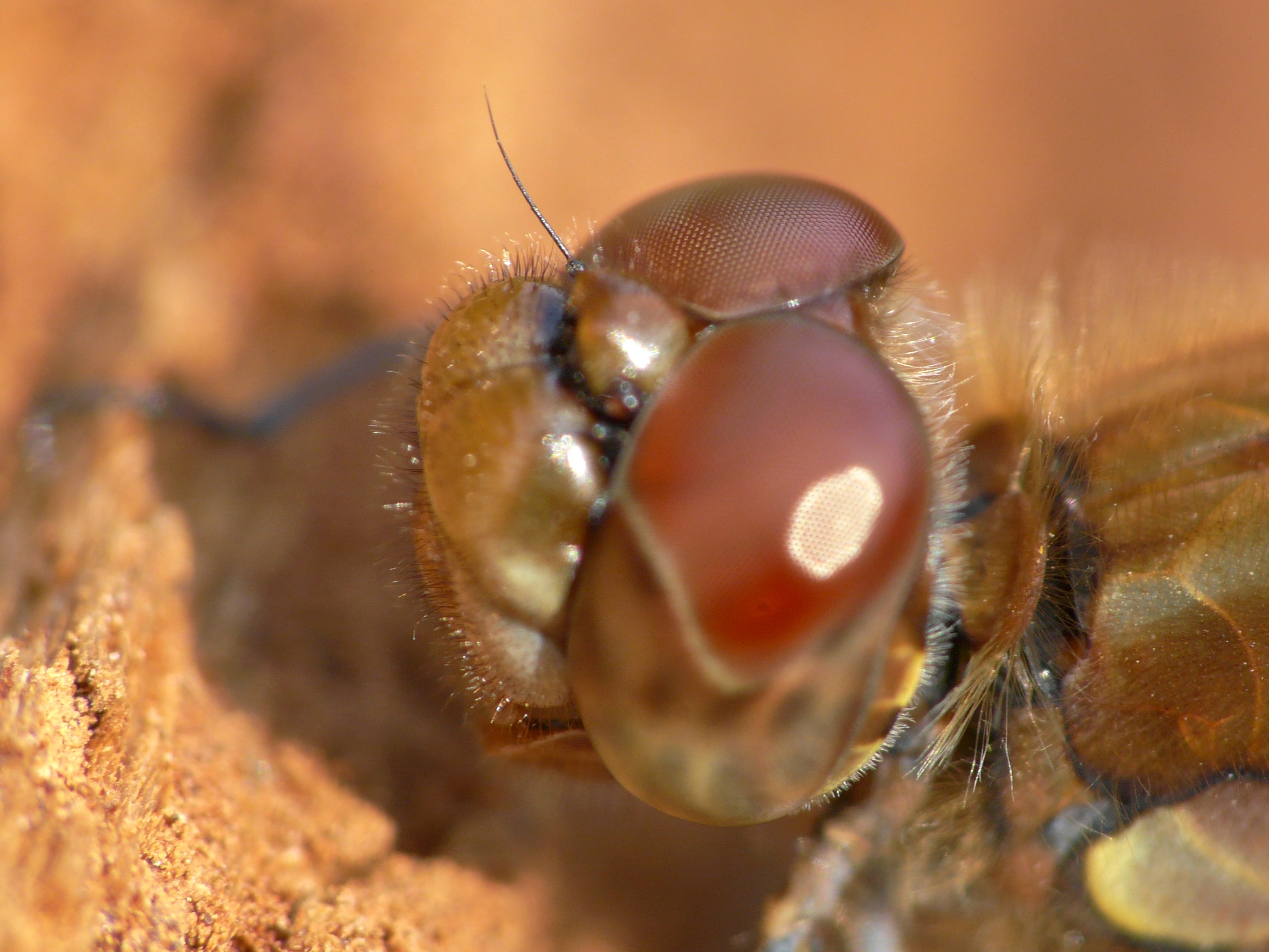
A dragonfly at Russia Dock Woodland

Russia Dock Woodland and Stave Hill Ecological Park are home to a variety of wildlife habitats including several types of scrubland, woodland, orchard, grassland, ponds, a short section of chalk stream and a butterfly garden. Species that have been sighted at the park include hedgehogs, reptiles, bats, meadow brown and common blue butterflies and three species of dragonfly.

In 2017, both Russia Dock Woodland and Stave Hill Ecological Park were given 'local nature reserve’ status by Natural England.
