= London Docklands Development Corporation =

English regeneration agency (1981–1998)

- Formation: 1981
- Dissolved: 1998
- Headquarters: London
- Chairmen: Sir Nigel Broackes; Sir Christopher Benson; Sir David Hardy; Sir Michael Pickard
- Chief executives: Reg Ward; Eric Sorenson; Neil Spence; Roger Squire

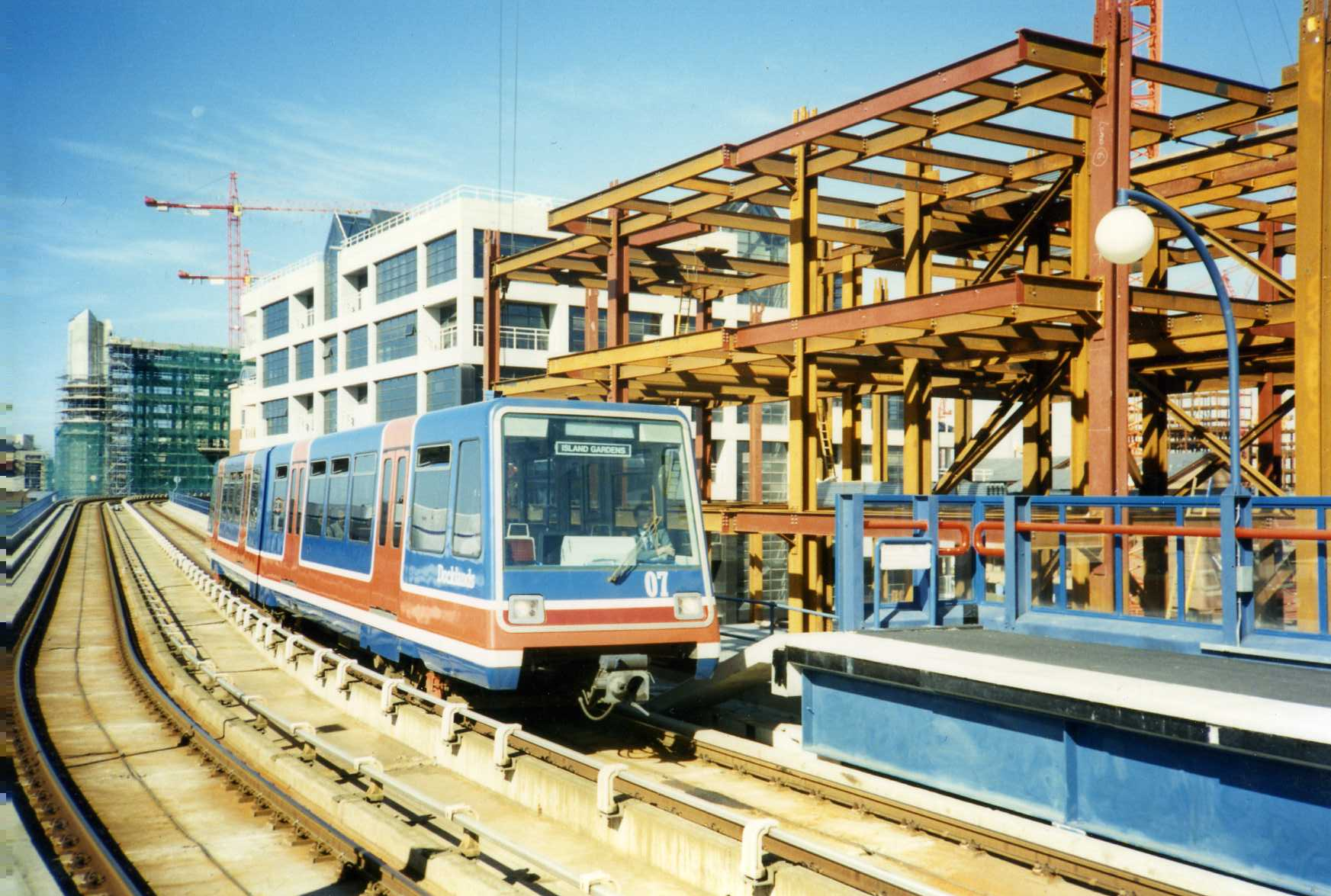
The Docklands Light Railway at South Quay in 1991, both built as a result of LDDC interventions

The London Docklands Development Corporation (LDDC) was a quango agency set up by the UK Government in 1981 to regenerate the depressed Docklands area of east London. During its seventeen-year existence, it was responsible for regenerating an area of 22 square kilometres (8.5 sq mi) in the London Boroughs of Newham, Tower Hamlets and Southwark. LDDC helped to create Canary Wharf, Surrey Quays Shopping Centre, London City Airport, ExCeL London, London Arena and the Docklands Light Railway, bringing more than 120,000 new jobs to the Docklands and making the area highly sought after for housing. Although initially fiercely resisted by local councils and residents, today it is generally regarded as having been a success and is now used as an example of large-scale regeneration, although tensions between older and more recent residents remain.

== Background ==
London's Docklands were at one time the largest and most successful in the world. The West India Docks which were opened in 1802 were followed by the London Docks, East India Docks, and St Katharine Docks in the years afterwards and Surrey Docks, Millwall Dock and the Royal Docks in the rest of the 19th century. In 1909, after a number of mergers and collapses, the Port of London Authority was established to manage the docks. Tens of thousands of people were employed by the docks, as well as other nearby related industries, such as flour mills.

During World War II, the docks area was heavily bombed during the Blitz, in an attempt to destroy London's economy and weaken the war effort. This damaged or destroyed much of the docklands infrastructure, as well as almost a third of the area's housing.

There was a brief resurgence during the 1950s but the docks were empty by 1980. The main reason was containerisation: goods used to be brought into the UK by relatively small ships and unloaded by hand; from the 1970s onwards most trade was carried within intermodal containers (shipping containers) or by truck on roll-on/roll-off ferries.

Between 1961 and 1971, almost 83,000 jobs were lost in the five boroughs in the Docklands area (Greenwich, Lewisham, Newham, Tower Hamlets and Southwark). A large percentage of the jobs which were lost were from large transnational corporations which had previously provided good job security. The decline was heightened by government policies which favoured the growth of industry outside London.

The housing in the Docklands area was nearly all council-owned terraced housing and flats. There was no commercial infrastructure such as banks or building societies or any new office accommodation.

== Formation ==
The London Docklands Development Corporation was established by the then Secretary of State for the Environment, Michael Heseltine, under section 135 of the Local Government, Planning and Land Act 1980. It was financed by a grant from central government and from the proceeds from the disposal of land for development.

The corporation acted as a catalyst benefiting from the full range of planning authority powers (principally those of development control).

Additionally, the Government set up an Enterprise Zone with certain tax breaks in the area.

== Operation 1981–1994 ==
The Docklands area as administered by LDDC.

LDDC's first chief executive was Reg Ward, a former chief executive of Hereford and Worcester County Council and Hammersmith and Fulham London Borough Council. Ward said if he had created some grand plan..."we would still be debating and nothing would have got built. Instead, we have gone for an organic, market-driven approach, responding pragmatically to each situation."

Billingsgate Market had relocated from the City to Docklands in 1982, and this was thought to be typical of the type of industry which might be accommodated.

However, Docklands was close to the City of London and this made it an attractive secondary office location as well as a possible site for riverside residential development to accommodate the phenomenon of yuppies, the young high-income single-person households created by new jobs in the financial services industry. In the first few years of LDDC's operation several offices and flats schemes were given the go ahead including on Heron Quays and Surrey Quays. Many of these buildings demonstrated unique architecture, such as the Baltic Quay building in the Surrey Docks.

LDDC's success was due to seizing opportunity and making maximum use of its assets. When faced with a large amount of redundant railway infrastructure, the LDDC created a cheap light rail scheme, the Docklands Light Railway to make use of it. This in turn made the whole area more accessible to the public and helped create the conditions for further development.

When American/Swiss banker Michael von Clemm visited West India Docks looking for a restaurant site, he became interested in the idea of building a back office. Reg Ward jumped on this and the resulting scheme became the successful Canary Wharf development. This development far exceeded initial projections for growth in the Royal Docks, and Canary Wharf developer Olympia and York proposed an extension of the Jubilee line to serve the site. Beginning construction in 1993, the Jubilee Line Extension opened in 1999 after the end of the LDDC.

The LDDC tapped into the boom in air travel by creating a small business airport making use of the vast open spaces of the Royal Docks. London City Airport became a fast-growing and popular airport.

During the 1980s private housing was developed in Docklands which with some minor exceptions were the first to be built in the area. Soon many people from outside the area saw the opportunity of buying a house close to the city at what appeared to be cheap prices. On many of the developments, local council tenants were given first opportunities to buy at discounted prices, but this led to a number of abuses.

== Effects outside London ==
The success of the LDDC spurred the government to set up similar bodies elsewhere, for example in Merseyside (1981) and later the Black Country, Cardiff Bay, Trafford Park (Greater Manchester) (all 1987), and the Central Manchester Development Corporation (1988).

== Undemocratic nature ==
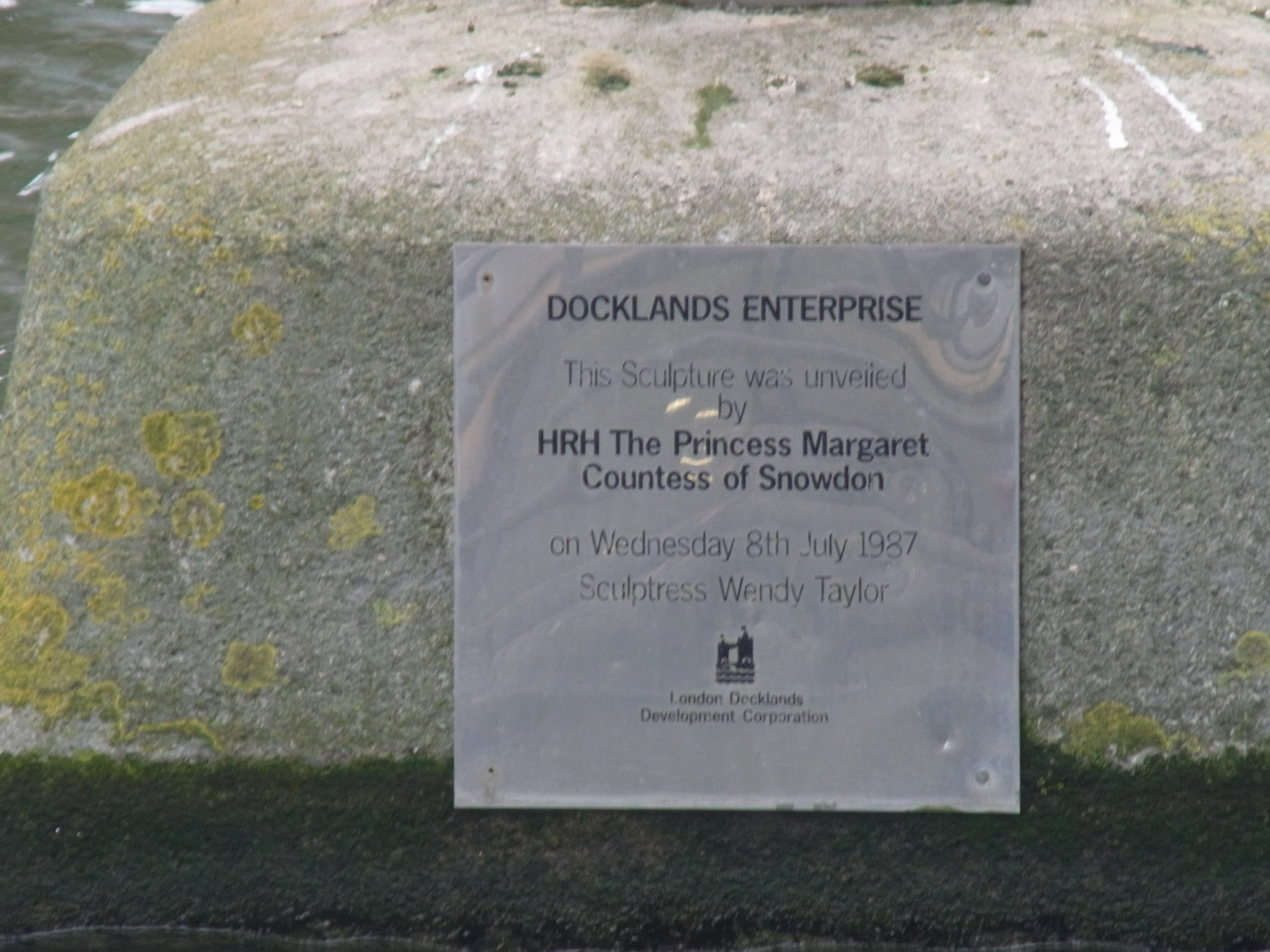
Plaque on commemorative sculpture of 1987 to the London Docklands Development Corporation as seen in 2021

One feature of the LDDC was that it was "insulated" from the local democratically elected councils. Eddie Oliver, Deputy Chief Executive (1981–87) agreed that it was undemocratic, explaining that it was an extraordinary arrangement for an extraordinary situation".

== Withdrawal 1994–1998 ==
The LDDC began a staged withdrawal in 1994. It withdrew from Bermondsey in 1994, followed by Beckton in 1995, the Surrey Docks in 1996, from Wapping, Limehouse and the Isle of Dogs in 1997, and finally from the Royal Docks in late 1998. Under a process called "dedesignation" the powers it held reverted to the London boroughs. It was formally wound up on 31 March 1998.

== See also ==
- London Thames Gateway Development Corporation, a similar development corporation operating in Thames Gateway between 2004 and 2013
- London Legacy Development Corporation, a similar development corporation in the aftermath of the 2012 Olympic and Paralympic Games
- Cascades, Isle of Dogs
