= Southwark Park =

Park in Rotherhithe, East London

Coordinates: 51.495°N 0.056°W

Southwark Park Act 1864
- Act of Parliament
- Parliament of the United Kingdom
- Long title: An Act to enable the Metropolitan Board of Works to provide a public Park for the South-eastern Districts of the Metropolis, to be called Southwark Park.
- Citation: 27 & 28 Vict. c. iv

Dates
- Royal assent: 28 April 1864

Other legislation
- Repealed by: Local Law (Greater London Council and Inner London Boroughs) Order 1965

Status: Repealed

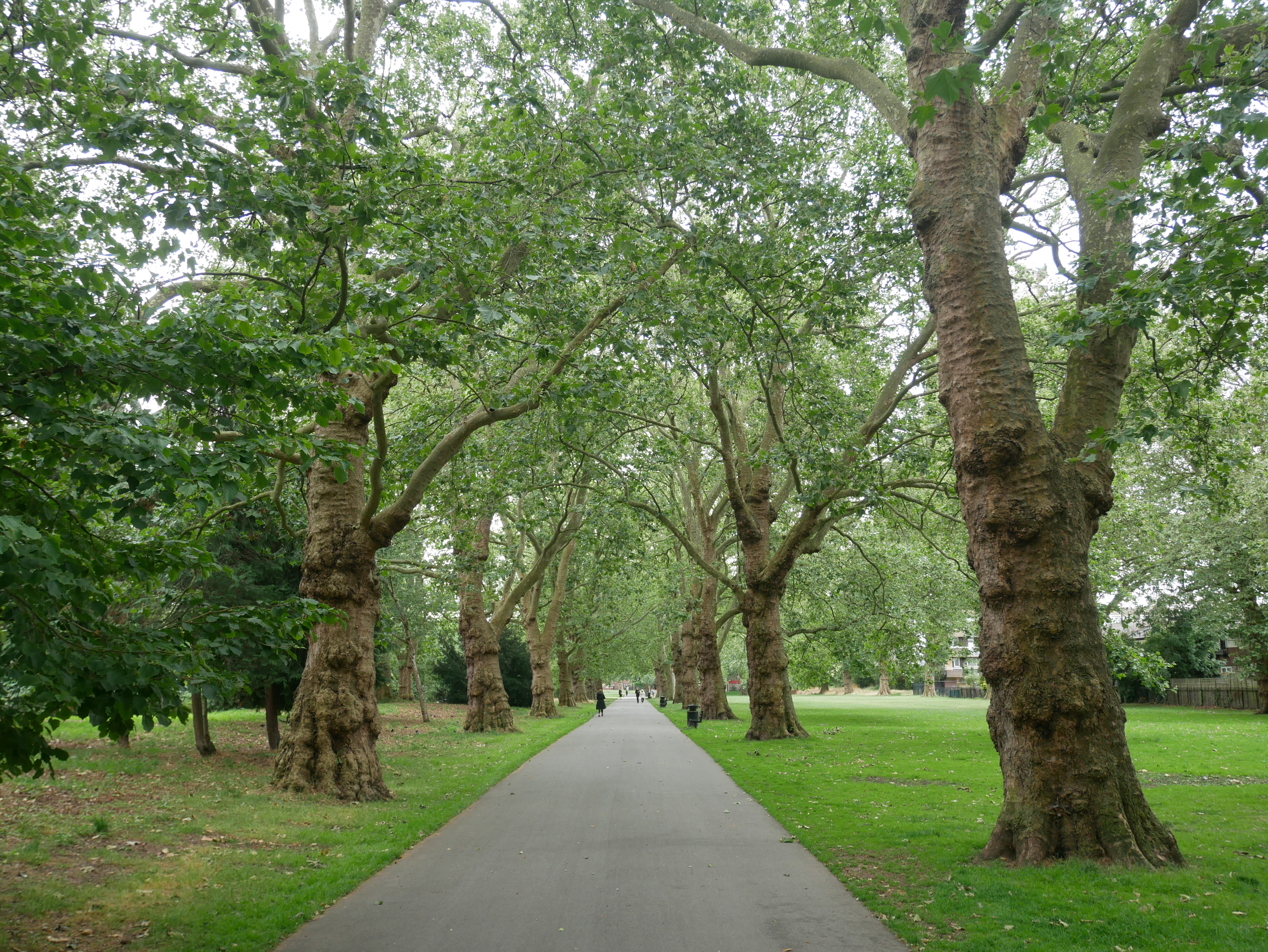
Landscaped pathways along the east end of Southwark Park

Southwark Park is located in Rotherhithe, in central South East London, England, and is managed by the London Borough of Southwark. It first opened in 1869 by the Metropolitan Board of Works as one of its first parks. It was designed by Alexander McKenzie and covers 63 acres (250,000 m^{2}). It takes its name from being in what was the old parliamentary constituency of Southwark at the time of its opening.

It received £2.5 million from the National Lottery's Heritage Lottery Fund in 1998 which enabled large parts of the park to be refurbished. The park is protected by Fields in Trust through a legal "Deed of Dedication" safeguarding the future of the space as public recreation land for future generations to enjoy.

== Gardens ==
The Old English Cottage Garden was originally named for Lt-Col J. J. Sexby, first Parks Superintendent for the London County Council. The idea for the rose garden came from Dr Alfred Salter, Member of Parliament for West Bermondsey. It was opened in 1936 and was named after Ada Salter when she died in 1942. A "Tree of Heaven" (Ailanthus glandulosa) is also planted there, which had a symbolic meaning in relation to Salter's Quaker beliefs.

== Facilities and activities ==
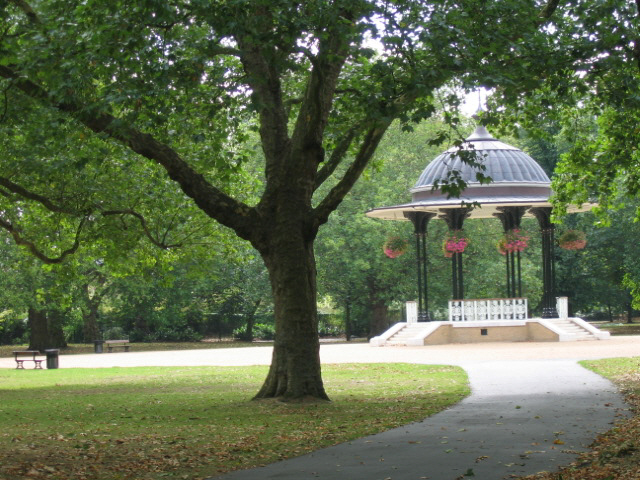
Southwark Park: Bandstand

The bandstand dates from 1884 and was originally sited in the Royal Horticultural Society grounds at South Kensington. It has a sister in Peckham Rye Park. Other facilities include a cafe, a wildlife garden, a boating lake and Southwark Park Galleries, which has a year-round programme over two galleries. Sports facilities include an athletics track run by Fusion, a bowling green, football pitches, a cricket pitch and tennis courts. The park also has a contained children's playground with swings, a slide and other small rides. The park is also home to Southwark parkrun, one of the many free, weekly 5k runs held in both the UK and internationally. It is held every Saturday at 9.00am (localtime).

There are "Friends of Southwark Park" and "Young Friends of Southwark Park" groups to encourage the community to get involved in the management of their park. The Friends of Southwark Park is a non-party-political community organisation, recognised by the London Borough of Southwark. Its primary role is to liaise with, and encourage the council to look after the parks in the interests of the people who use them.

In 2018 a new group, the Southwark Park Association 1869, was formed to further the park's aims and objectives.

== Trees ==
As with many spaces within London, the Plane tree (Platanus × hispanica) is dominant within Southwark Park, particularly the northernmost section around the bandstand, which runs next to Jamaica Road.

However, the park is also rich in trees less common in London. Opposite the entrance to the art gallery is a walnut tree (Juglans regia) and a series of three or four silver maples (Acer saccharinum). There is as also a red oak (Quercus rubra) close to these maples. Next to the duck pond and the garden area are three swamp cypresses (Taxodium distichum), although without the distinctive wooden 'knees' which sometimes surround trees of this variety.

== Transport ==
There are three London Overground stations (formerly on the London Underground network's East London line but now on the Overground's Windrush line) and two London Underground stations (one sharing with the London Overground) located near the edges of Southwark Park. In clockwise order starting from the west, they are:

- Bermondsey (Jubilee line)
- Rotherhithe (Windrush line)
- Canada Water (Jubilee and Windrush lines)
- Surrey Quays (Windrush line)

Local buses 47, 188, 381, C10 and P12 buses serve the park between the two Jamaica Road entrances. At night the park is served by N199 and N381 buses, while the 47 and 188 buses runs a 24-hour service.

The P12 also serves the park as it travels along Southwark Park Road and stops near the entrance there. There is also a small side entrance beside Kirby Estate, just adjacent to Southwark Park Road and close to Jamaica Road.

Local buses 1, 199 and N1, as well as the 225, 381 and P12 buses stop nearby the park along Lower Road, at Surrey Quays Station, near the Lower Road entrance and near where Rotherhithe Police Station used to be, across from Gomm Road, where another entrance to the park is at the end of it.

The 1 and 381 buses, along with their night routes; N1 and N381 also stop at Warndon Street, on Rotherhithe New Road. This is the closest stop to the Hawkstone Road entrance.

== Image gallery ==
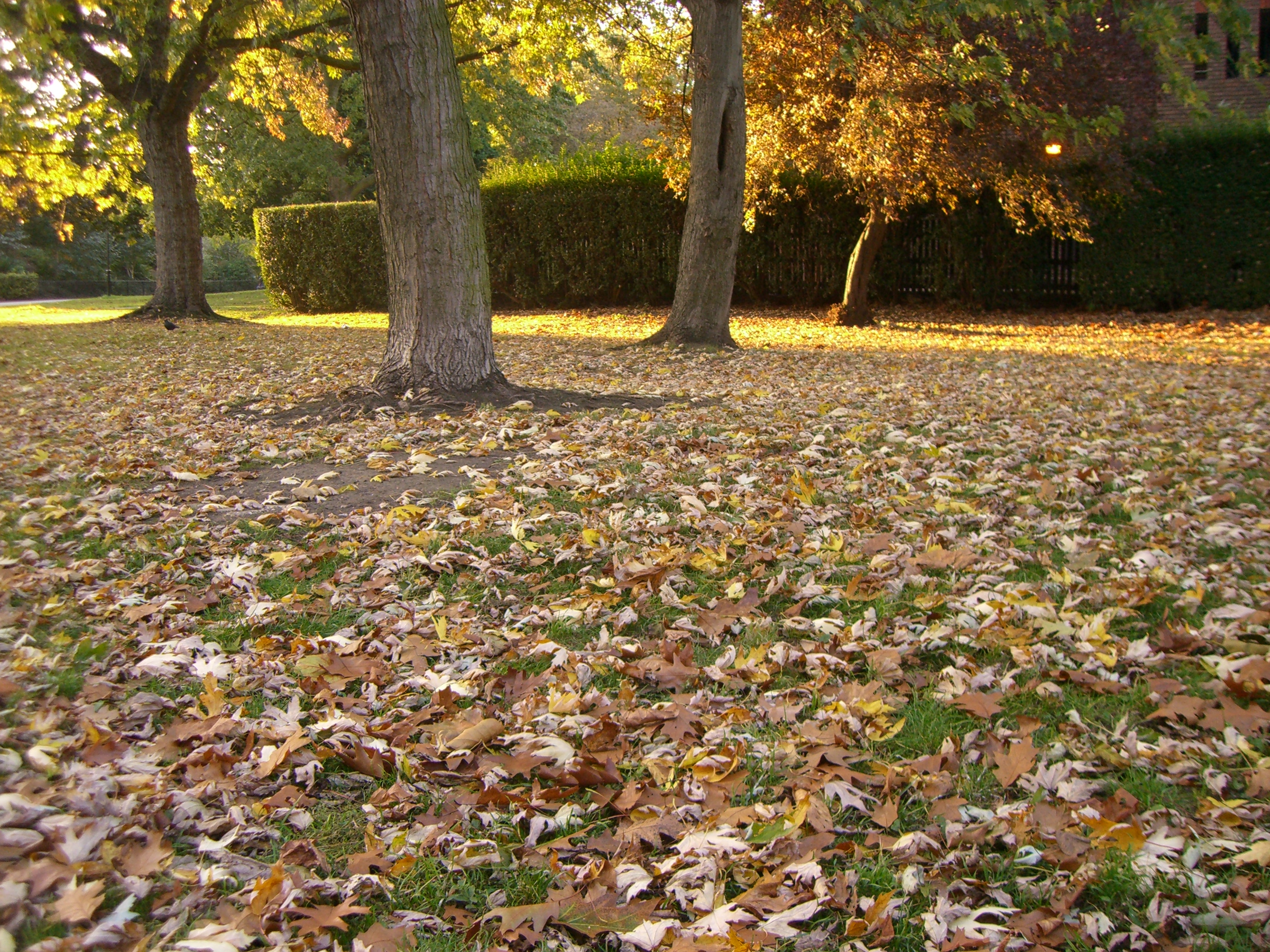
Autumn leaves

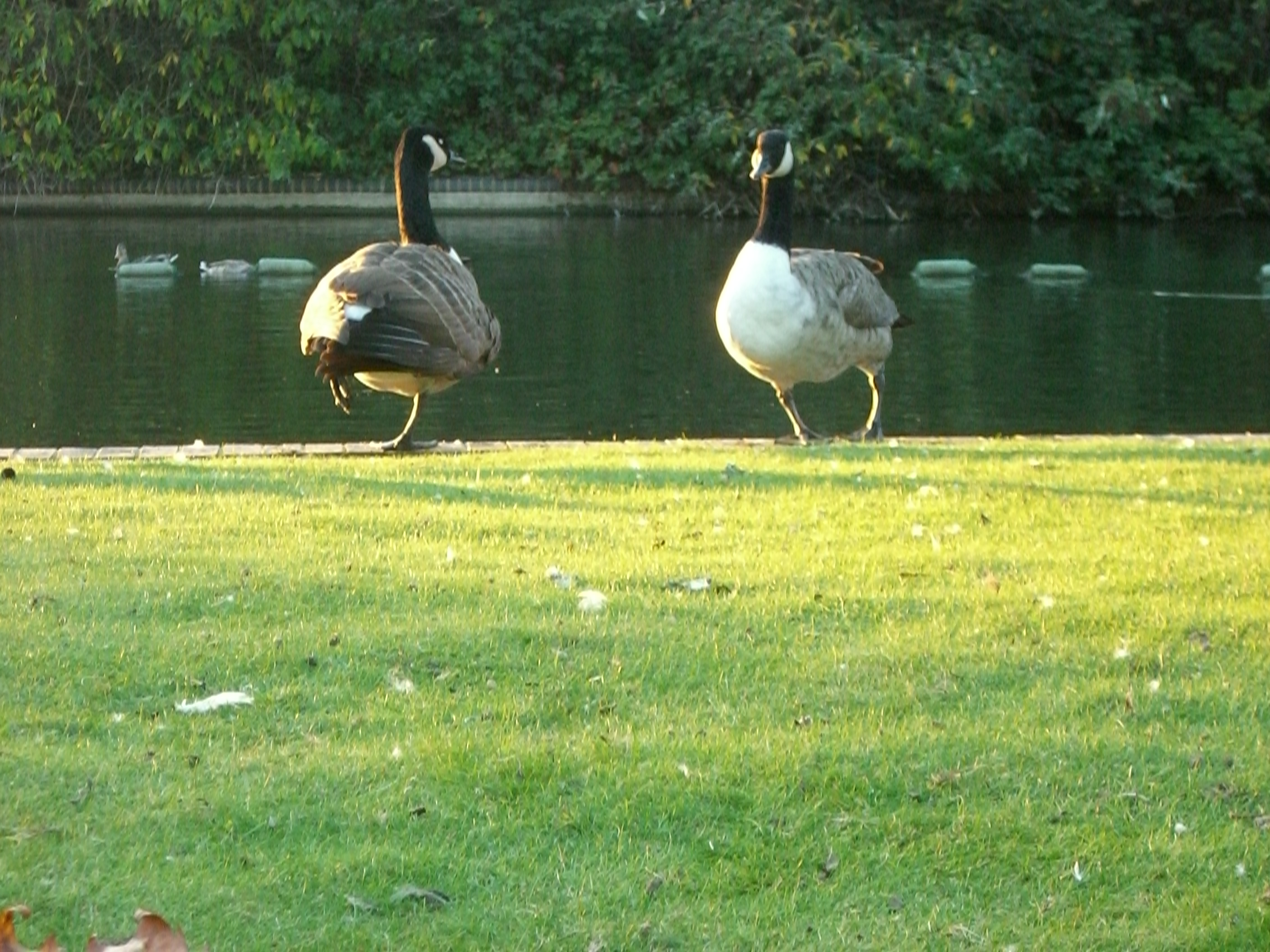
Wildlife

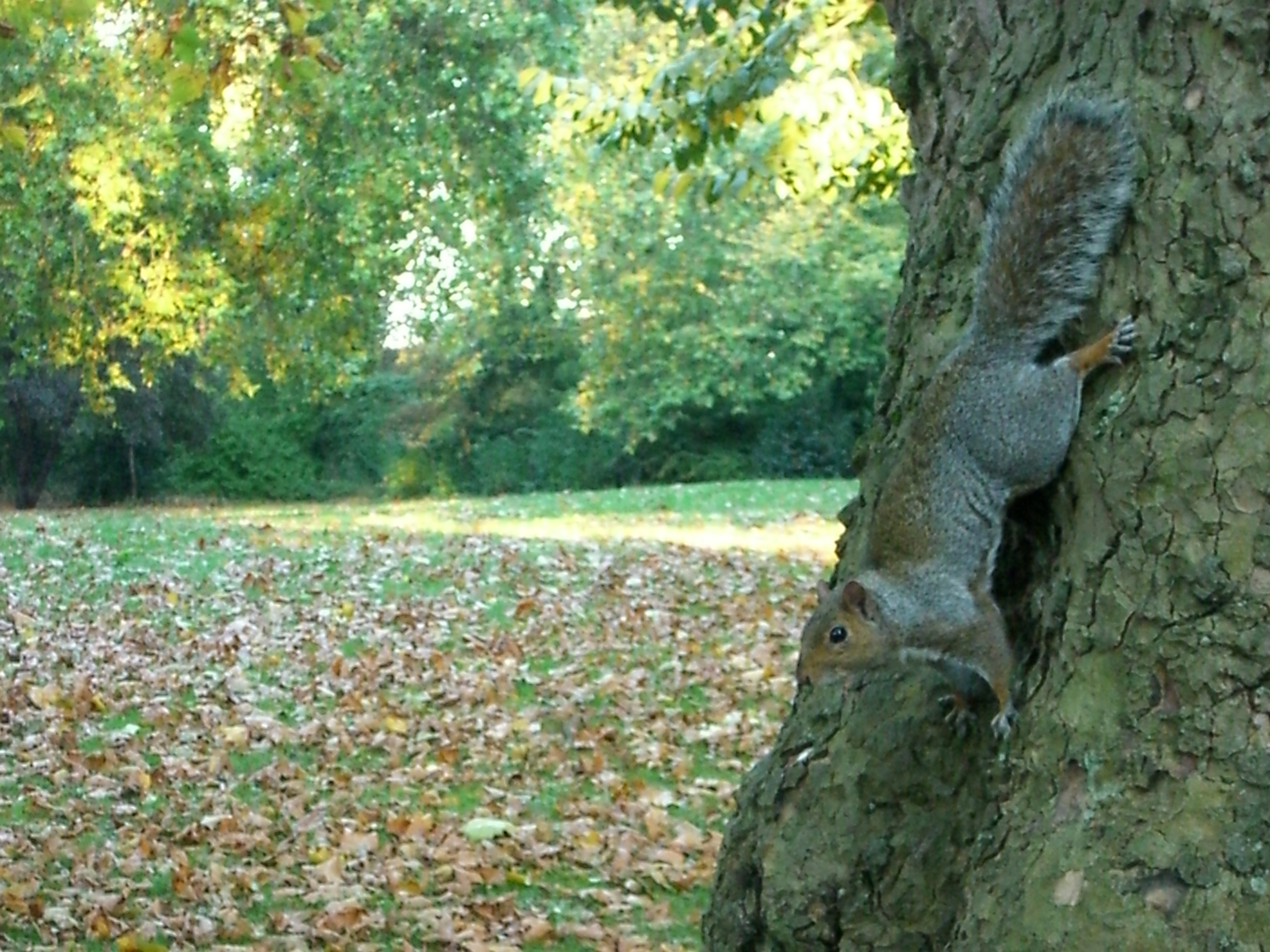
Wildlife

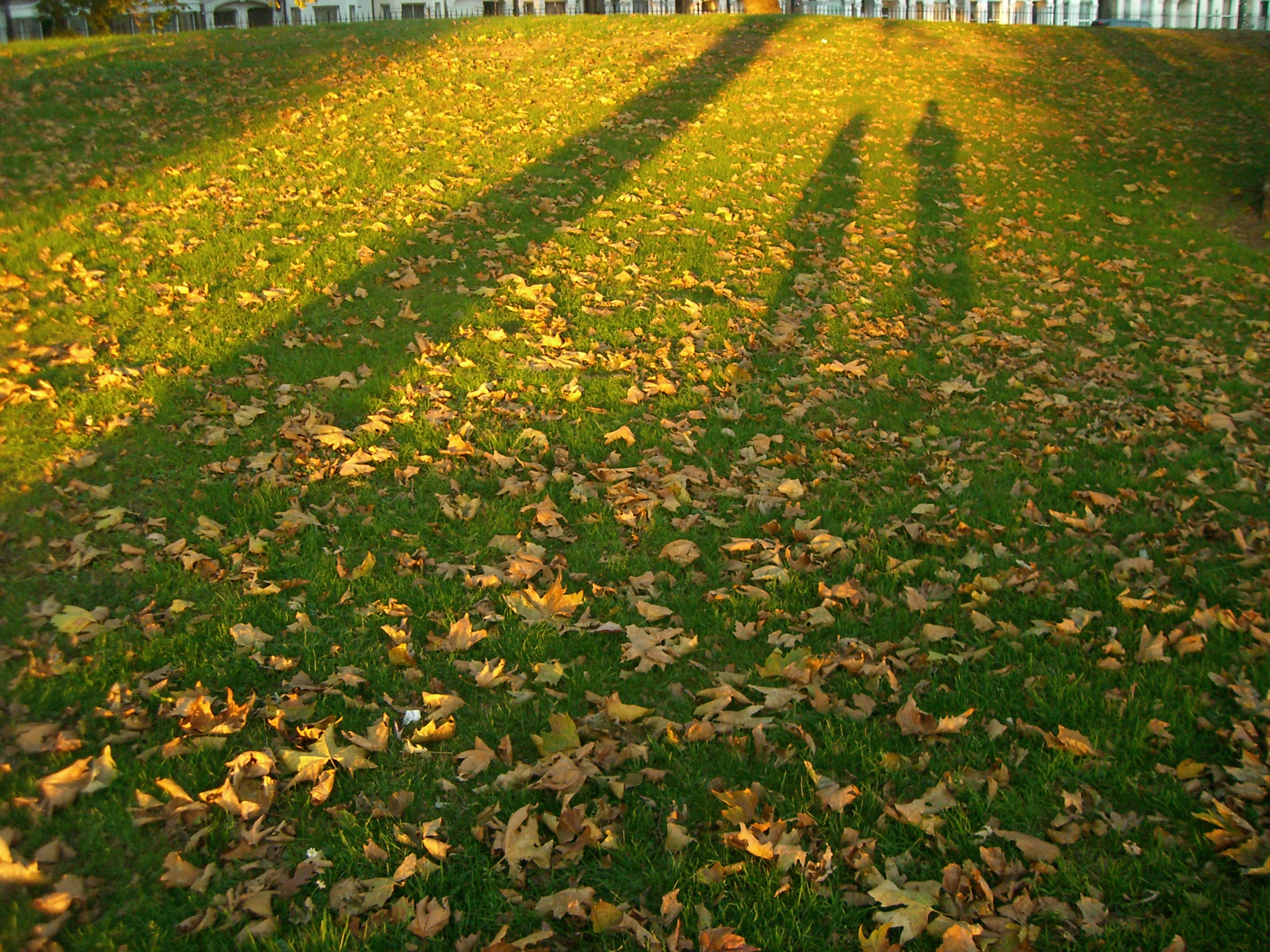
Evening

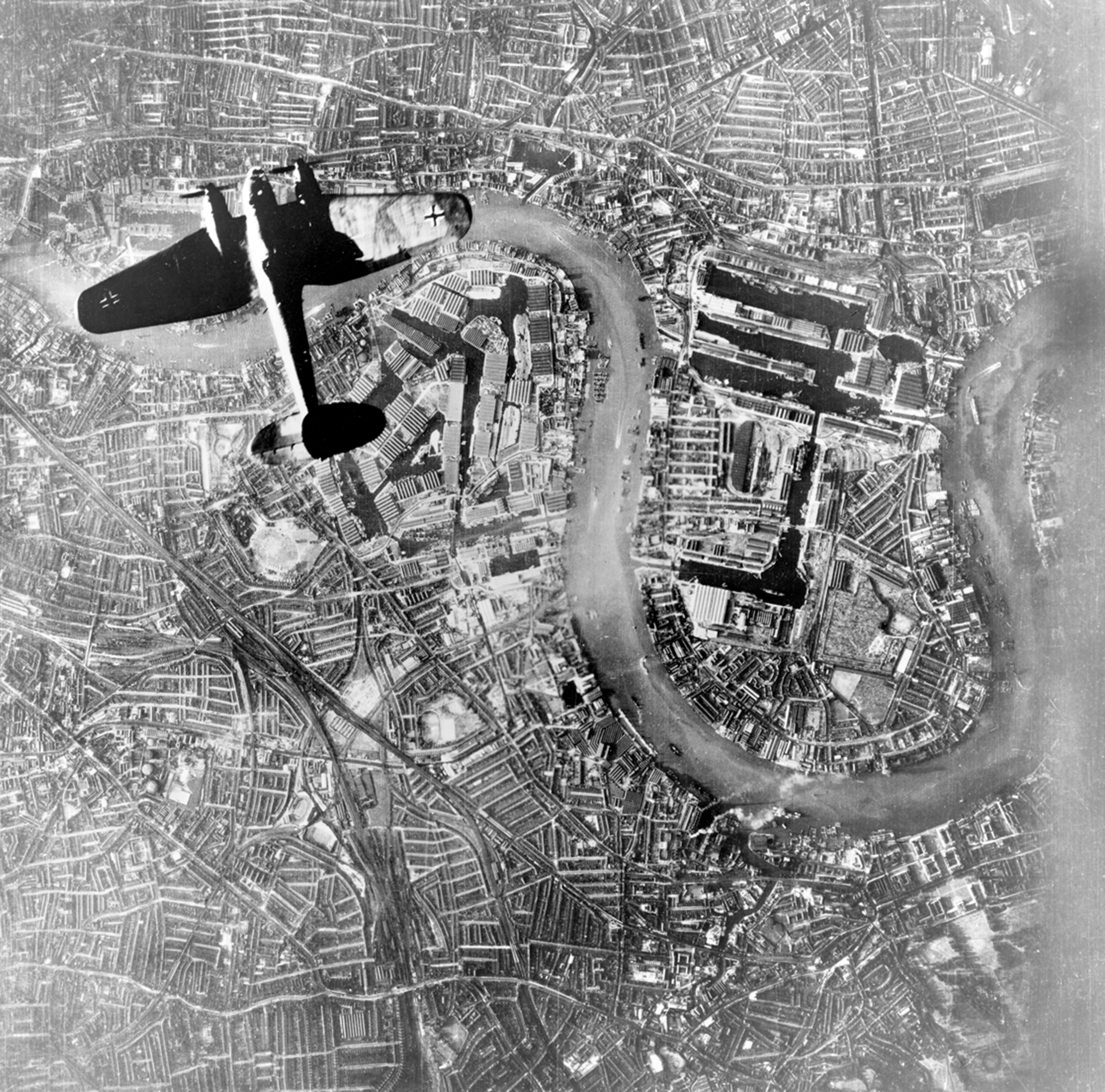
German warplane over Southwark Park
