= Trust for Urban Ecology =

Organization

The Trust for Urban Ecology (TRUE) is a London-based ecological organisation and is part of The Conservation Volunteers (formerly BTCV) since April 2012. The Trust for Urban Ecology was founded in 1976 when ecologist Max Nicholson and a group of like-minded conservationists set up Britain's first urban ecology park.

== History ==
Max Nicholson, the trust's founder, was also instrumental in setting up the World Wildlife Fund and became the 2nd Director General of the Nature Conservancy Council.

The trust's first site, the William Curtis Ecological Park, was created on the site of a derelict lorry park near London's Tower Bridge. The William Curtis Ecological Park was always intended to be temporary and in 1985 the land was returned to its owners. By this time the trust had already created two new nature parks and it would later acquire another two.

== Current sites ==
- Stave Hill Ecological Park
- Lavender Pond
- Greenwich Peninsula Ecology Park
- Dulwich Upper Wood

== Aims ==
- To provide a new habitat for urban wildlife
- To enable ecologists to discover more about the nature of urban ecology
- To offer city residents the chance to enjoy nature and learn through hands-on experience
- To demonstrate the value of creative conservation - an ecological approach to the creation of new landscapes
- To provide examples of best practice and key demonstration sites

== Other activities ==
- The trust offer environmental design, creation and management services
- Volunteer and work placement schemes
- Environment skills training
- Corporate team-building projects

== See also ==
- Urban Ecology
- The Conservation Volunteers
