= William Curtis Ecological Park =

Urban ecology park in England

Coordinates: 51°30′16″N 0°4′39″W

The William Curtis Ecological Park was the United Kingdom's first urban ecology park.

Max Nicholson and the Trust for Urban Ecology created it on a derelict lorry park near Tower Bridge in London in 1976. It was named for the 18th century botanist William Curtis.

In 1985 it was returned to the site owner, the London Docklands Development Corporation, who provided the Stave Hill Ecological Park in Rotherhithe as a replacement. City Hall and Potters Fields Park now occupy the site.
