= London Buses route 1 =

London bus route

1
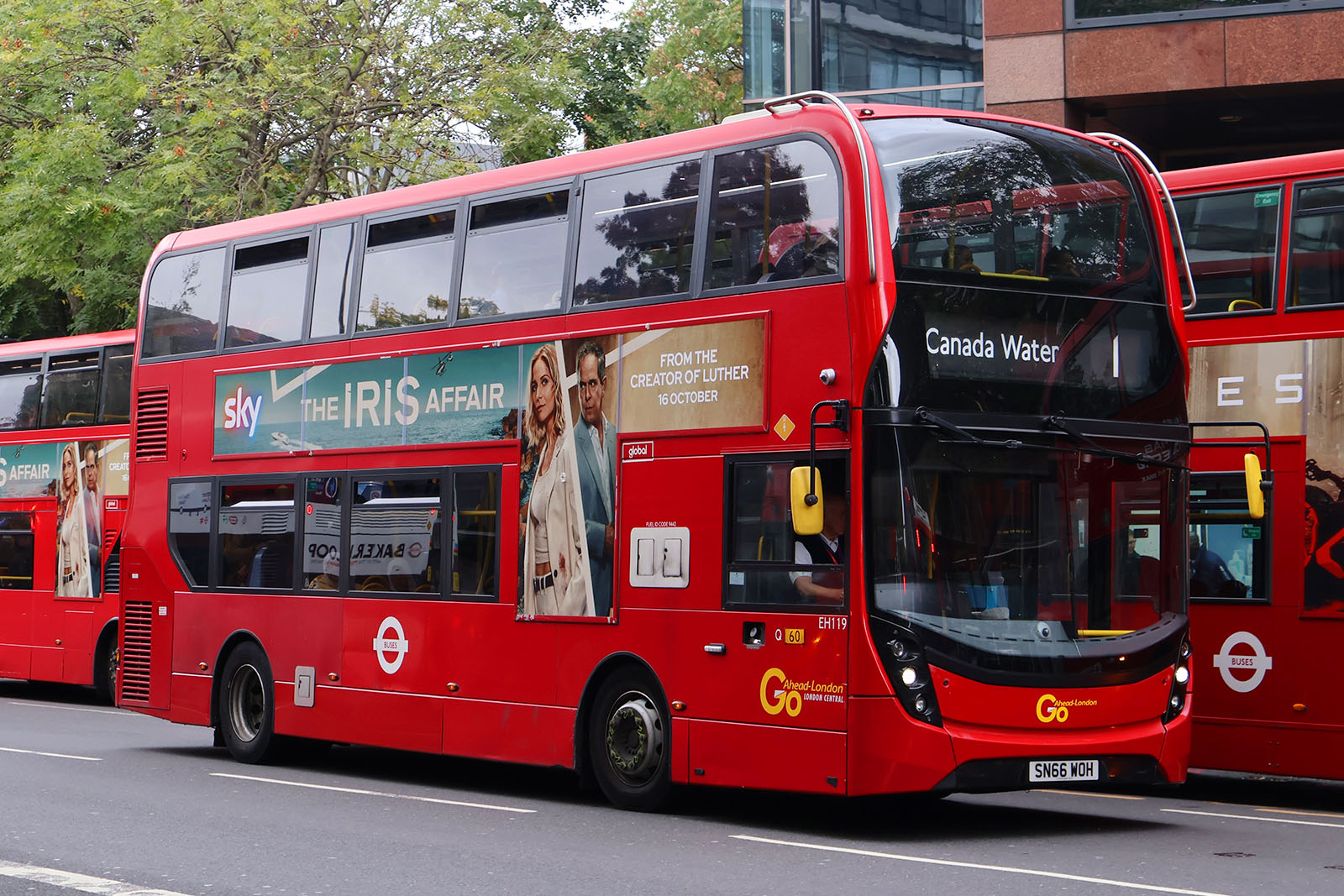
- London Central Alexander Dennis Enviro400H MMC in Elephant and Castle in October 2025

Overview
- Operator: London Central (Go-Ahead London)
- Garage: Camberwell
- Night-time: N1

Route
- Start: Canada Water bus station
- Via: Surrey Quays; South Bermondsey; Bricklayers Arms; Elephant and Castle; Waterloo; Aldwych; Holborn; Russell Square; Euston; Mornington Crescent; Camden Town
- End: Hampstead Heath

Service
- Level: Daily

London Buses route 1 is a Transport for London contracted bus route in London, England. Running between Canada Water bus station and Hampstead Heath, it is operated by Go-Ahead London subsidiary London Central.

== History ==
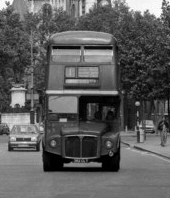
An AEC Routemaster double-decker, operating on route 1 on the Strand, 1981

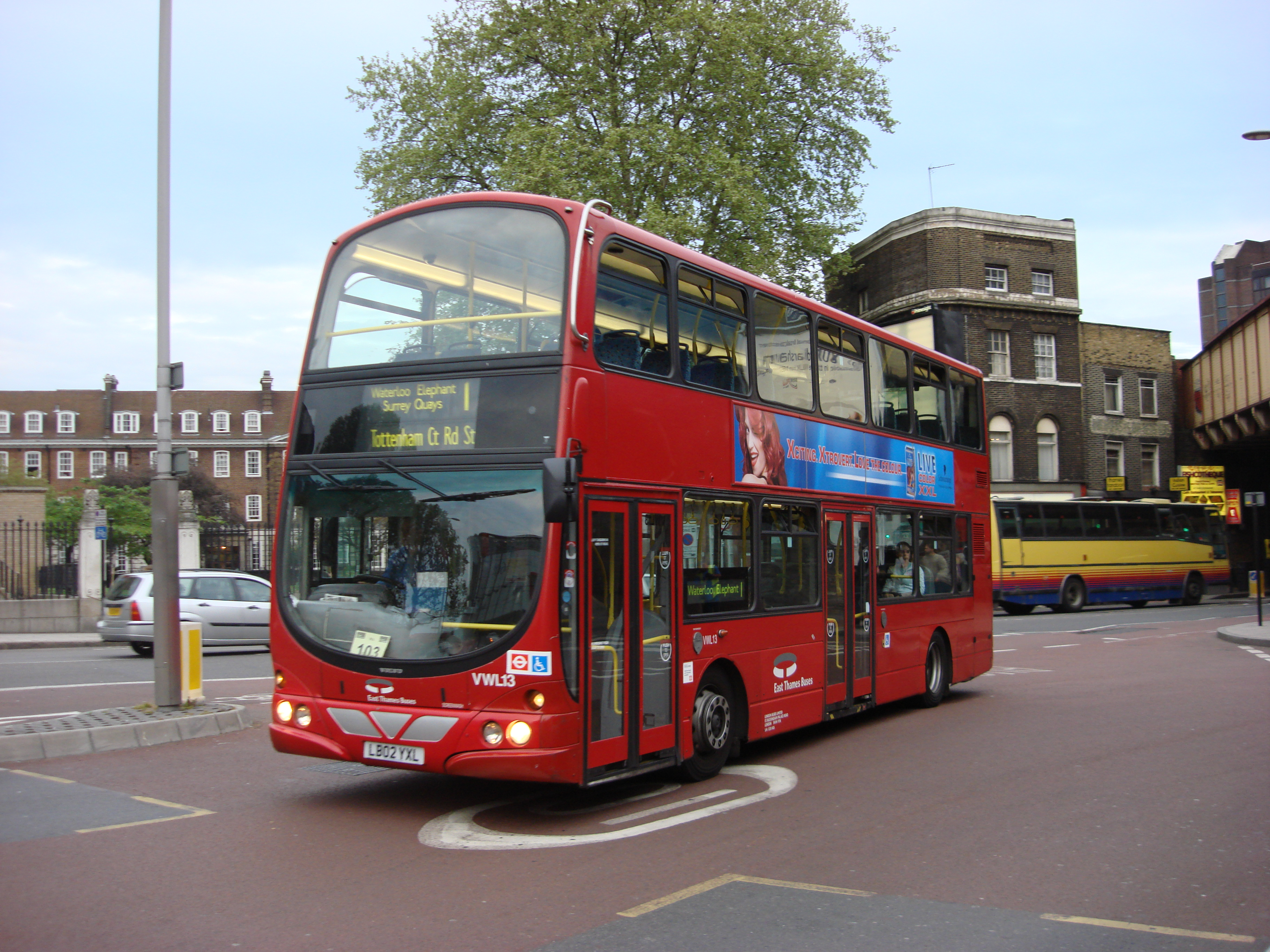
A Volvo B7TL double-decker operated by East Thames Buses on route 1 at Waterloo, 2007

Route 1 was one of the first motorbus routes to be introduced in London. It was in operation by November 1908. By the time the London Passenger Transport Board took over its operations in 1933, it operated from Willesden garage to Lewisham. In June 1956, the Willesden to Marylebone station section was replaced by route 176.

Despite subsequent route changes, it continues to serve part of its original route, between Elephant & Castle and Aldwych.

On 3 October 2009, East Thames Buses was sold to London General, which included a five-year contract to operate route 1. London General commenced a further contract on 1 October 2016 with a peak vehicle requirement of 17 Wright Gemini 3 bodied Volvo B5LHs.

In November 2021 Transport for London launched a successful consultation with a view of merging routes 1 and 168 to form a continuous service between Hampstead Heath and Canada Water, as well as re-routing route 188 to serve its former terminus at Tottenham Court Road. These changes came into effect on 30 September 2023.

== Current route ==
Route 1 operates via these primary locations:

- Canada Water bus station for Canada Water station
- Surrey Quays station
- South Bermondsey
- Bricklayers Arms
- Elephant & Castle station
- Waterloo station
- Aldwych
- Holborn station
- Russell Square station
- Euston station
- Mornington Crescent station
- Camden Town station
- Chalk Farm station
- Belsize Park station
- Hampstead Heath
