= Canada Water bus station =

Bus station in London, England

Coordinates: 51.4977°N 0.0500°W

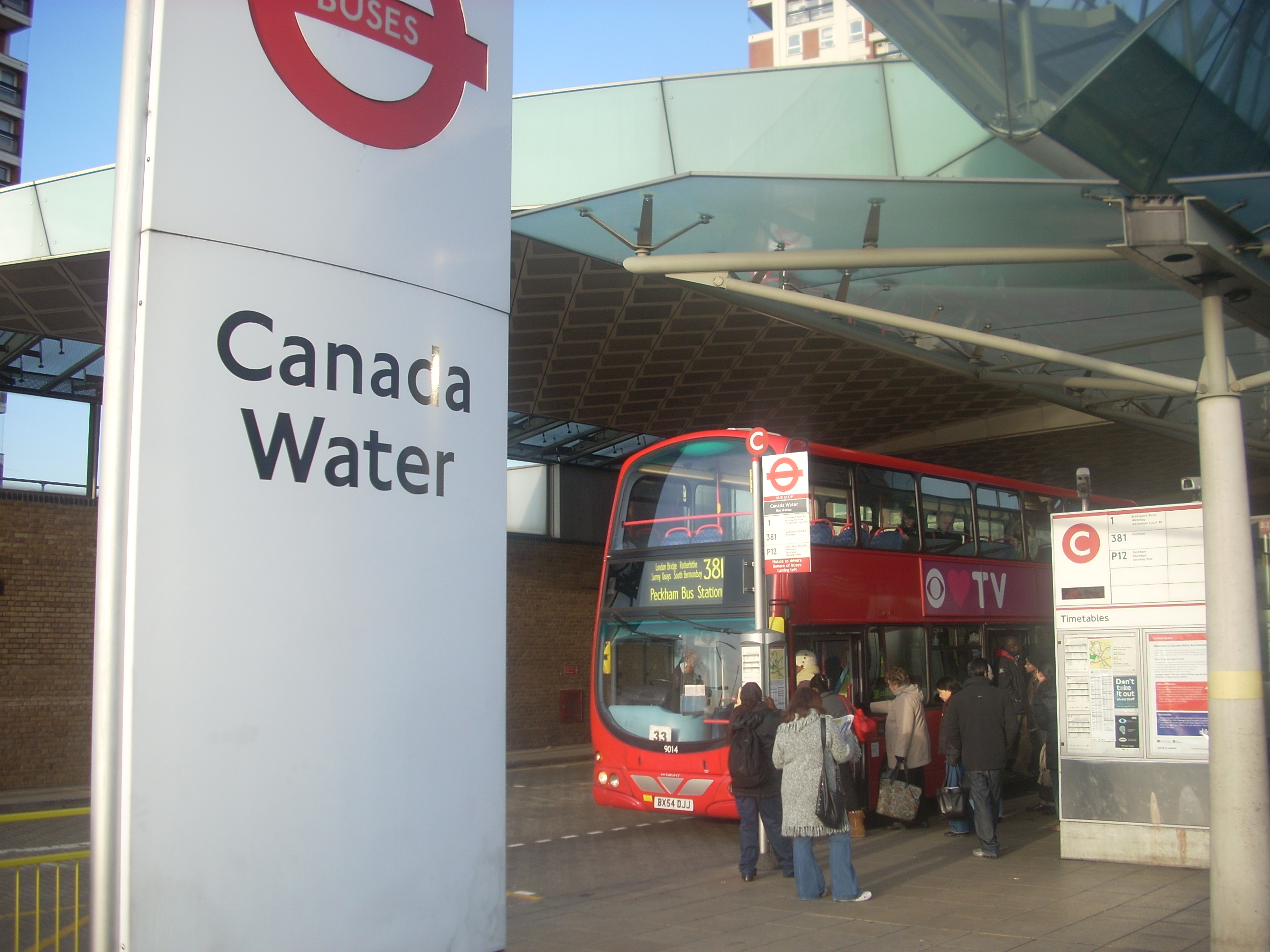
- Abellio London Wright Eclipse Gemini bodied Volvo B7TL on route 381 at the bus station in December 2009

General information
- Location: Surrey Quays Road, Rotherhithe; London Borough of Southwark
- Operator: Transport for London
- Bus routes: 1, 47, 188, 199, 225, 381, C10, N199, N381, P12
- Bus stands: 5
- Bus operators: Go-Ahead London; Stagecoach London; Transport UK London Bus
- Connections: Canada Water station

History
- Opened: 18 September 1999; 26 years ago
Location

Canada Water bus station serves the Rotherhithe area of the London Borough of Southwark, London, England. The station is owned and maintained by Transport for London.

The bus station was opened on 18 September 1999 at the same time as the Jubilee line extension to Stratford reached Canada Water and is accessible by escalator from Canada Water station below easily. It is very near to Surrey Quays Shopping Centre. There is one alighting stand and four boarding stands within the bus station.

The glass-roofed bus station was designed by Eva Jiřičná. It is a hub for services in the Rotherhithe and Bermondsey areas as well as an interchange for the tube station. Its most distinctive feature is a row of 16 m (52 ft)-long roof spans cantilevered from a row of central columns supporting a 100 m (330 ft)-long glass and aluminium canopy. This provides acoustic protection to the surrounding residential blocks and shelters passengers waiting below from the elements.

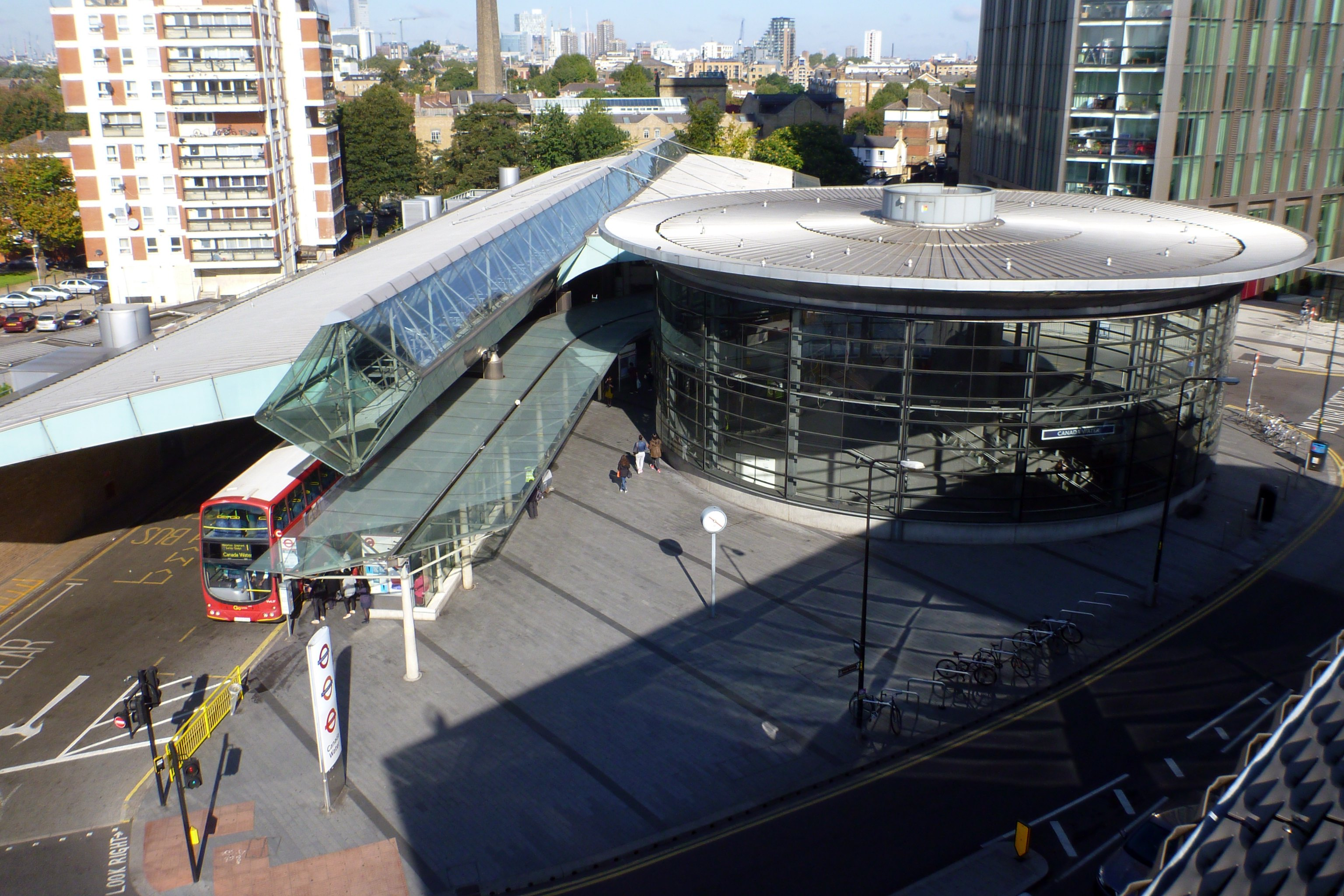
Canada Water bus station (left) viewed from the roof of Canada Water library in September 2015

== See also ==
- List of bus and coach stations in London
