= Canada Water =

Area in south-east London

Coordinates: 51°29′49.31″N 0°2′53.71″W

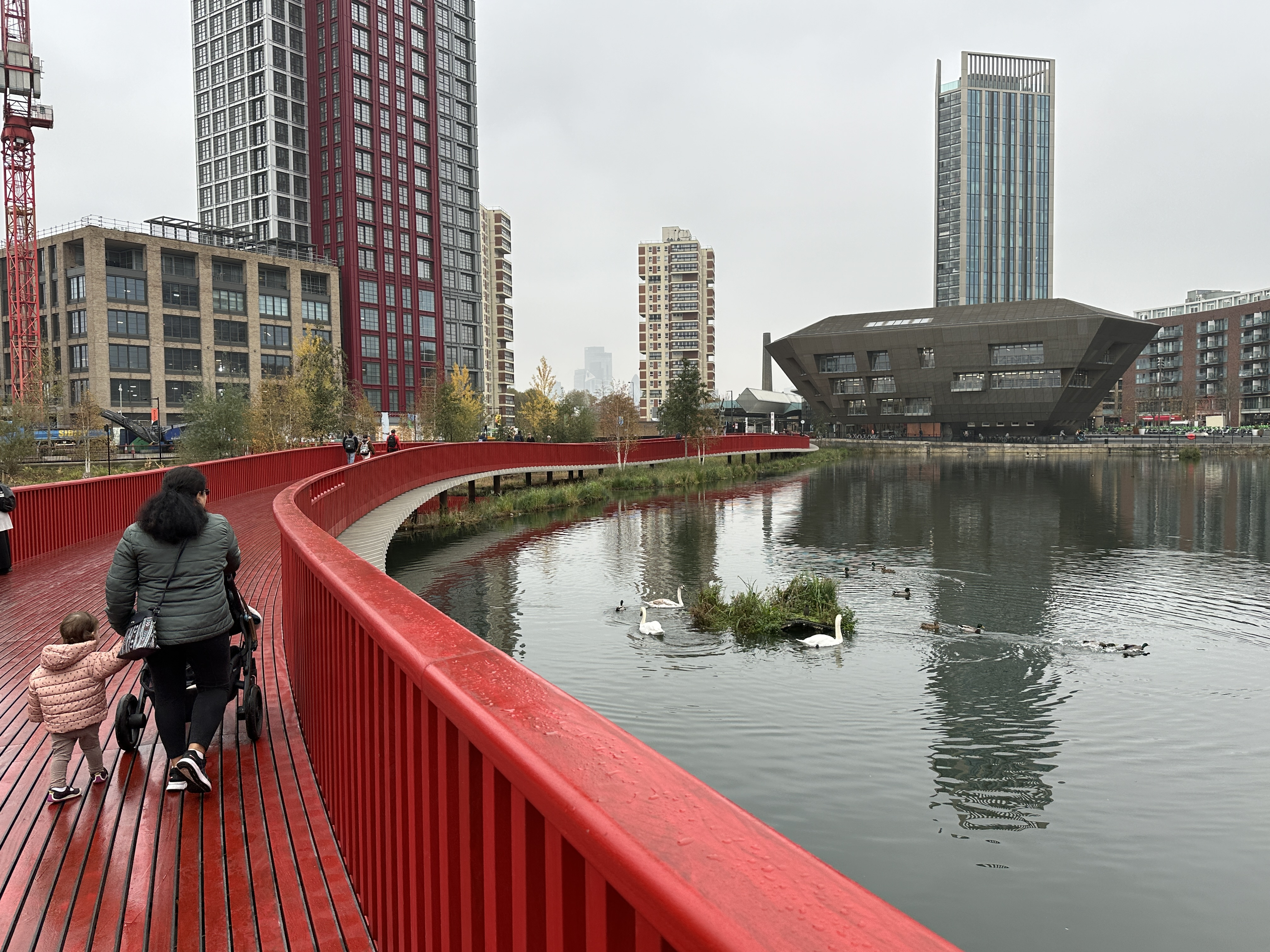
Canada Water as seen from the Canada Dock Boardwalk

Canada Water is an area of Rotherhithe in the Docklands of south-east London. It is named after a freshwater lake and wildlife refuge. Canada Water tube, Overground and bus station is immediately north of the lake, along with Canada Water Library which overhangs the lake and Deal Porter Square. Surrey Quays Shopping Centre is also adjacent, sitting immediately to the south. The surrounding area, which forms the town centre of Rotherhithe, is now increasingly known as Canada Water, after the transport interchange as much as the lake itself.

== History and development ==
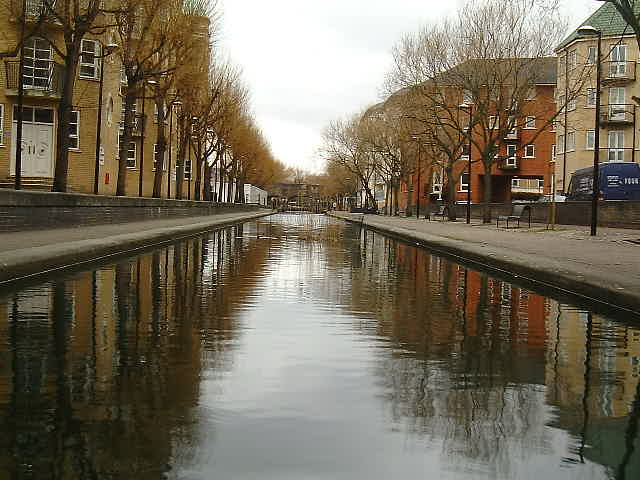
The Albion Channel linking Canada Water with Surrey Water

The lake is named after the former Canada Dock, of which Canada Water is the surviving northern third, and which was mainly used by ships from Canada. As with much of the Docklands, the Surrey Commercial Docks closed in the 1970s. During the 1980s, the London Docklands Development Corporation took over, and invested heavily in the redevelopment of the area. About half of Canada Dock was infilled and the Surrey Quays Shopping Centre built on top of it; the remainder was converted into the present lake and wildlife refuge. An ornamental canal, Albion Channel, was created (through the site of the now filled-in Albion Dock) linking Canada Water to Surrey Water, with the spoil used to create Stave Hill in nearby Russia Dock Woodland.

Following the earlier gentrification of the parts of Rotherhithe along the river, the extension of the Jubilee line in 1999 moved the focus to the area immediately around Canada Water. The opening of the new Canada Water Underground station gave the area rapid connections to the rest of London, with Canary Wharf one stop, Westminster less than 10 minutes, and Bond Street around 15 minutes away by underground train. The station's connection to the London Overground network in 2010 added a quick connection to the City of London, with a journey of around 10 minutes to Shoreditch High Street station, near Liverpool Street Station.

The area has since been further developed, with additional residential developments, a library which opened in November 2011, and plans to redevelop the shopping mall in a first step towards creating a more traditional town centre. In 2018, architect Allies and Morrison submitted a masterplan for area's continued development, but some of the plans for tall buildings were revised after Historic England said the proposals would harm views of capital landmarks. Approved by Southwark Council in 2020, the masterplan was revised in 2025 to increase the height of some buildings due to fire safety requirements for second staircases. The masterplan covers a former printworks, the shopping and leisure centre near the Dalton Cross roundabout, the dock offices and the former Rotherhithe police station, with tall buildings playing "a significant role in transforming Canada Water into a new town centre". The whole masterplan was expected to take about 15 years to deliver, though Allies and Morrison's plans received over 1,000 objections.

In November 2024 the Canada Dock Boardwalk, a 170-metre boardwalk spanning the length of the lake, was opened to the public. A parade featuring giant puppets took place on the boardwalk to celebrate its opening. In October 2026, British Land paused redevelopment due to market conditions, with only phase one having been completed.

== Freshwater lake ==
Canada Water is the only body of fresh water in London Docklands. The lake is now kept topped up with fresh water using a windpump. This arrangement was put in place following research by the landscape architect Fraser Borwick, which revealed that ground water had historically been extracted to supply various industrial processes using wind power. After checking the borehole results of the Jubilee line construction team, it was established that large amounts of potable water were available, and a borehole 80 metres long was sunk into the ground. The borehole is lined for 60 metres, and the bottom 20 metres is into chalk. The investigation of how best to keep the lake topped up with fresh water was the result of some damage to the lining of the old dock during construction works in the 1980s. Another solution considered involved securing a water supply from the flooded tunnels of London Underground, but this was considered too risky.

The lake's reedbeds support a variety of aquatic plants such as lesser reedmace, and are home to a variety of waterfowl including mute swans, tufted ducks, mallards, moorhens and coots. A non-native terrapin, known locally as Señor Tortuga, has also been sighted in the lake.

== Gallery ==
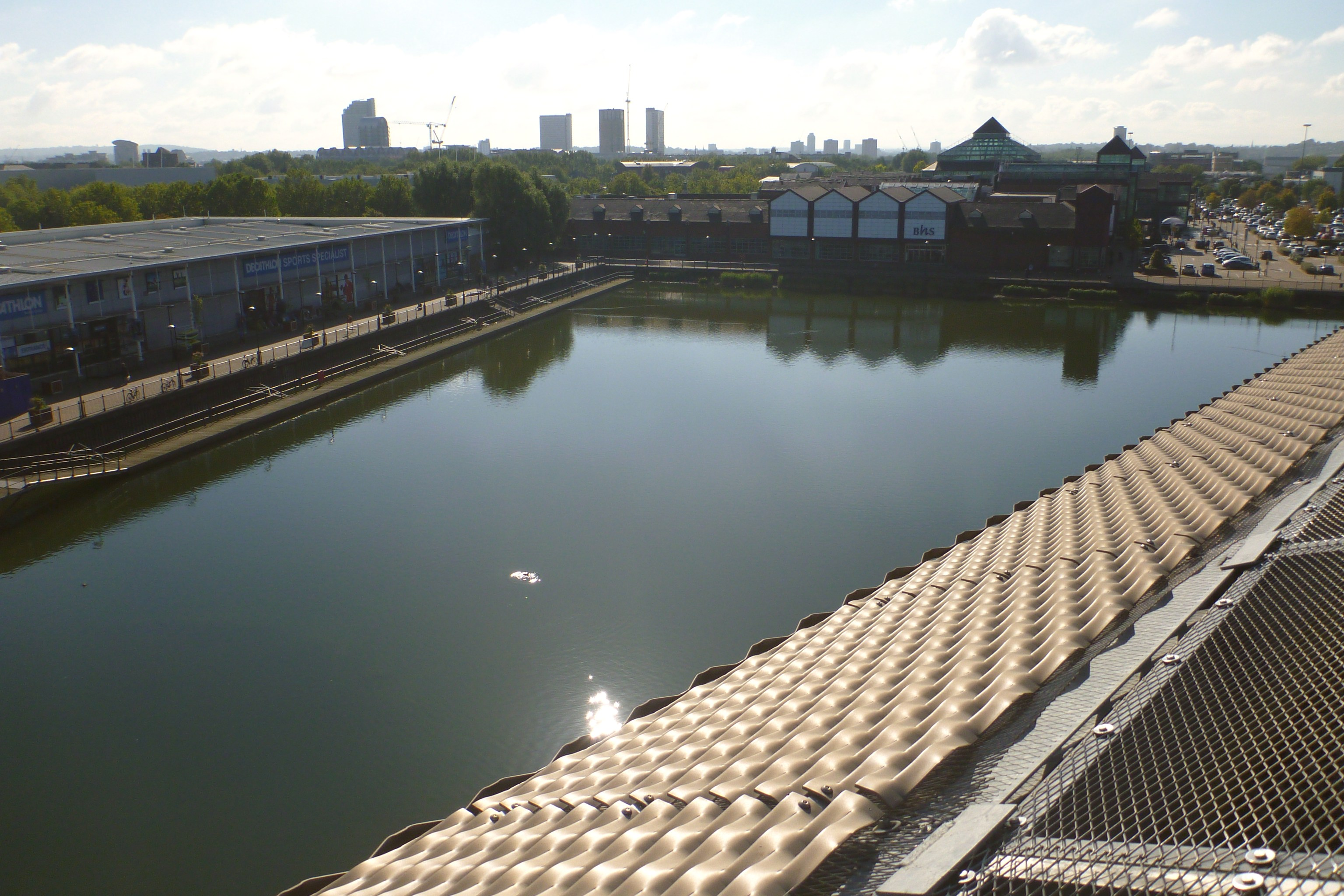
The lake with Surrey Quays Shopping Centre in the distance

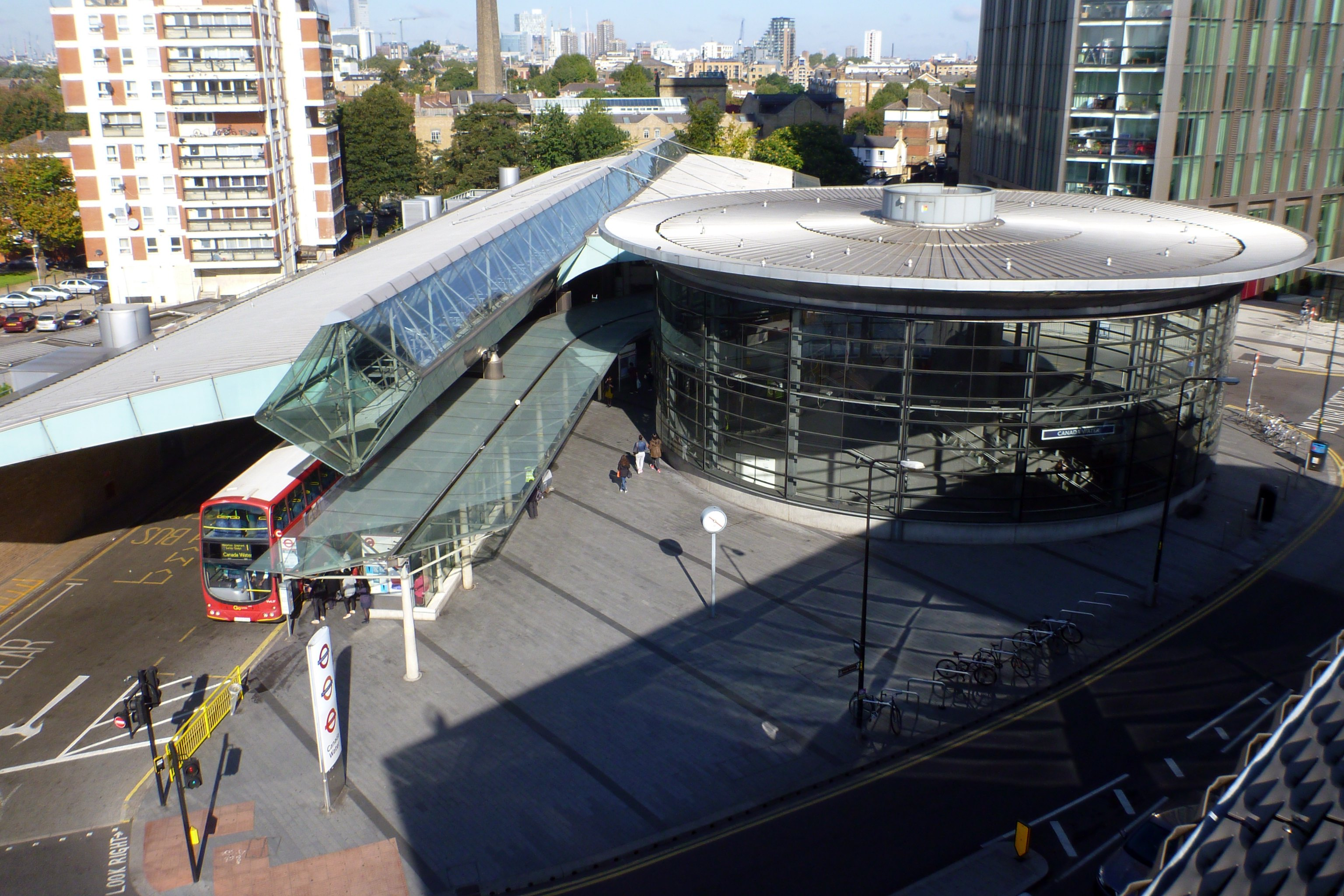
Canada Water Underground, Overground and bus station

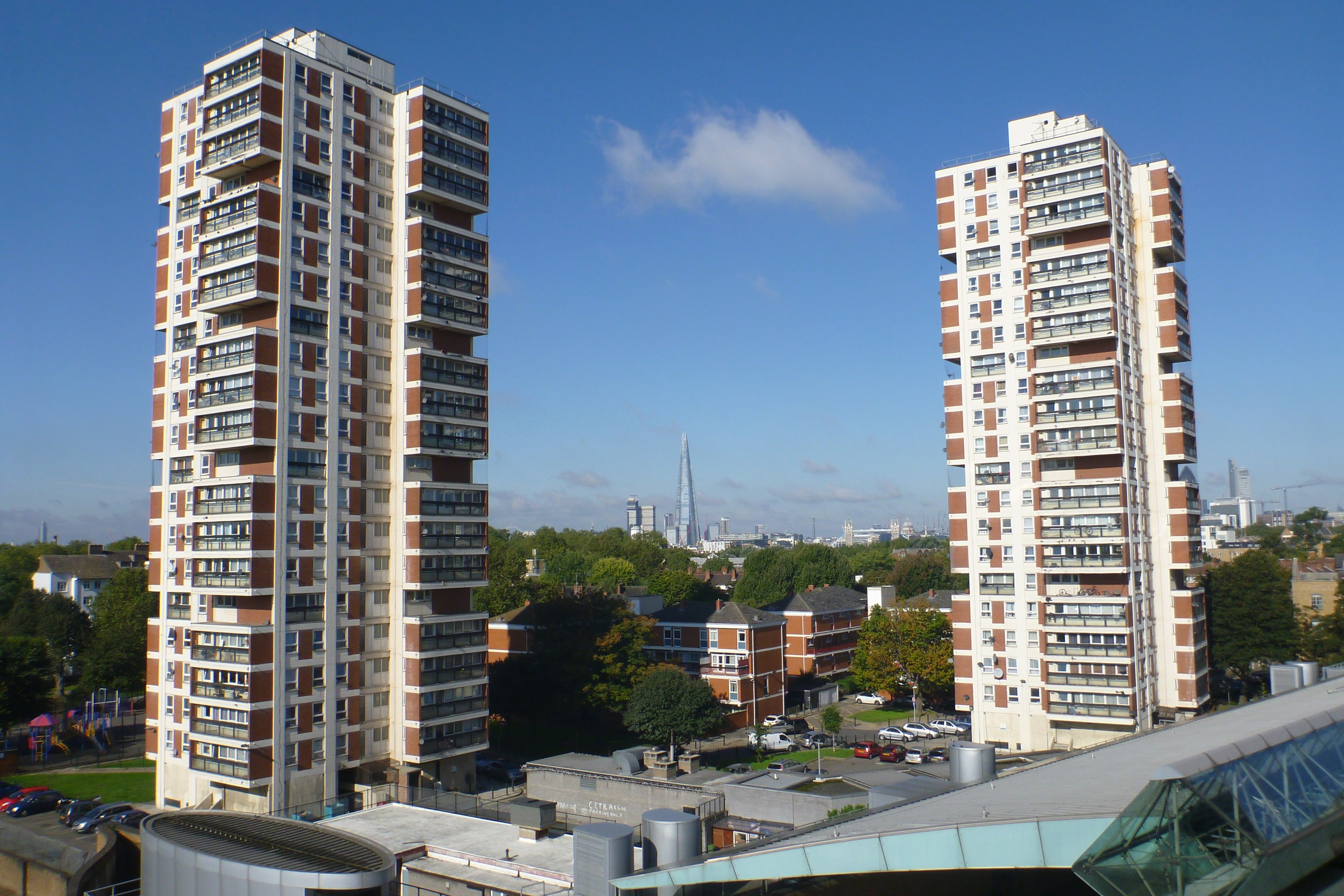
Columbia Point (left) and Regina House (right) flats

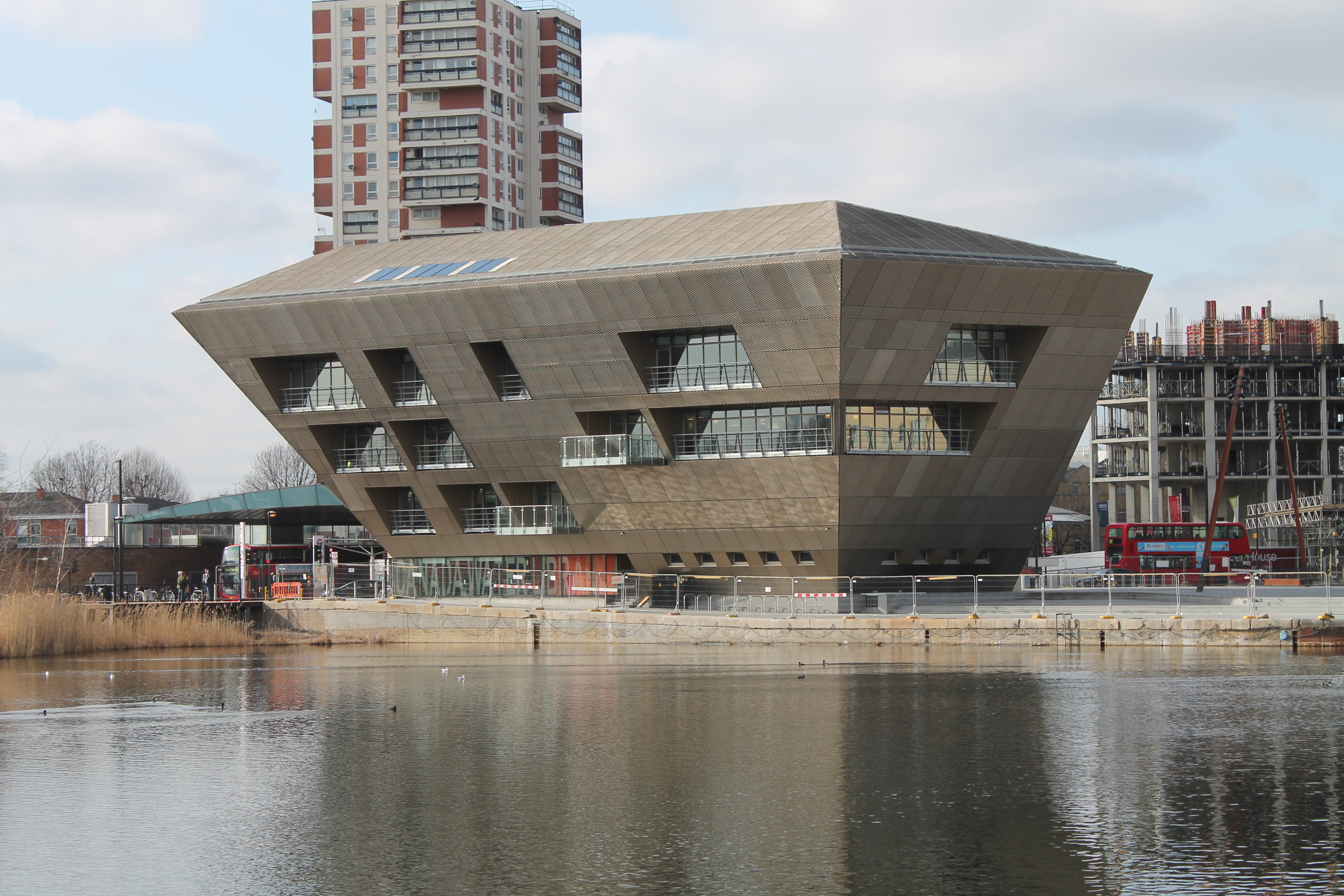
Canada Water Library, with the lake itself in the foreground

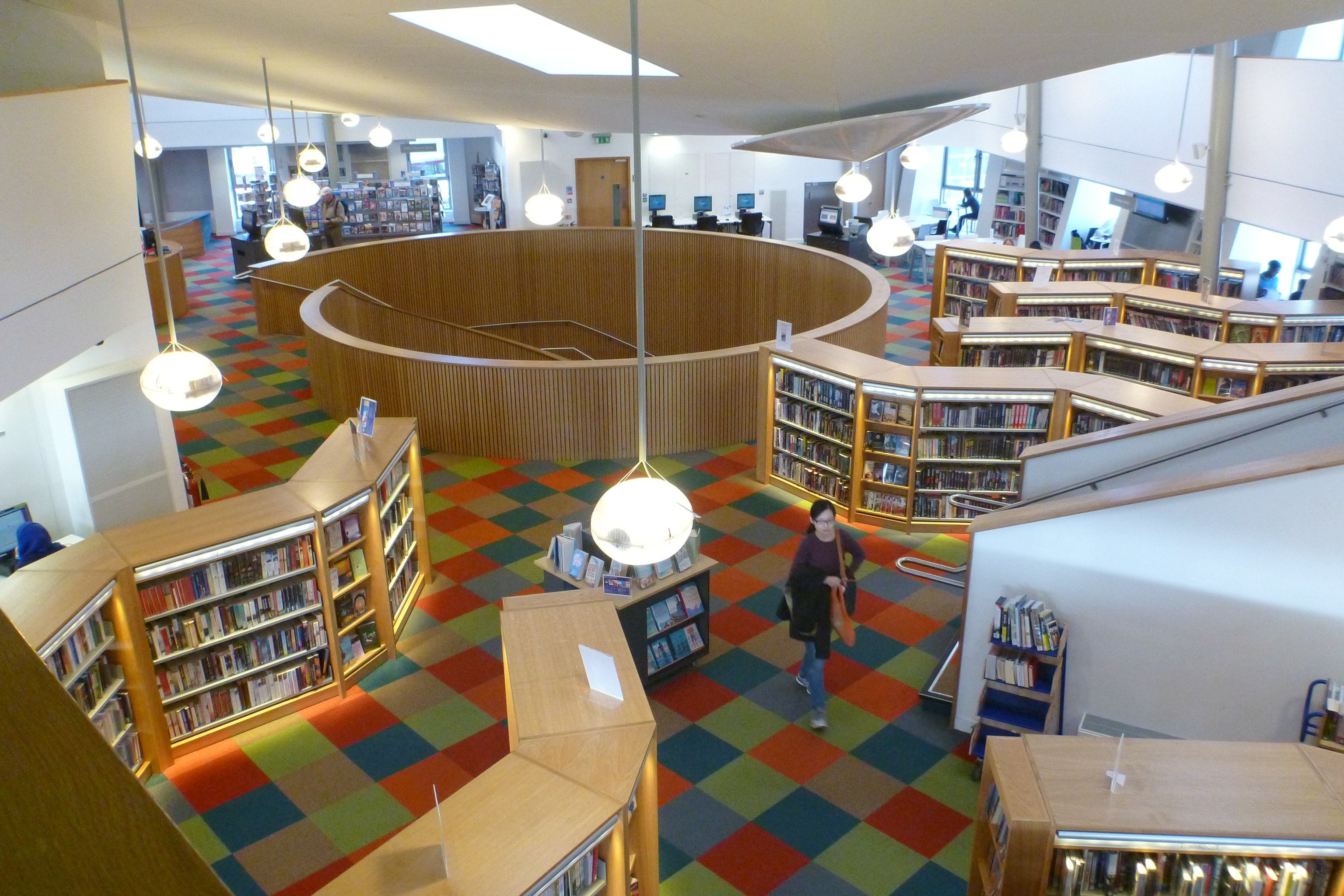
The main floor of Canada Water Library

== Places nearby ==
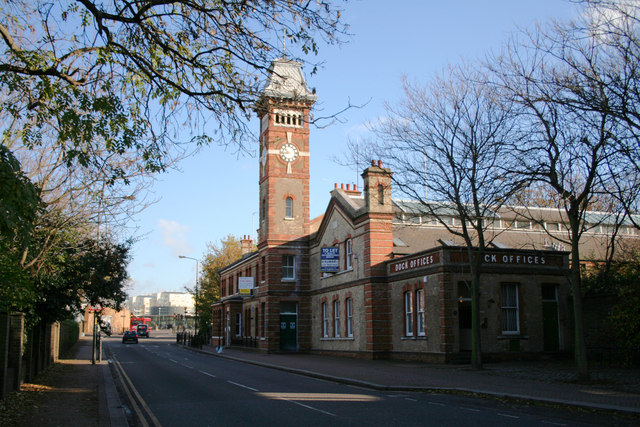
Former Surrey Dock Offices, close by Canada Water

- Surrey Quays Shopping Centre
- Greenland Dock
- Rotherhithe
- Russia Dock Woodland
- St. Mary's Church, Rotherhithe
- Stave Hill (including Ecological Park)
- Norwegian Church, Finnish Church, and former Swedish Seamen's Church
- Southwark Park
- Bacon's College
- Brunel Museum
- Printworks (London)
