= Brimmington Park =

Park in Peckham, London

Coordinates: 51°28′41″N 0°3′21″W

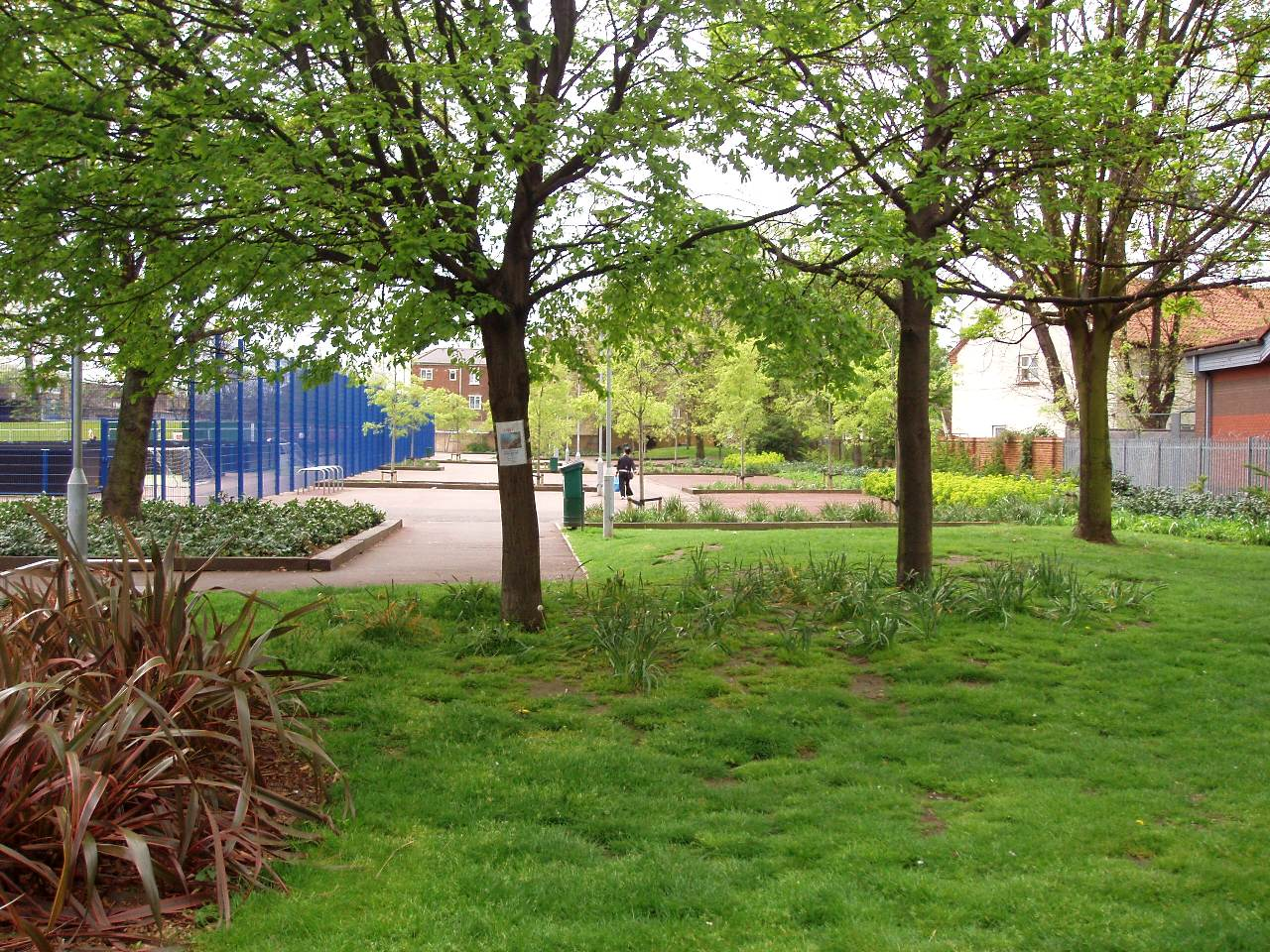
Brimmington Park in 2008

Brimmington Park is a small 1.79 hectares (4.4 acres) park in Peckham, London. It is located on Old Kent Road, Clifton Crescent and Culmore Road, London SE15 2RQ. It is also adjacent to the former Old Kent Road and Hatcham railway station, which closed temporarily in 1917 but which has never been re-opened.

== Origins ==
The park was created in the 1970s on the site of small factories and terraced housing.

A Regency-style terrace was built on Clifton Crescent (then called Clifton Grove) in 1847-51 when the area was first developed for housing. That row of housing is extant, and is now Grade II listed. Some of the land south of Clifton Grove remained open land, and to the east of Clifton Grove, running towards the railway line and station, were a series of gardens and a pond. By 1895 the street had been renamed, and the open land built over. The park was established in the 1970s.

== Features ==
The park has a playground (installed in 2008), two small AstroTurf pitches for mini-football, a large MUGA space, and an outdoor gym (installed in 2013). There is a sports centre which is currently (2022) derelict; Southwark Council propose to build in 2022 a new sports centre and to convert the existing pitches to new 3G all-weather pitches and a Toro interactive football facility.

Peckham Town F.C., which plays in the Kent County League, was established in 1982; it was originally called Brimmington Park FC, as this was the location of the nightly kickabouts for the earliest players.

The park has been designated as a Queen Elizabeth II Field since 2013 and is legally protected with Fields in Trust.

== Friends ==
There is a Friends of Brimmington Park organisation, which helps to secure and promote the conservation and protection of the park for the benefit of wildlife and the community. The Friends were established in 1999.
