= One Tree Hill, Honor Oak =

Hill in Southwark, London, England

One Tree Hill
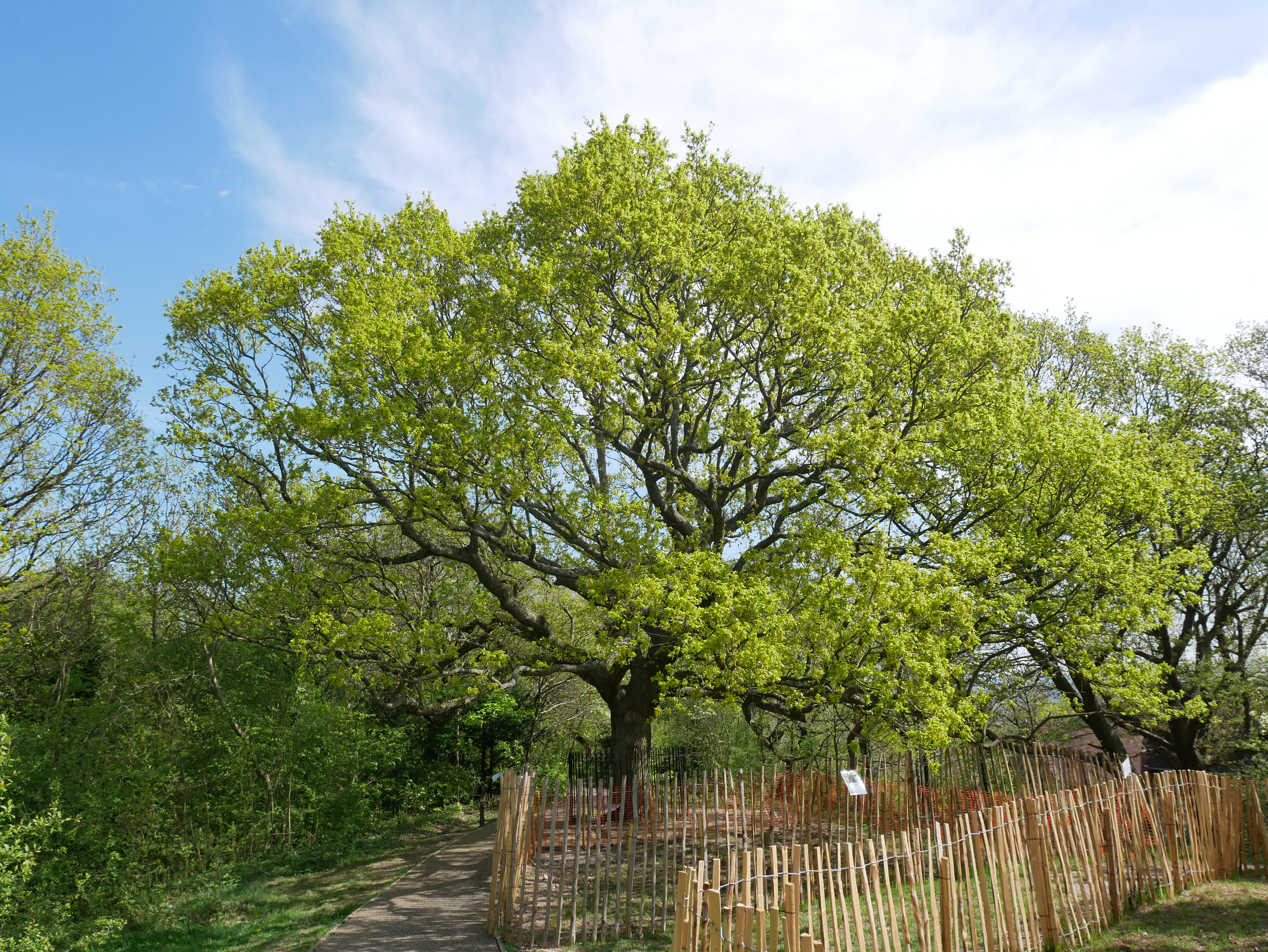
- The Oak of Honor
- Interactive map of One Tree Hill
- Type: Nature reserve
- Location: Honor Oak, London
- Coordinates: 51.4515°N 0.0513°W
- Operator: London Borough of Southwark

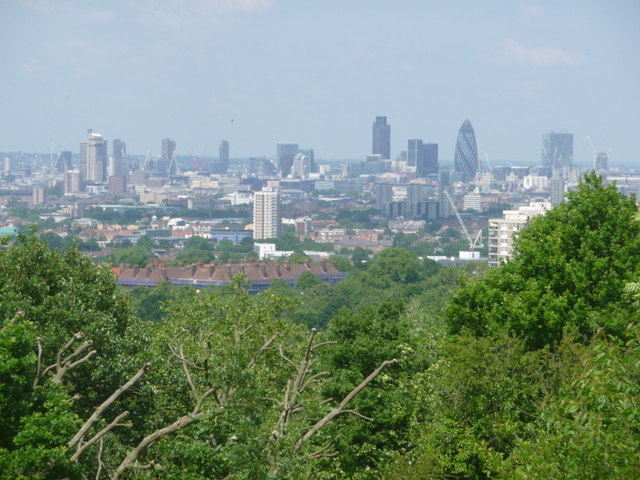
The view from One Tree Hill

One Tree Hill is a defining feature of Honor Oak, mostly in London Borough of Southwark but with parts also in the London Borough of Lewisham. It includes a 7 hectare public park, local nature reserve and Site of Borough Importance for Nature Conservation, Grade 1, which is owned and managed by Southwark Council. Its name, and that of the Honor Oak area, derive from the Oak of Honor, a tree on the hill which marked the southern boundary of the Norman Honour of Gloucester.

One Tree Hill was once a part of a much larger landscape called the Great North Wood. The London Wildlife Trust is currently working with Southwark Council and the Friends of One Tree Hill to improve the site for wildlife, as a part of its Great North Wood Project.

== History ==
The hill's Oak of Honor once marked the southern boundary of the Norman Honour of Gloucester. It was later owned by the Abbots of Bermondsey, until it was confiscated by the monarchy during the Dissolution of the Monasteries. According to legend, Queen Elizabeth I rested under an oak at the summit on her way to visit Lewisham in 1602. The current oak is the third on the site, planted in 1905.

Before the end of the eighteenth century, the East India Company built a semaphore station on the top of the hill to signal when ships were sighted in the Channel, and it was used as a beacon point by the Admiralty during the Napoleonic Wars. In 1896 the hill was fenced off by a local golf club, but this led to large scale protests, occupation and removal of the fences by local members of the Selborne Society and Society for the Protection of Birds (later the RSPB). In 1905 the site was compulsorily purchased by the new Camberwell Borough Council. The church of St Augustine was built on the north-east side of the hill between 1872 and 1900. It is fenced off from the public park. In 1957 John Betjeman described the view from the top as "better than that from Parliament Hill". Adjacent to the hill is the Honor Oak Reservoir, the largest underground brick reservoir in the world when finished in 1909, and it remains the largest in Europe.

== Ecology ==
The steep hill is wooded with open grassland at the top. The site has many ancient trees, but the main ones are hybrid black-poplar and London plane, the result of former landscaping. There are also wild service trees and midland hawthorns. The ground flora includes bluebells, heath grass and compact rush.

== Access ==
There is access from Honor Oak Park and Brenchley Gardens.
