= London Buses route 188 =

London bus route

188
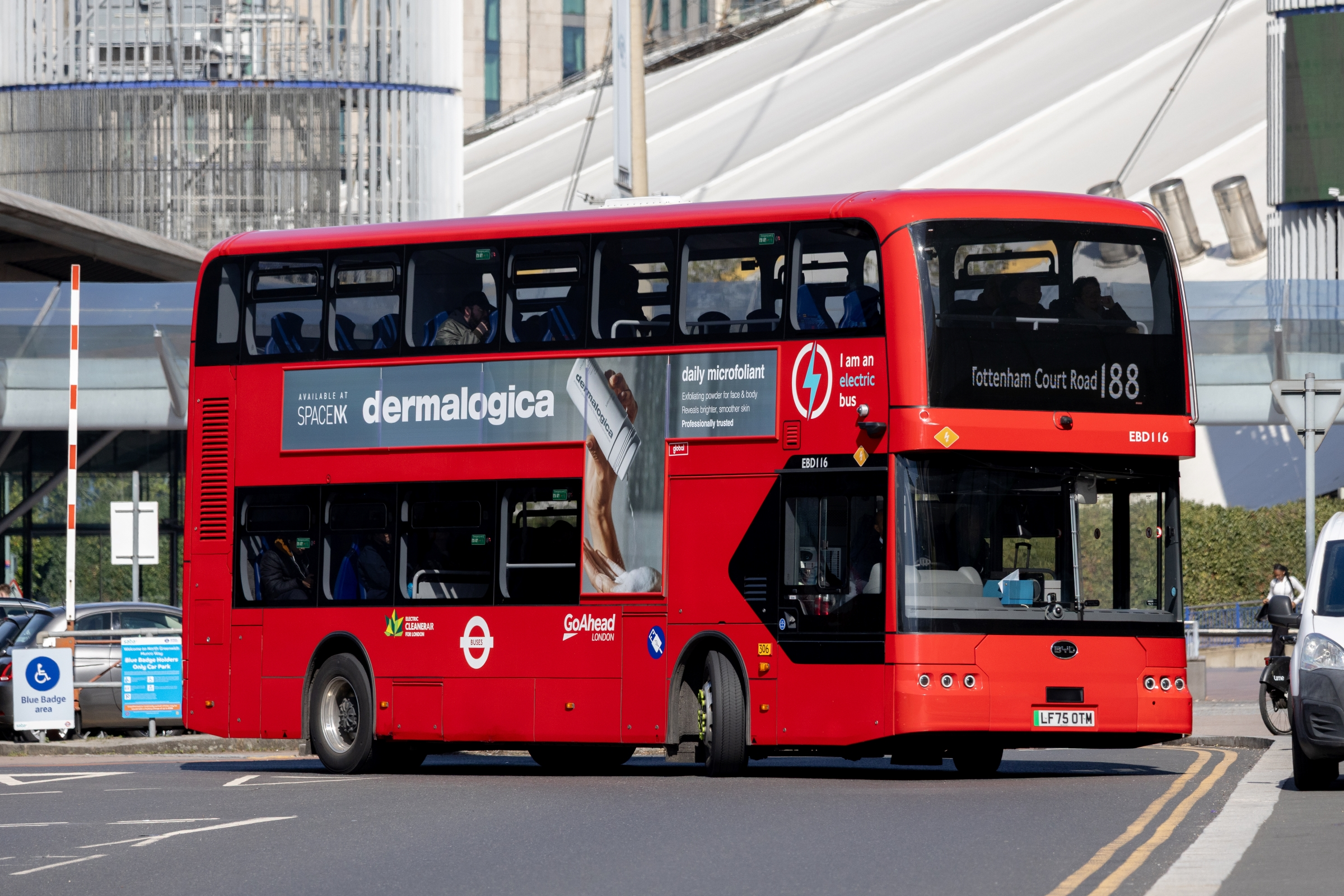
- London Central BYD BD11B on the Greenwich Peninsula in April 2026

Overview
- Operator: London Central (Go-Ahead London)
- Garage: Camberwell
- Vehicle: BYD BD11B
- Night-time: 24-hour service

Route
- Start: North Greenwich bus station
- Via: Canada Water; Bermondsey; Waterloo
- End: Tottenham Court Road station

London Buses route 188 is a Transport for London contracted bus route in London, England. Running between North Greenwich bus station and Tottenham Court Road station, it is operated by Go-Ahead London subsidiary London Central.

== History ==
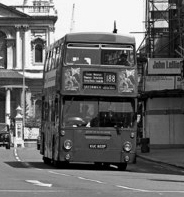
Daimler Fleetline on the Strand in June 1983

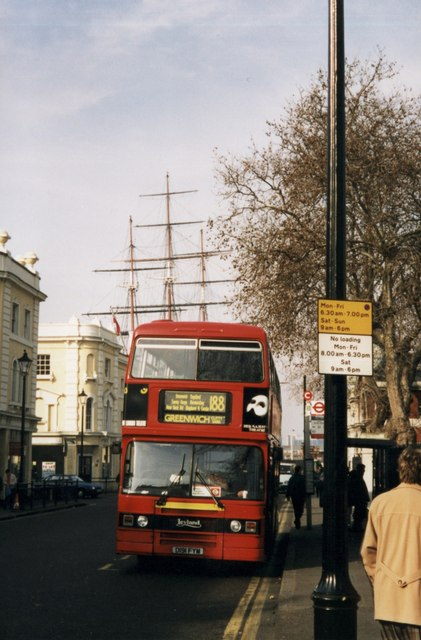
Cowie South London Leyland Titan in Greenwich in February 1998

London Central Wright Gemini 3 bodied Volvo B5LH

Upon being tendered in 1988, the route passed to Boro'line. Initially Leyland Atlanteans hired from Ipswich Buses and Daimler Fleetlines from Nottingham City Transport were used, until new Alexander bodied Volvo Citybuses were delivered in 1989. Boro'line operated from a depot in Crayford.

In November 1990, Boro'line surrendered the route, which consequently passed to London Buses subsidiary Selkent who operated it with Leyland Olympians from Plumstead garage. Upon retendering in 1993, the route changed operators again to London & Country, which was later purchased by the British Bus group. Reorganisation of the group's London operations saw the 188 move to the new Londonlinks subsidiary on its formation in 1995.

Route 188 was included in the sale of British Bus to the Cowie Group in August 1996. The contract to operate the route passed to Travel London in 2005.

On 28 July 2007, route 188 became a 24-hour service with a half-hourly service running throughout the night, seven days a week, passing through Bermondsey, Canada Water and Greenwich before terminating at The O2 Arena. The timetabling had been amended in order to meet the needs of visitors to The O2 where concerts continued until after the tube had closed.

Route 188 was included in the sale of Travel London to Abellio London in May 2009.

John Barry, head of network development for London buses, said: "The new 24-hour service on route 188 is another accessible transport connection for late-night travellers in the capital. London's night bus network has expanded dramatically in recent years with passenger numbers more than doubling since 2000." Despite this improvement, the route received 55 complaints from passengers in 2009, the fourth highest number on any route in London.

In 2011, it was announced that hybrid buses were to be introduced to the route.

On 6 November 2021, the frequency of the route was reduced from seven or eight buses per hour to six.

== Incidents ==
On 20 May 2008, one person was killed and 18 injured after a northbound 188 bus hit a low branch on a tree on the route. The woman killed was a passer-by, and the other injured passengers. The bus driver fainted shortly after the accident.

== Current route ==
Route 188 operates via these primary locations:

- North Greenwich bus station for North Greenwich station
- Maze Hill
- Greenwich Cutty Sark
- Deptford High Street
- Surrey Quays station
- Canada Water bus station for Canada Water station
- Rotherhithe
- Bermondsey station
- Bricklayers Arms
- Elephant & Castle station
- Waterloo station
- Aldwych
- Holborn station
- Tottenham Court Road station
