= Canada Water station =

London Underground and London Overground station

Canada Water
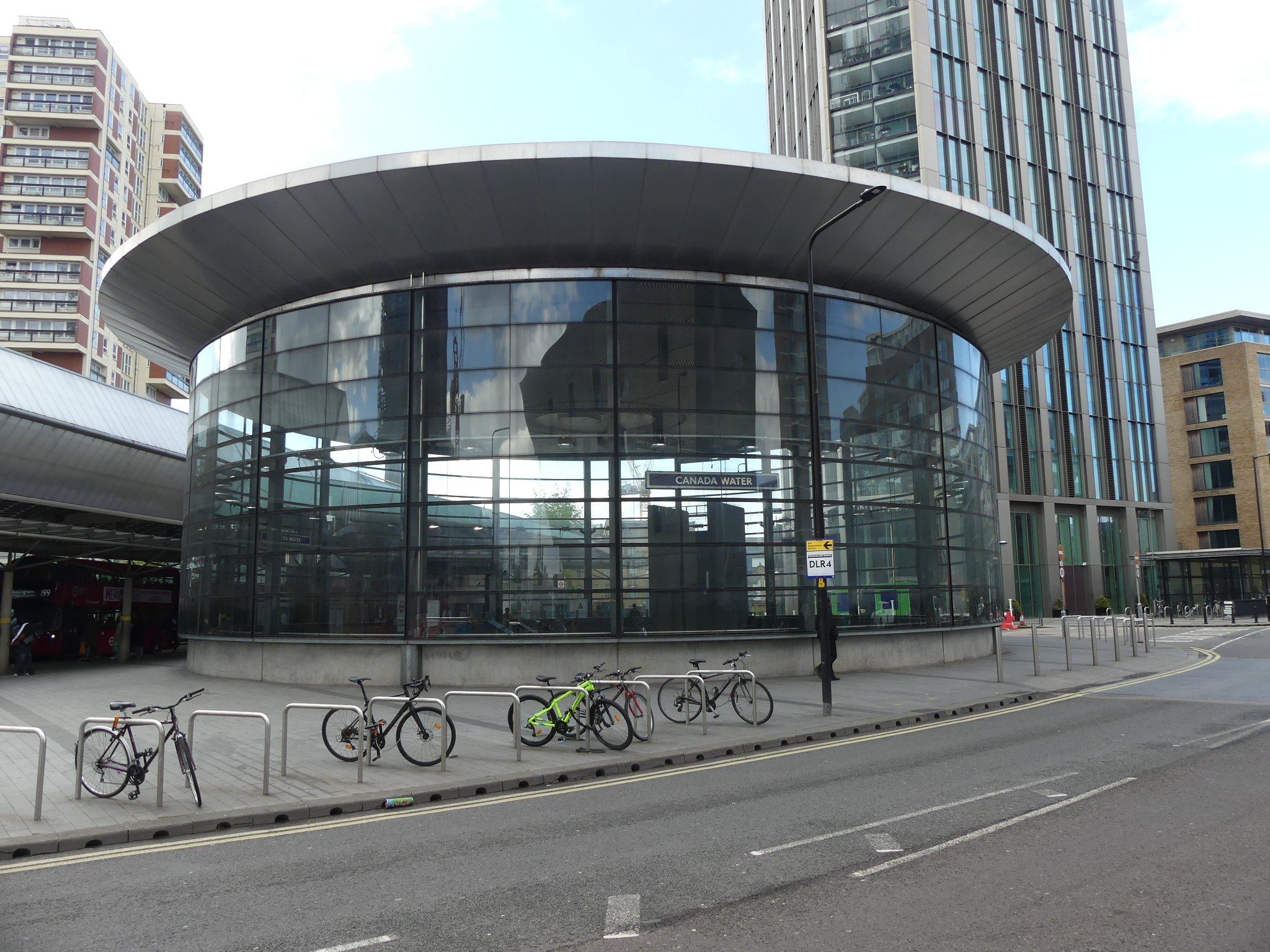
- Cylindrical main station entrance
- Interactive map of Canada Water

General information
- Location: Canada Water
- Local authority: London Borough of Southwark
- Managed by: London Underground
- Owner: Transport for London
- Station code: ZCW
- Number of platforms: 4
- Accessible: Yes
- Fare zone: 2

London Underground annual entry and exit
- 2021: ▼5.97 million
- 2022: ▲10.57 million
- 2023: ▼9.58 million
- 2024: ▲9.72 million
- 2025: ▼9.64 million

National Rail annual entry and exit
- 2020–21: ▼5.576 million
- 2021–22: ▲13.645 million
- 2022–23: ▲16.226 million
- Interchange: 914
- 2023–24: ▲17.517 million
- Interchange: ▲6,339
- 2024–25: ▲18.669 million
- Interchange: ▼3,719

Railway companies
- Original company: London Regional Transport

Key dates
- 19 August 1999: East London line opened
- 17 September 1999: Jubilee line opened
- 23 December 2007: East London line services as part of London Underground withdrawn
- 27 April 2010: East London line services as part of London Overground begin

Other information
- External links: TfL station info page; Departures; Facilities
- Coordinates: 51.498333°N 0.05°W

Canada Water is an interchange station in London. It is on the Jubilee line of the London Underground and the Windrush line of the London Overground, and is in London fare zone 2. The station is in Rotherhithe in the London borough of Southwark. It takes its name from Canada Water, a lake which was created from a former dock in the Port of London. London Overground services commenced on 27 April 2010, as the replacement extension of the historic East London tube line.

== History ==
Canada Water was originally intended to be a stop on the aborted Fleet line Extension to Thamesmead. The extension was never built, but Canada Water became the only projected Fleet line Extension station to be realised on the Jubilee Line Extension.

The station is a wholly new building on a derelict site formerly occupied by Albion Dock, part of the old Surrey Commercial Docks. The station was one of the first designed for the Jubilee line Extension. The contract for the station's construction was initially awarded to Wimpey in 1993 for £21.3 million and was later taken over by Tarmac. Construction began in 1995. It proved extremely challenging, requiring the excavation (by cut-and-cover) of a void 150 m (490 ft) long, 23 m (75 ft) wide and 22 m (72 ft) deep. The building of the East London line station required a separate slot at right angles, 130 m (430 ft) long, 13 m (43 ft) deep and tapering in width, incorporating a Victorian railway tunnel. Construction was complicated by the high water table on the site, which is located on the Thames flood plain; extensive deep-well dewatering was required to lower the water table before the enclosure to the excavations could be built. A total of 120,000 m^{3} (4,237,760 cu ft) of spoil had to be excavated. An additional complication was the location of the excavation site, near the foundations of two existing 22-storey tower blocks and the northern end of the former Canada Dock, now the ornamental lake Canada Water. The section of East London line running through the station was completely reconstructed, with the 19th-century brick railway tunnel being dismantled and the track relaid over a new structure bridging the Jubilee line tracks below. As the East London line had to be closed for this work, London Underground took the opportunity to carry out other remedial works such as repairs to the Thames Tunnel, a short distance to the north.

It was opened on 19 August 1999, served initially by East London line trains. The Jubilee line passenger service from the station began on 17 September that year.

In 2012, it was used as a filming location for part of the pilot episode of the BBC/Cinemax British-American spy drama, Hunted (TV series).

Canada Water was the first station to receive external sponsorship; Nestlé sponsored the station on the day of the 2015 London Marathon, and roundels in the station were edited to advertise Nestlé's Buxton Water. The one-day sponsorship was part of a plan to increase Transport for London's non-fare revenue, costing Nestlé £110,000.

== Architecture ==
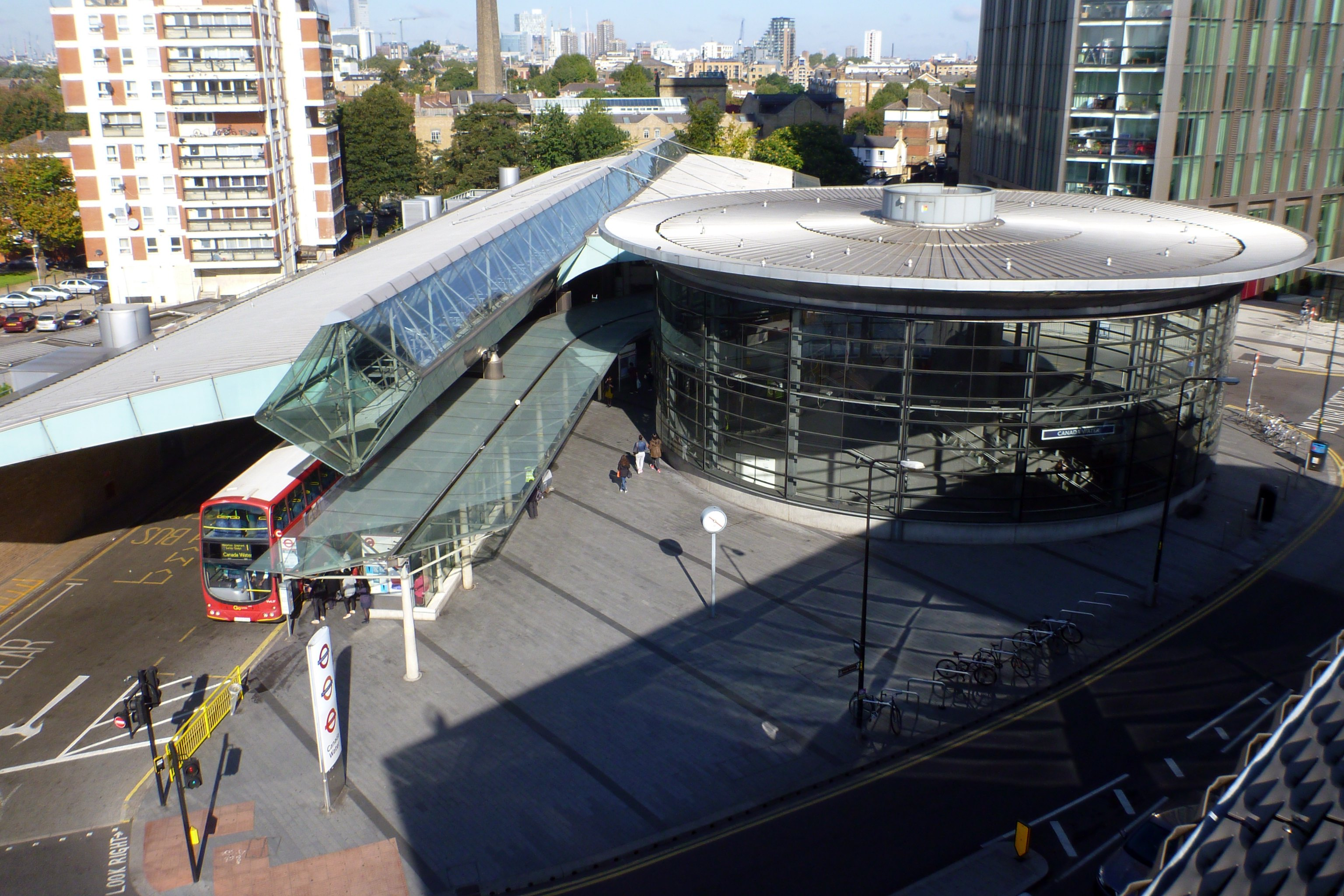
Station viewed from the roof of Canada Water library

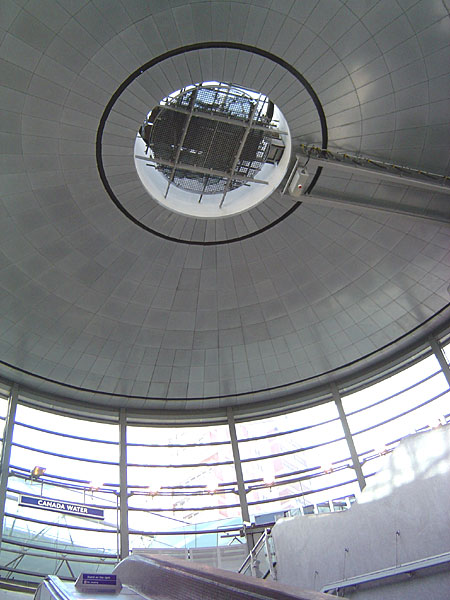
Below-ground view of the "drum"

Canada Water station

The station, which was the first to be designed in the Jubilee line Extension project, has been described by the project's commissioning architect Roland Paoletti, who was previously Hong Kong MTR's chief architect, "the only station on the JLE that has been built to the strict engineering economies of the specification of a Hong Kong interchange station." Above ground, its most salient feature is a striking glass "drum" 25 m (82 ft) across, which covers a deep opening descending almost to the Jubilee line platforms, 22 m (72 ft) below the surface. This feature was designed to allow natural light to reach deep into the station, a design principle common to many of the stations on the Jubilee line Extension. The drum was designed and constructed by Buro Happold. It is notably similar to the brick drum designed by Charles Holden for Arnos Grove station on the Piccadilly line in the 1930s, but is much more oriented towards the entry of daylight.

The drum is accompanied by a glass-roofed bus station designed by Eva Jiřičná which serves as a hub for services in the Rotherhithe and Bermondsey areas. The bus station was designed to fit in a relatively small site between the station drum, the railway's ventilation openings, a high wall and the adjoining tower blocks. Its most distinctive feature is a row of 16 m (52 ft)-long roof spans cantilevered from a row of central columns supporting a 100 m (330 ft)-long glass and aluminium canopy. This provides acoustic protection to the residential blocks and shelters passengers waiting below.

Below ground, the station is dominated by a huge concrete box, large enough to accommodate one of the Canary Wharf skyscrapers on its side. It is lined by a series of huge concrete pillars designed to take the weight of a planned nine-storey building on the surface as well as the roadway and bus station. The station has four lifts and eight escalators with an average rise of about 6.5 m (21 ft) to connect the lower parts of the station with street level. It is built on three levels: the ticket office and shops lie immediately below ground, the two north-south Windrush line platforms are situated on the second level 11 m (36 ft) below the ground, and the two east-west Jubilee line platforms are on the lowest level 22 m (72 ft) down.

The station was the winner of the Civic Trust Building of the Year Award for 2000, and the Interchange Awards' Medium Size Project of the Year award for 2001.

== Connections ==
London Buses routes 1, 47, 188, 199, 225, 381, C10, P12 and night routes N199 and N381 serve the station and bus station.

== Services ==
The station currently is served off peak during the day by 24 Jubilee line trains per hour, increasing to 30 in the peak, and 16 Windrush line trains per hour at all times. On Friday and Saturday nights, the station receives 6 Jubilee line trains per hour and 4 Windrush line trains per hour. Canada Water is the busiest two-platform National Rail station, with 25 million entries and exits to the Overground platforms in 2017–18.

There is a scissors crossover to the south of the London Overground platforms to enable trains to terminate there.

Preceding station	London Underground	Following station
Bermondsey towards Stanmore	Jubilee line	Canary Wharf towards Stratford
Preceding station	London Overground	Following station
Rotherhithe towards Dalston Junction or Highbury & Islington	Windrush line East London line and South London line	Surrey Quays towards Clapham Junction, Battersea Park, Crystal Palace, New Cross or West Croydon
Former Service
Preceding station	London Underground	Following station
Rotherhithe towards Shoreditch	East London line (1999-2007)	Surrey Quays towards New Cross or New Cross Gate
