= Bermondsey tube station =

London Underground station

Bermondsey
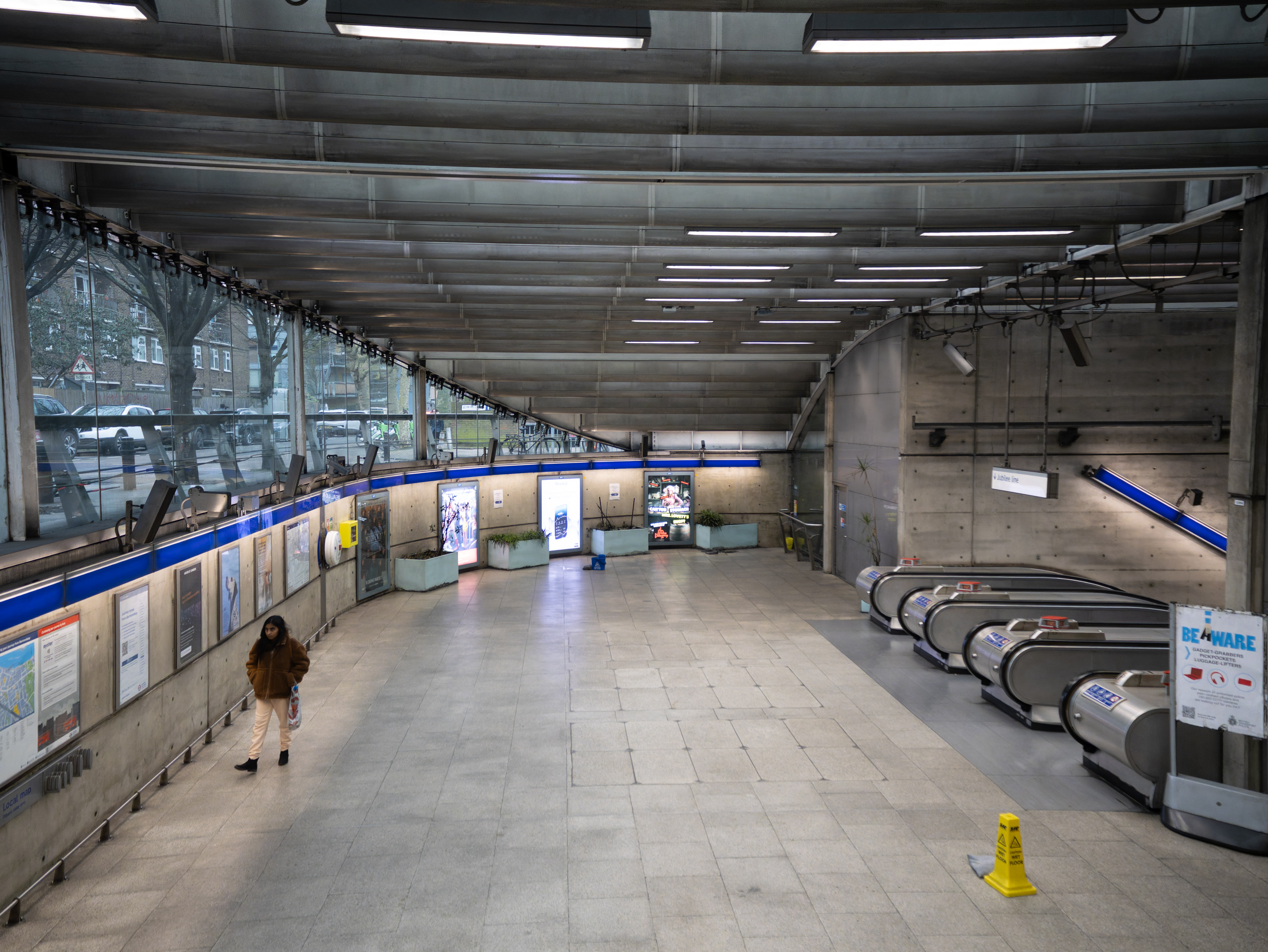
- Station interior
- Interactive map of Bermondsey

General information
- Location: Bermondsey
- Local authority: Southwark
- Managed by: London Underground
- Number of platforms: 2
- Accessible: Yes
- Fare zone: 2

London Underground annual entry and exit
- 2021: ▼4.18 million
- 2022: ▲6.68 million
- 2023: ▲6.80 million
- 2024: ▲7.01 million
- 2025: ▲7.04 million

Railway companies
- Original company: London Regional Transport

Key dates
- 17 September 1999: Opened

Other information
- External links: TfL station info page
- Coordinates: 51.49806°N 0.06389°W

Bermondsey (/ˈbɜːrməndzi/) is a London Underground station. It is located in the eastern part of Bermondsey in the London Borough of Southwark and also serves the western part of Rotherhithe, in south-east London.

The station itself was designed by Ian Ritchie Architects. Although it was originally intended to have a multi-storey office building on the top, London Underground have yet to realise the second phase of the scheme.

The station on the Jubilee line, having been built as part of the Jubilee Line Extension from 1999. It is between London Bridge (towards Stanmore) and Canada Water (towards Stratford) stations on the line. It is notable for its extensive use of natural light. The main station entrance is on the south side of Jamaica Road. The station is in London fare zone 2.

== History ==
The station was opened on 17 September 1999.

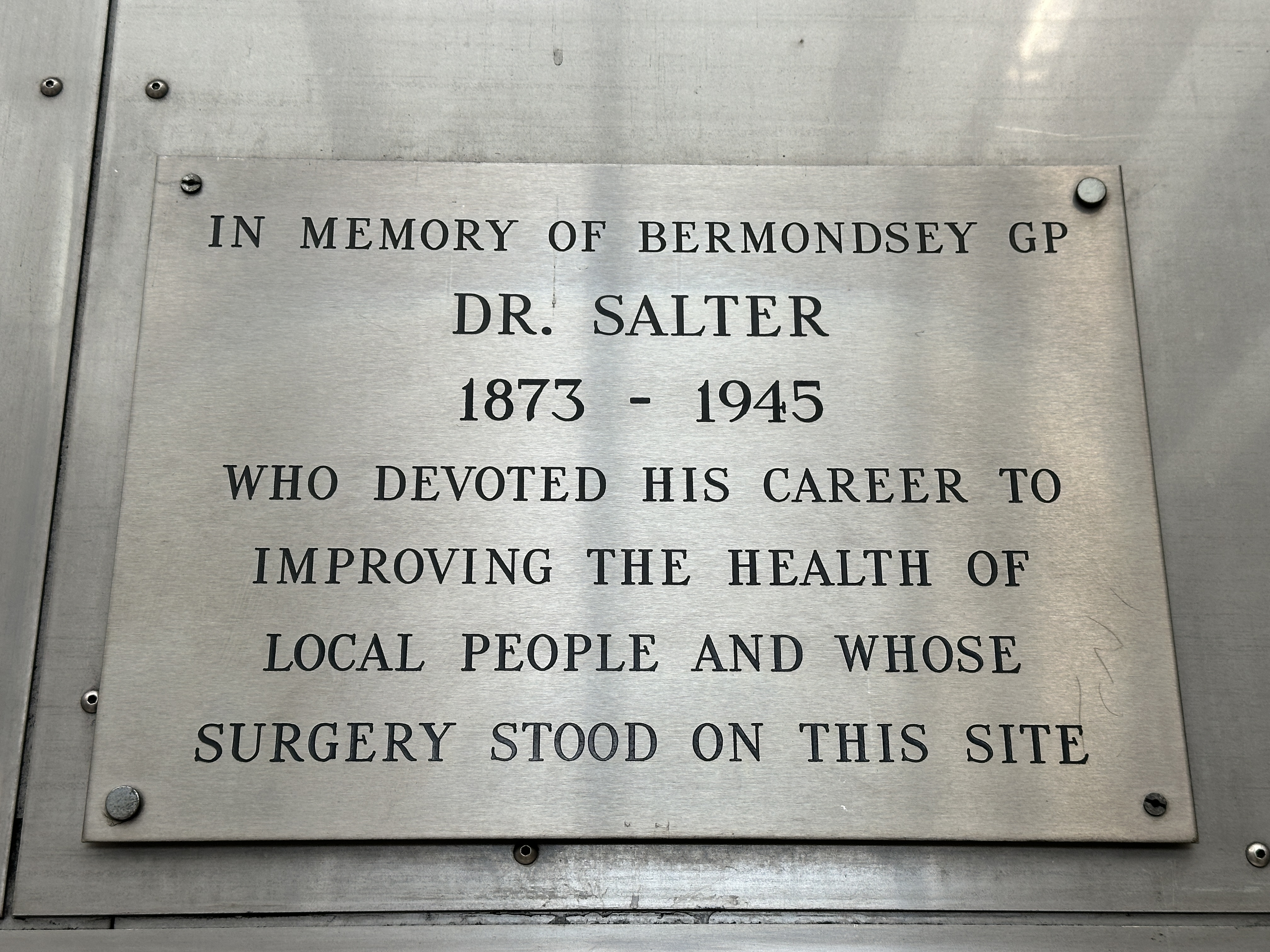
The Dr Salter memorial plaque

In 2002, a plaque to Dr Alfred Salter - who worked to improve the "living conditions of the poor in the Bermondsey area" in the 20th century - was unveiled by local MP Simon Hughes. The station had been built on the site of Salter's former doctors surgery.

== Design ==
Like its extension counterparts, Bermondsey station was designed with a futuristic style in mind by Ian Ritchie Architects. Extensively using natural light, it is built in both a cut-and-cover and tube design. The cut-and-cover section is supported by latticed concrete beams allowing light to penetrate to the platform level. The escalators down to this area are lined by flat concrete with a high ceiling to give a feeling of spaciousness. The bored section is encased with metal to keep in line the futuristic and metallic theme of the extension. As with all other deep level stations on the Jubilee Line Extension, Bermondsey station has platform screen doors for passenger safety and comfort.

== Connections ==
London Buses routes 47, 188, 381 and C10 and night routes N199 and N381 serve the station.

| Preceding station | London Underground | Following station |
|---|---|---|
| London Bridge towards Stanmore | Jubilee line | Canada Water towards Stratford |
