= Lavender Pond =

Nature reserve in Rotherhithe, London

Coordinates: 51.5058°N 0.03779°W

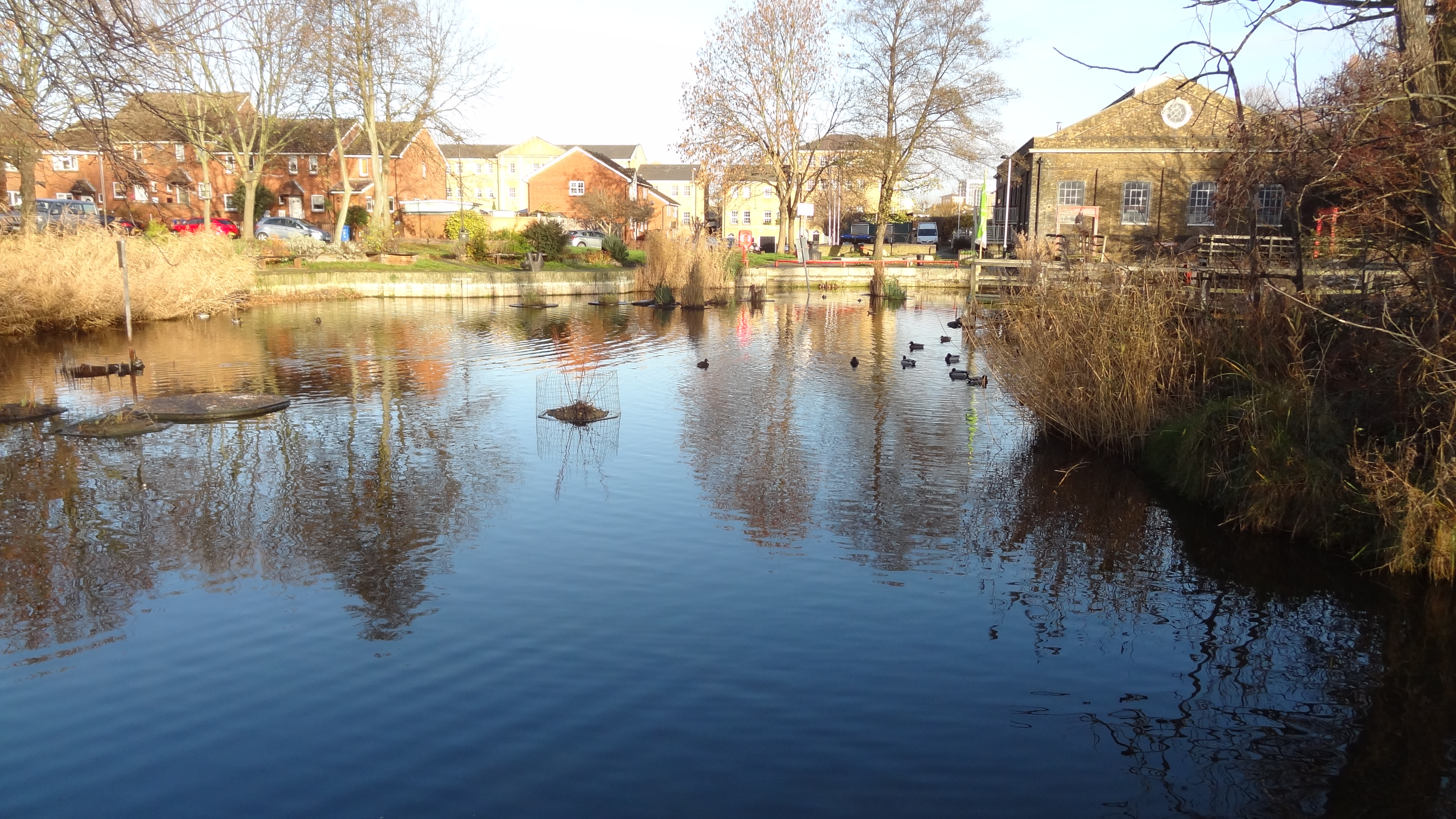
Lavender Pond

Lavender Pond is a 2.5 acre local nature reserve in Rotherhithe in the London Borough of Southwark. It is owned by Southwark Council and managed by The Conservation Volunteers. The nature reserve has an area of woodland as well as the pond.

== History ==
The site is in the northern end of the former Surrey Commercial Docks. The pond is a small part of the much larger former Lavender Pond, where timber was floated to prevent it drying and cracking. In 1928 the entrance to the pond was blocked when the Port of London Authority built the Pumphouse on the site to control the water levels in Surrey Docks. In 1970 the Docks were closed. The area became neglected and the pond was filled in, but in 1981 the pond was re-created as part of a nature reserve.

== Ecology ==
The reserve has the small wildlife pond, wet meadows and native trees have been planted in the woodland area. As well as an area for wildlife, the reserve aims to be a haven for local residents and an educational resource. Some areas are left undisturbed while others are used by schoolchildren.

== Pumphouse Educational Museum ==
The Pumphouse Educational Museum was located in the former pumphouse adjacent to the pond, and housed the Rotherhithe Heritage Museum and artefacts from the Thames shore from Roman times onwards. The museum was closed by the local council in 2011.

== Access ==
The pond is unfenced and there is access from Lavender Road and Salter Road, but the wood is kept locked and there is no public access.
