= The Conservation Volunteers =

British charity

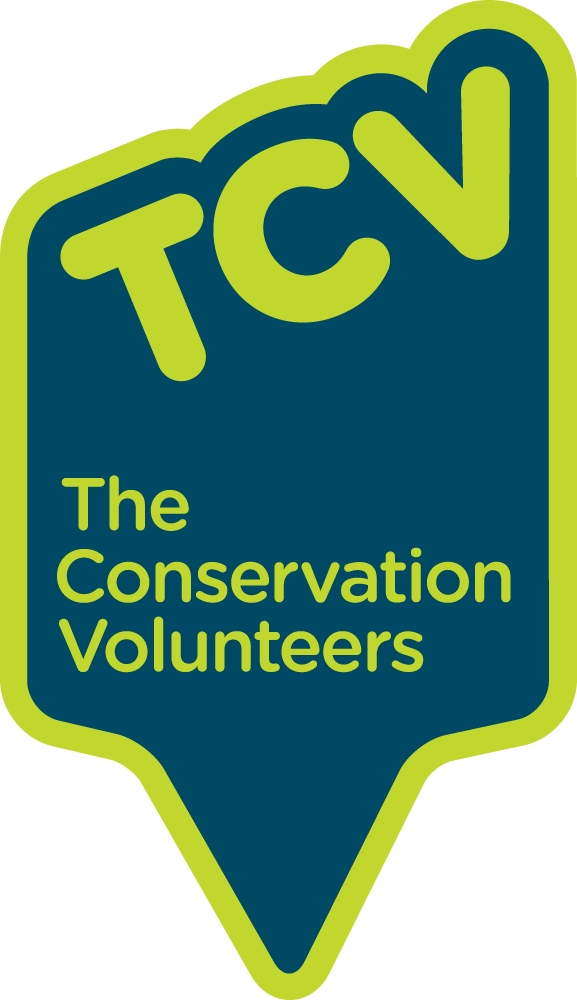
- The Conservation Volunteers logo
- Founded: 1959
- Type: Charity
- Registration no.: 261009 in England and Wales; SCO39302 in Scotland
- Purpose: Volunteering, Environment, Health & Wellbeing, Learning & Skills.
- Headquarters: Doncaster
- Location: Gresley House, Ten Pound Walk, Doncaster DN4 5HX, UK
- Region served: United Kingdom
- Key people: David Attenborough, TCV Vice President
- Revenue: £10.6m GBP (2023/24)
- Employees: 244
- Volunteers: c. 13,662
- Website: www.tcv.org.uk
- Formerly called: BTCV, British Trust for Conservation Volunteers

The Conservation Volunteers (TCV) is a British charity that connects people to green spaces through volunteering, focused on environmental conservation through practical tasks undertaken by volunteers. Until 1 May 2012, it traded as BTCV – British Trust for Conservation Volunteers).

== History ==
=== The Conservation Corps ===
In 1959 the (then) Council for Nature appointed Brigadier Armstrong to form the Conservation Corps, with the objective of involving young volunteers, over the age of 16, in practical conservation work. The corp's first project was at Box Hill, Surrey, where 42 volunteers cleared dogwood to encourage the growth of juniper and distinctive chalk downland flora. One of the volunteers present was David Bellamy, who went on to become a Vice President of BTCV.

By 1964 the Conservation Corps had expanded its activities to include education and amenity work in the countryside. In 1966 it moved from a basement office at Queens Gate, Kensington, to new premises at London Zoo in Regent's Park. In 1968 the first training course for volunteers was held. By 1969 membership had increased to 600, and volunteers completed around 6,000 workdays a year. The first ever international exchange visit to Czechoslovakia that year became the forerunner for the International Project Programme of today.

=== The British Trust for Conservation Volunteers ===
In 1970 the Conservation Corps started to operate under the new name of British Trust for Conservation Volunteers (BTCV), with Prince Philip as Patron and Sir David Attenborough as Vice President. In 1971 the local group affiliation scheme was launched.

- In 1975 the BTCV Membership scheme was started
- In 1984 BTCV moved its headquarters to Wallingford, Oxfordshire, while the former BTCV Scotland region was established as a separate charity, registered in Scotland and headquartered at Balallan House, Stirling. Operating under the new name of The Scottish Conservation Projects Trust (SCP), with Prince Charles as Royal Visitor, SCP continued the work of BTCV in Scotland until 31 March, 2002, when SCP ceased trading and BTCV resumed its former role in Scotland.
- In 1998, BTCV joins forces with Dr William Bird of Sonning Common Health Centre in Oxfordshire to introduce the BTCV Green Gym project.

=== BTCV ===
The organisation underwent a second change of identity in 2000, taking the initialism BTCV as its new name in full.

- In August 2006 BTCV moved to its present headquarters in Doncaster. The new "environmentally friendly" building features a sedum-covered roof – hence its name – Sedum House. The Scottish office is in Stirling and the Northern Ireland office in Belfast.

=== The Conservation Volunteers ===
In May 2012, BTCV rebranded under the trading name The Conservation Volunteers (TCV).

In 2014, TCV welcomed Sir Jonathon Porritt as President.

In 2024, His Majesty The King became The Conservation Volunteers' new Royal Patron.

== See also ==
- Green Gym
- Trust for Urban Ecology
