= Dulwich Upper Wood =

Local nature reserve in London, England

Coordinates: 51.424°N 0.078°W

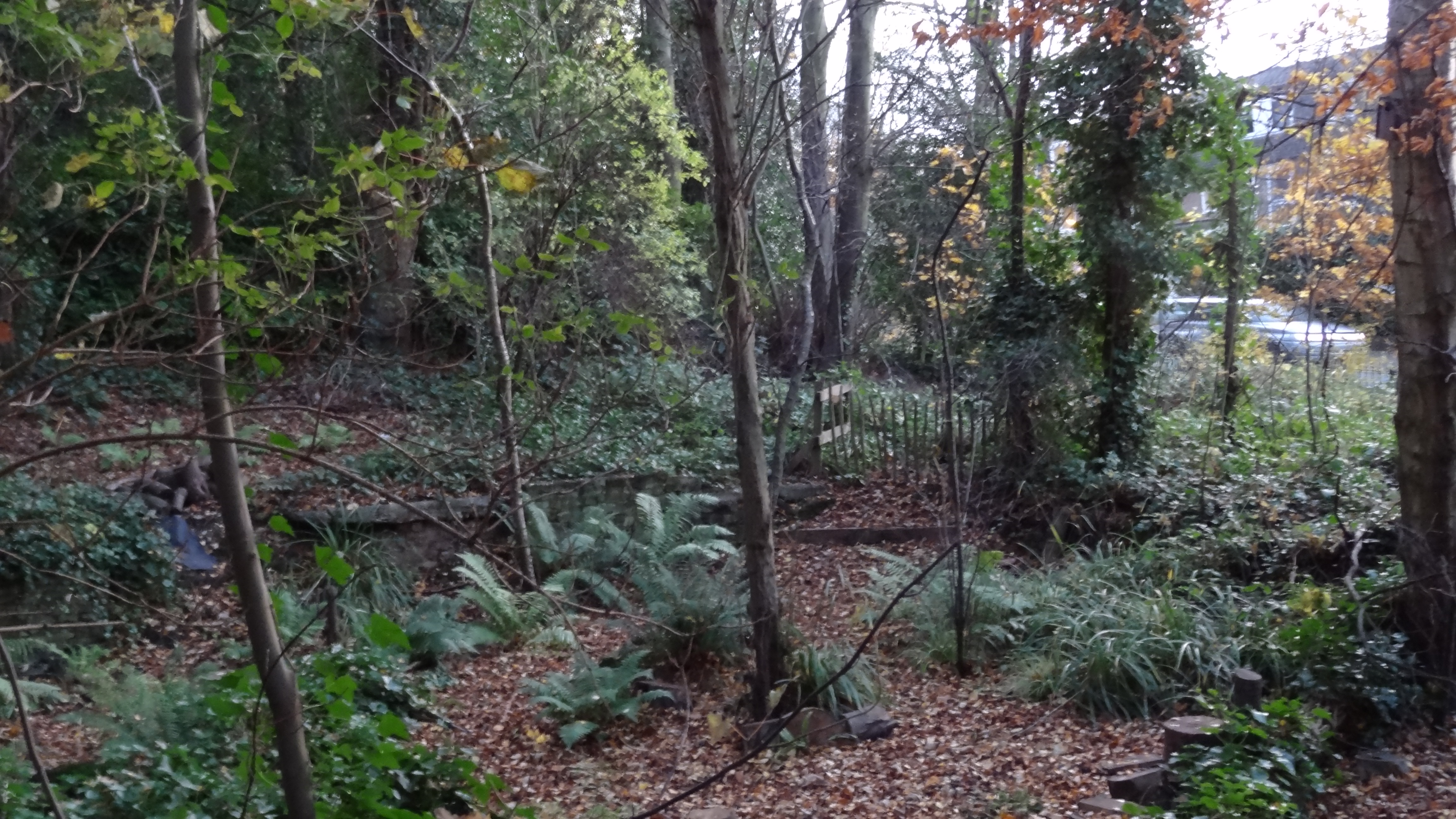

Dulwich Upper Wood is a 2.4 hectare local nature reserve and Site of Borough Importance for Nature Conservation, Grade 1, in Crystal Palace in the London Borough of Southwark. It is owned by Southwark Council and managed by the Trust for Urban Ecology.

== History ==
The wood was once part of the Great North Wood in the Manor of Dulwich. After the Great Exhibition of 1851 in Hyde Park closed, the building was moved and re-erected on Penge Common, adjoining the wood. The area was rapidly developed, becoming known as Crystal Palace, and what is now the wood became the gardens of large houses. After the Crystal Palace burnt down in 1936 the area declined, and the houses were eventually demolished, while the gardens became overgrown. In 1981 the wood was entrusted to the Ecological Parks Trust, now the Trust for Urban Ecology, as a nature reserve.

== Ecology ==
The site is mainly oak woodland, and some of the oak trees are over 300 years old. It also has many sycamores and other native trees, while some date from the Victorian gardens. There are over 200 species of fungus, and plants include wood anemones, bluebells, ramsons and yellow pimpernels. There is a wide variety of breeding birds.

== Access ==
There is access in two places on Farquhar Road, one opposite Dulwich Wood Avenue.
