= List of tallest buildings and structures in London =

Skyline of London
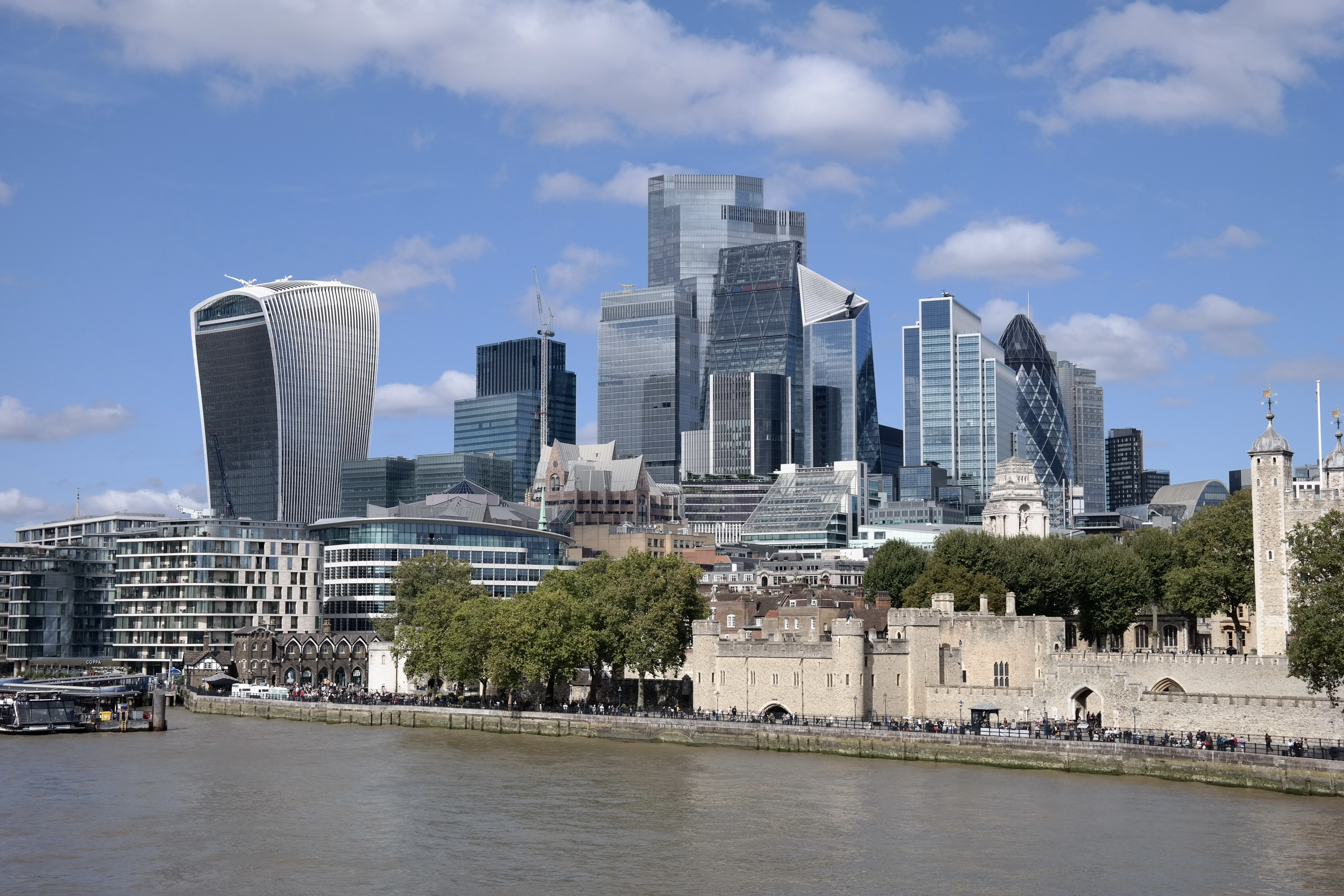
- The City of London skyline in 2024
- Tallest building: The Shard (2013)
- Tallest building height: 306 m (1,004 ft)
- Major clusters: City of London; Canary Wharf; Vauxhall/Nine Elms; Elephant and Castle; Stratford; See more
- First 150 m+ building: BT Tower (1965)

Number of tall buildings (2026)
- Taller than 100 m (328 ft): 133 + 5 T/O (Note: Topped-out.)
- Taller than 150 m (492 ft): 42 + 2 T/O
- Taller than 200 m (656 ft): 12
- Taller than 300 m (984 ft): 1

London is the capital and largest city of the United Kingdom. It has 133 completed buildings that are at least 100 metres (328 feet) tall as of 2026, 42 of which have a height greater than 150 metres (492 ft). London has one of the largest skylines in Europe; it has the most skyscrapers taller than 150 m (492 ft) in the United Kingdom and in Western Europe, and the third most of any city in Europe overall, after Moscow and Istanbul. London's skyline has undergone immense transformation in the early 21st century. Since 2013, the tallest building in London and the United Kingdom has been The Shard, London's only supertall skyscraper. The pyramid-shaped building in Southwark rises to a height of 306 m (1,004 ft). London has two primary skyscraper clusters: the City of London in central London, and Canary Wharf with the Isle of Dogs in East London, alongside numerous smaller groupings throughout Greater London.

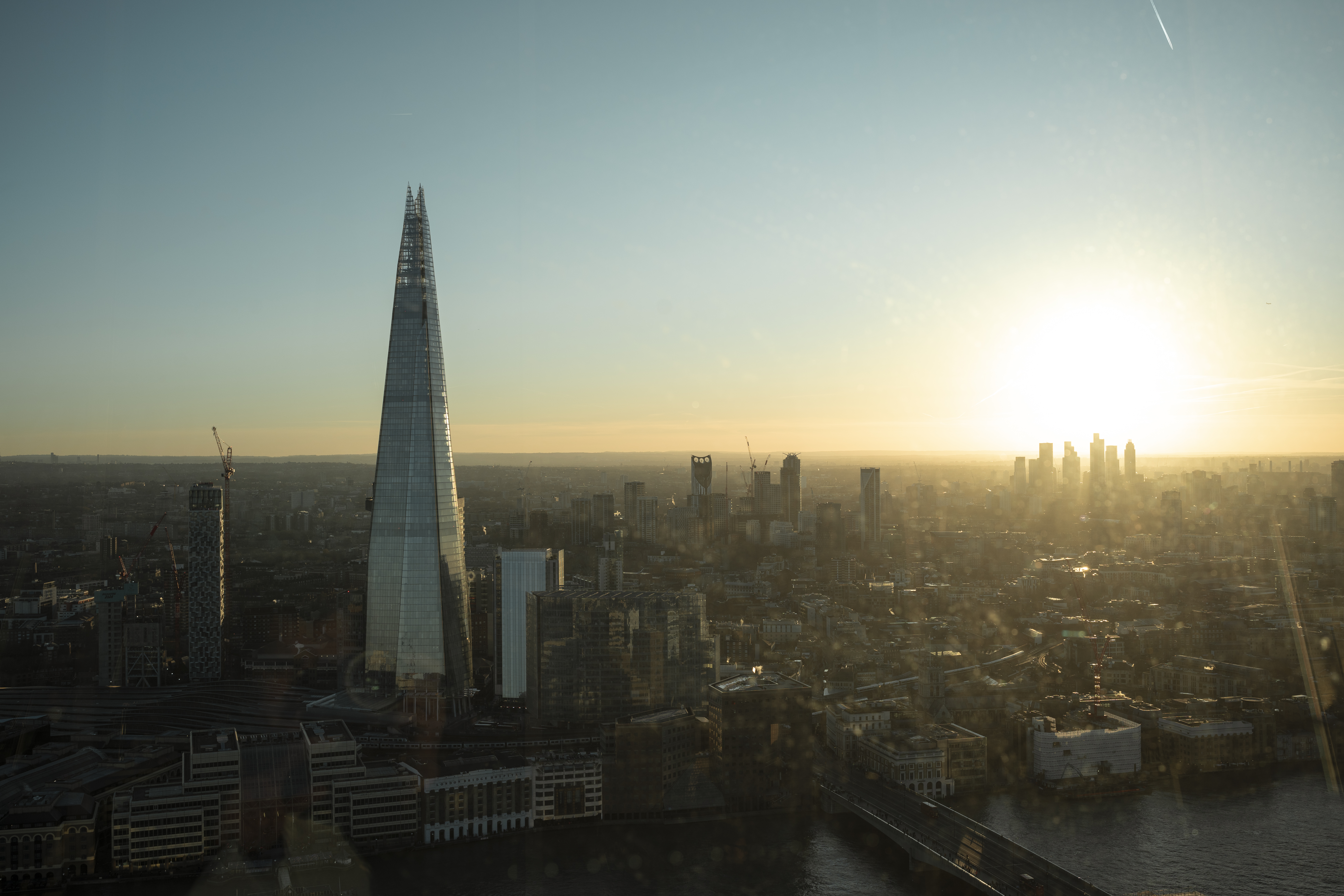
The Shard (left), with the skylines of Elephant and Castle (centre) and Vauxhall/Nine Elms (right) in 2025

For two centuries since 1710, St Paul's Cathedral was the tallest structure in London. While early skyscrapers sprouted in the late 19th and early 20th century in the United States, London—then the world's largest city—avoided this trend. In 1894, after work on the 12-storey Queen Anne's Mansions, the London Building Act imposed a height limit of 30 m (98 ft) or less across the city. This restriction was lifted in the 1950s, permitting the construction of high-rises taller than St Paul's. The destruction during The Blitz allowed more room for modern development. Early skyscrapers were built on the west side of central London, most notably the BT Tower in Fitzrovia in 1965. A concentration of tall buildings arose in the City of London, including office towers such as St Helen's and Tower 42, and Barbican Estate, a three-towered residential complex that is a prominent example of brutalism. The London Docklands in the Isle of Dogs, which had become disused in the 1960s, underwent a significant redevelopment plan in the 1980s, resulting in the financial district of Canary Wharf. Among the first skyscrapers built there was One Canada Square in 1991. At 236 m (774 ft), it surpassed Tower 42 to be London's tallest building; it is currently the city's third-tallest building and still the tallest in Canary Wharf.

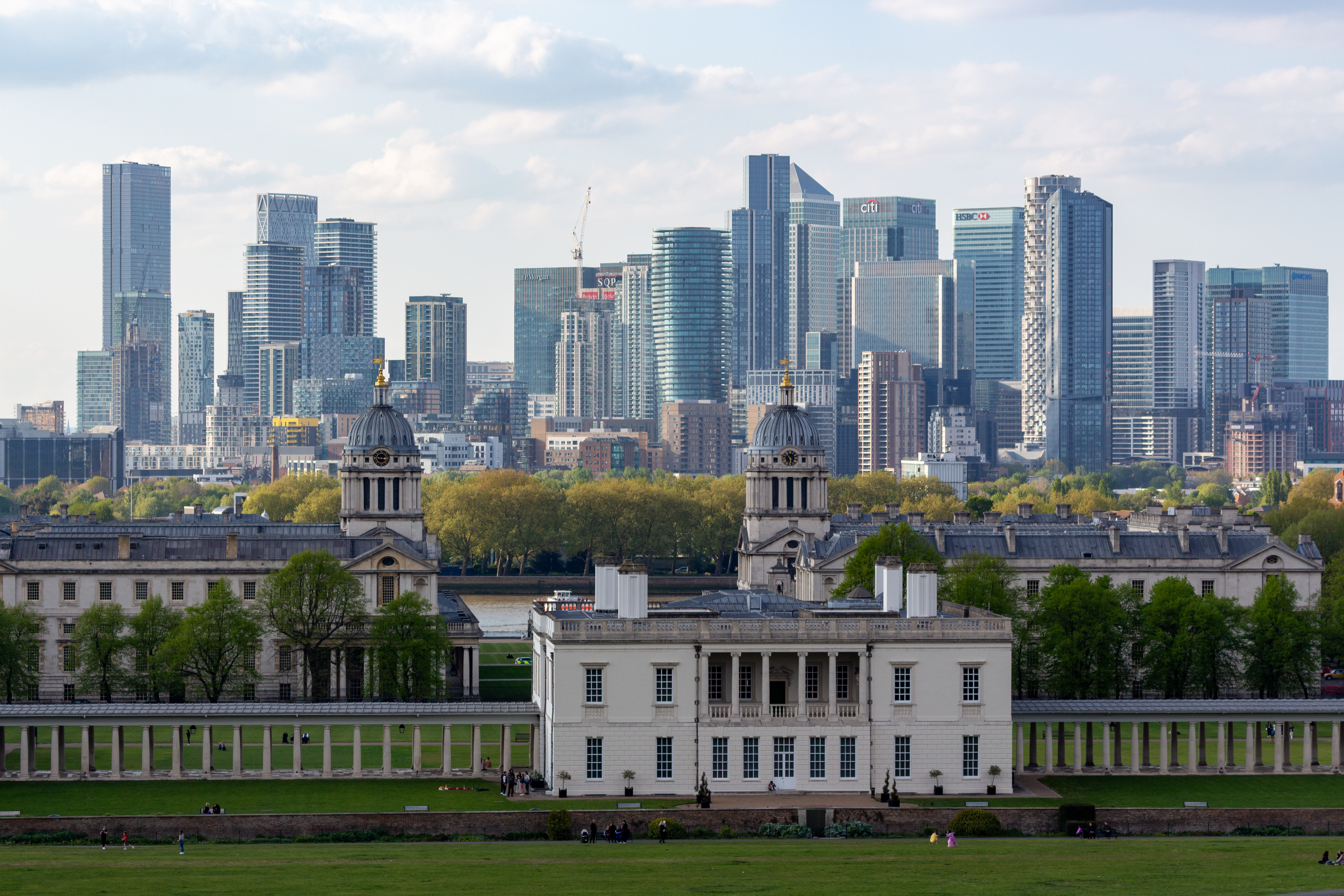
Canary Wharf from Greenwich Park in 2022

Since the 2000s, London has been experiencing a substantial skyscraper boom, which has accelerated in the late 2010s. This initially took place mostly in the City of London and Canary Wharf. The Gherkin, completed in 2004 in the City, is a recognised example of contemporary architecture. Further office skyscrapers in the City of London, such as 20 Fenchurch Street and 122 Leadenhall Street, have been given nicknames due to their distinctive shapes. The City of London's tallest building, 22 Bishopsgate, initially broke ground under the name The Pinnacle in 2008, but construction was halted in 2012. After a redesign, which removed the proposed curved-glass roof, it was completed in 2020. Numerous skyscrapers are planned for the City, including 1 Undershaft, which would be the tallest in the district, owing to high demand for grade-A office space. Canary Wharf has seen a major influx in residential skyscrapers since the 2010s, with the Wood Wharf neighbourhood expanding the skyscraper cluster eastwards.

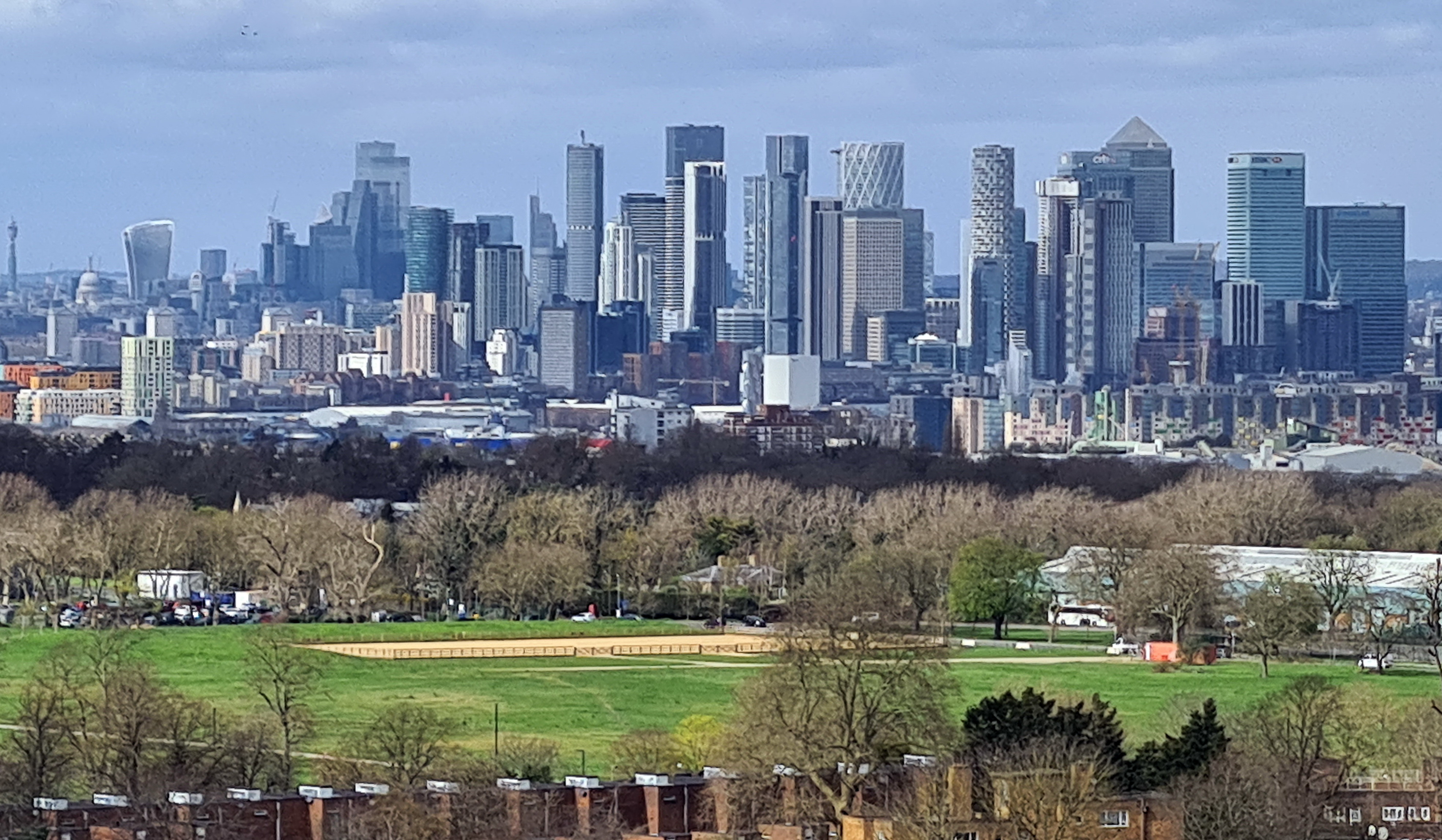
The City of London behind Canary Wharf in 2024

High-rises have increasingly proliferated across London since the 2010s, particularly in the areas of Vauxhall/Nine Elms, Elephant and Castle, and Stratford. The tallest buildings in each area (One Nine Elms City Tower, Highpoint, and Manhattan Loft Gardens respectively) have been built since 2018. This has been associated with residential regeneration efforts; in Stratford, development was spurred by the 2012 Summer Olympics. The New London Vernacular has influenced the design of these new towers. In the late 2010s and 2020s, this has extended to more areas across inner and outer London, most notably in Lewisham, Croydon, North Acton, and Wembley Park. One Blackfriars, completed in 2019 in the South Bank, will be accompanied by skyscrapers in the Bankside Yards project. Considerable residential high-rise development has also occurred in Barking, Blackwall, Canada Water, Canning Town, Greenwich Peninsula, Paddington, Poplar, Shoreditch, Silvertown, Southwark, Wandsworth, White City, and along City Road.

== History ==
Number of high-rise buildings in London by the end of each year, based on the information in this article. Non-building structures are excluded. Click on the legend to toggle a specific height on or off. View chart definition.

=== Medieval and early modern period ===
The history of tall structures in London began with the completion of the 27-metre (89 ft) White Tower, a part of the Tower of London, in 1098. The first structure to surpass a height of 100 metres (328 ft) was the Old St Paul's Cathedral. Completed in 1310, it stood at a height of 150 metres (492 ft). St Paul's was the world's tallest structure until 1311, when its height was surpassed by Lincoln Cathedral in Lincoln. It regained the title when the spire of Lincoln Cathedral fell in 1549.

Although the spire of the Old St Paul's was destroyed by lightning in 1561, it still stood as the tallest structure in London, while the world's tallest structure became Strasbourg Cathedral in Strasbourg, France. St Paul's was severely damaged by the Great Fire of London in 1666. The title of the tallest structure in London passed to Southwark Cathedral, which stands at a height of 50 metres (164 ft) and no structure in London again rose above 100 metres until 1710, when the current St Paul's Cathedral was completed at 111 metres (364 ft), becoming London's tallest building.

=== Late 1800s ===
Few skyscrapers were built in London before the late 20th century, owing to restrictions on building heights originally imposed by the London Building Act 1894 (57 & 58 Vict. c. ccxiii), which followed the construction of the 14-storey Queen Anne's Mansions. Though restrictions have long since been eased, harsh regulations remain to preserve protected views, especially those of St Paul's, the Tower of London and Palace of Westminster, as well as to comply with the requirements of the Civil Aviation Authority.

=== 1960s and 1970s ===
The lifting of height restrictions caused a boom in the construction of tall buildings during the 1960s. St Paul's Cathedral remained as London's tallest building until it was overtaken in 1963 by the Millbank Tower at 118 metres (387 ft), which in turn was overtaken by the BT Tower which topped out just one year later in 1964 at 177 metres (581 ft) and officially opened in 1965 (then known as the Post Office Tower). One of London's first notable tall buildings was the 117-metre (384 ft) Centre Point, completed in 1966.

Others completed in the 1960s include: the Empress State Building at 100 metres (328 ft) in 1961, the Shell Centre at 107 metres (351 ft) in 1961, the London Hilton at 101 metres (331 ft) in 1963, Portland House at 101 metres (331 ft) in 1963, and Euston Tower at 124 metres (407 ft) in 1970, all built on the west side of Central London. In 1969, St Helen's at 118 metres (387 ft) was completed in the City of London, along with Britannic House in 1967 at 122 metres (400 ft), but the latter was refurbished in 2000, increased to 127 m in height and renamed Citypoint. Cromwell Tower, completed in 1973, Lauderdale Tower, completed in 1974 and Shakespeare Tower, completed in 1976, all at 123 metres (404 ft), were built as part of the Barbican Estate in the northern part of the City of London.

=== 1980s, 1990s and 2000s ===
The NatWest Tower, later renamed Tower 42, was completed in 1980, which at 183 metres (600 ft) and 42 storeys, was considered the first "skyscraper" in the City of London. Its height was controversial, being contrary to the previous height restrictions, it was the tallest building in the United Kingdom at the time and also the tallest cantilever building in the world. Following an over ten-year gap, One Canada Square was completed in 1991 at 235 metres (771 ft) and formed the centrepiece of the Canary Wharf development, which itself is part of the Isle of Dogs and can be considered the east-side of Central London. At 50 storeys, it became the tallest building in the United Kingdom.

With the encouragement of Ken Livingstone who was Mayor of London from 2000 to 2008, a renewed trend for building tall was established in the 2000s.

Following another over 10-year gap, 8 Canada Square and 25 Canada Square, both standing at about 200 metres (660 ft), were completed at Canary Wharf in 2002. Several others of a smaller height followed at Canary Wharf including: Heron Quays, 40 Bank Street in 2003 at 153 metres (502 ft), 10 Upper Bank Street in 2003 at 151 metres (495 ft), and 25 Bank Street in 2004 at 153 metres (502 ft). In the City of London, The Gherkin was completed in 2003 at 180 metres (590 ft), the Broadgate Tower in 2008 at 165 metres (541 ft), and Heron Tower in 2011 at 230 metres (750 ft). Notably, some of the awards given to 30 St Mary Axe (The Gherkin) include the Emporis Skyscraper Award in 2003 and the RIBA Stirling Prize for Architecture in 2004.

=== 2010s to present ===
Boris Johnson, who was Mayor of London from 2008 to 2016, approved the construction of more skyscrapers in London.

At the time of its completion in 2010, Strata SE1 was the tallest residential building in London. The Shard topped out in 2012 at London Bridge and at 309.6 metres (1,016 ft) remains London's tallest building. In 2014, the 225 metres (738 ft) tall 122 Leadenhall Street, nicknamed "the Cheesegrater", was completed in the City of London. In September 2016, a refit was completed of the 111 m King's Reach Tower, originally built in the 1970s, which included an 11-storey height increase to bring it up to 150 metres (490 ft) tall and it was renamed the South Bank Tower.

One Blackfriars, also located on the South Bank, topped out in 2017 at 163 metres (535 ft). The Scalpel, at 190 metres (620 ft) was completed in the City of London in 2018 and it was designed to protect views of St Paul's Cathedral. Newfoundland Quay, at 220 metres (720 ft) and Landmark Pinnacle at 233 metres (764 ft) topped out in Canary Wharf in 2018 and 2019 respectively. One Park Drive at 205 metres (673 ft) and South Quay Plaza at 215 metres (705 ft) both also topped out at Canary Wharf in 2019. 22 Bishopsgate, at 278 metres (912 ft) topped out in the City of London in 2019, after being approved by the current mayor of London, Sadiq Khan, in 2016.

1 Undershaft, at 290 metres (950 ft), also approved by Sadiq Khan in 2016, is planned to form the centrepiece of the City of London's skyscraper cluster. It is the tallest skyscraper currently proposed for London and will only be exceeded in height by The Shard. It will be built on the site of the aforementioned 1969 St Helen's building which is currently being demolished. 100 Leadenhall, at 249 metres (817 ft), and already nicknamed the "Cheesegrater 2", is also planned for the City of London. Spire London, at 235 metres (771 ft) is planned for Canary Wharf. However, construction was halted after concerns that the building only had one escape stairwell for residents on the upper floors. The tallest of the two Riverside South towers that have been planned for construction at Canary Wharf since 2008 would have exceeded that cluster's tallest building, One Canada Square, by one metre in height, but construction has been stalled since 2011. The 216 metres (709 ft) tall Aspen at Consort Place (previously called Alpha Square), also at Canary Wharf, opened in 2025.

There is another major skyscraper cluster emerging in the Vauxhall and Nine Elms districts of London. The first skyscraper to appear here was St George Wharf Tower at 181 metres (594 ft) and which was completed in 2014. The tallest tower in the cluster is the 200 metres (660 ft) One Nine Elms City Tower completed in 2022. Other notable skyscrapers in the district include One Thames City No. 8 at 177 metres (581 ft), and the DAMAC Tower at 168 metres (551 ft).

In 2019, Sadiq Khan blocked the construction of the 290-metre-tall (950 ft) Tulip that would have been built in the City of London. After an appeal was launched by the developers against Khan's decision, UK housing secretary Michael Gove rejected the proposal in November 2021.

== Map of tallest buildings ==
The map below shows the distribution of high-rise buildings taller than 100 m (328 ft) in London. High-rise clusters with two or more buildings taller than 100 m (328 ft) are labelled in bold. The scope of this map excludes several high-rise clusters in Outer London, namely Croydon, Ilford, Tottenham Hale, Walthamstow, and Woodberry Down.

Buildings taller than 100 m (328 ft) in London.

=== City of London & Shoreditch ===
The map below shows a portion of the above map in Central London, centered on the City of London. Each marker is numbered by the building's height rank within the map, and colored by the decade of its completion.

Buildings taller than 100 m (328 ft) in the City of London and Shoreditch.
- 1960s
- 1970s
- 1980s
- 1990s
- 2000s
- 2010s
- 2020s
1 22 Bishopsgate
2 Heron Tower
3 122 Leadenhall Street
4 8 Bishopsgate
5 The Scalpel
6 Tower 42
7 The Gherkin
8 100 Bishopsgate
9 1 Leadenhall Street
10 Broadgate Tower
11 Principal Tower
12 20 Fenchurch Street
13 40 Leadenhall Street
14 One Bishopsgate Plaza
15 20 Ropemaker Street
16 CityPoint
17 The Stage
18 Willis Building
19 One Crown Place South
20 Cromwell Tower
21 Lauderdale Tower
22 Shakespeare Tower
23 St Helen's
24 The Heron
25 Chapter Spitalfields
26 99 Bishopsgate
27 One Crown Place North
28 Pioneer Point North
29 One Angel Court

=== Canary Wharf and Isle of Dogs ===
The map below shows the location of buildings taller than 100 m (328 ft) in Canary Wharf and Blackwall. Each marker is numbered by the building's height rank within the map, and colored by the decade of its completion.

Buildings taller than 100 m (328 ft) in Canary Wharf and surrounding areas.
- 1990s
- 2000s
- 2010s
- 2020s
1 One Canada Square
2 Landmark Pinnacle
3 Newfoundland
4 Aspen at Consort Place
5 South Quay Plaza 1
6 One Park Drive
7 25 Canada Square
8 8 Canada Square
9 Harcourt Gardens
10 Wardian London East Tower
11 Amory Tower
12 40 Charter Street
13 Wardian London West Tower
14 50–60 Charter Street Tower 1
15 One Thames Quay
16 One Churchill Place
17 25 Bank Street
18 40 Bank Street
19 10 Upper Bank Street
20 Baltimore Tower
21 10 Park Drive
22 Pan Peninsula East Tower
23 Maine Tower
24 One Bank Street
25 24 Marsh Wall East Tower
26 Charrington Tower
27 10 George Street
28 Sirocco Tower
29 Pan Peninsula West Tower
30 Alta at Consort Place
31 40 Marsh Wall
32 25 Churchill Place
33 50-60 Charter Street Tower 2
34 Dollar Bay
35 1 West India Quay
36 Ontario Tower
37 33 Canada Square

== Tallest buildings and structures ==
This list ranks complete and topped-out skyscrapers and free-standing towers in London that stand at least 100 m (328 ft) tall as of 2026, based on standard height measurement. This includes spires and architectural details but does not include antenna masts. The "Year" column indicates the year in which a building was completed. If two or more structures are tied in height, the earlier structure is ranked first.

Was the tallest structure in London overall upon completion
Was the tallest high-rise building in London upon completion
Topped out but not yet completed

| Rank | Name | Image | Location | Height m (ft) | Floors | Year | Purpose | Notes |
|---|---|---|---|---|---|---|---|---|
| 1 | The Shard | | Southwark 51°30′16″N 0°05′12″W | 309.6 (1,016) | 72 | 2013 | Mixed-use | Tallest building and only supertall skyscraper in the United Kingdom and Western Europe. Tallest building in Europe by roof height outside of Russia. Mixed-use residential, hotel, and office building. |
| 2 | 22 Bishopsgate | | City of London 51°30′52″N 0°04′58″W | 278.2 (913) | 62 | 2020 | Office | Tallest building in the City of London. |
| 3 | One Canada Square | | Canary Wharf / Isle of Dogs 51°30′18″N 0°01′10″W | 236 (774) | 50 | 1991 | Office | Tallest building in the Canary Wharf business district. Tallest building and structure in London from 1991 to 2013. |
| 4 | Landmark Pinnacle | | Canary Wharf / Isle of Dogs 51°30′10″N 0°01′32″W | 233.2 (765) | 77 | 2020 | Mixed-use | Mixed-use residential and hotel building. |
| 5 | Heron Tower | | City of London 51°30′58″N 0°04′52″W | 230 (755) | 46 | 2011 | Office | Only 202 m (663 ft) at roof height, but includes a 28 m (92 ft) mast. Also known as Salesforce Tower. |
| 6 | 122 Leadenhall Street | | City of London 51°30′50″N 0°04′57″W | 224.5 (737) | 52 | 2014 | Office | Also known as "The Leadenhall Building". Second tallest building in the City of London. Nicknamed "The Cheesegrater" due to its wedge shape. |
| 7 | Newfoundland | | Canary Wharf / Isle of Dogs 51°30′16″N 0°01′31″W | 219.7 (721) | 59 | 2020 | Residential | |
| N/A | Crystal Palace; Transmitter | | Crystal Palace 51°25′27″N 0°04′30″W | 219 (719) | N/A | 1950 | Transmitter | Tallest structure in London completed in the 1950s. |
| 8 | Aspen at Consort Place | | Canary Wharf / Isle of Dogs 51°30′04″N 0°01′22″W | 215.8 (708) | 67 | 2024 | Residential | Previously named Alpha Square. Approved in April 2016. Topped out in September 2023. |
| 9 | South Quay Plaza 1 | | Canary Wharf / Isle of Dogs 51°30′04″N 0°01′02″W | 214.5 (704) | 68 | 2020 | Residential | Approved in November 2014. Also known as Valiant Tower. |
| 10 | One Park Drive | | Canary Wharf / Isle of Dogs 51°30′08″N 0°00′54″W | 204.9 (672) | 58 | 2021 | Residential | Part of the Wood Wharf development as the Wood Wharf A1 building. Approved in July 2015. |
| 11 | 8 Bishopsgate | | City of London 51°30′50″N 0°05′00″W | 203.7 (668) | 51 | 2023 | Office | Approved in 2017. Construction commenced in March 2019. Topped out in September 2022. |
| 12 | 25 Canada Square | | Canary Wharf / Isle of Dogs 51°30′15″N 0°01′04″W | 201 (659) | 42 | 2002 | Office | Also known as the Citigroup Tower. Currently undergoing refurbishment, to be completed in 2025. |
| 13 | 8 Canada Square | | Canary Wharf / Isle of Dogs 51°30′19″N 0°01′03″W | 199.5 (655) | 42 | 2002 | Office | Also known as the HSBC Tower. |
| 14 | One Nine Elms City Tower | | Vauxhall / Nine Elms 51°29′04″N 0°07′38″W | 199.4 (654) | 57 | 2023 | Residential | Tallest building in Vauxhall/Nine Elms. |
| 15 | Harcourt Gardens | | Canary Wharf / Isle of Dogs 51°30′03″N 0°01′07″W | 192.4 (631) | 56 | 2024 | Residential | Initially rejected on 12 May 2016, but granted planning permission in July 2016. |
| 16 | The Scalpel | | City of London 51°30′48″N 0°04′52″W | 190.1 (624) | 39 | 2018 | Office | The Scalpel was originally a nickname, referencing the building's angular design, but was later designated the official name. Resembles a "play" media button when viewed from certain angles. |
| 17 | Wardian London; East Tower | | Canary Wharf / Isle of Dogs 51°30′06″N 0°01′20″W | 187.2 (614) | 55 | 2020 | Residential | Application in January 2013, approved in November 2014. |
| 18 | One West Point Tower 1 | | North Acton 51°31′20″N 0°15′42″W | 184 (604) | 52 | 2022 | Residential | Part of the Portal West development. Also known as Icon Tower. |
| 19 | Tower 42 | | City of London 51°30′55″N 0°05′02″W | 182.9 (600) | 43 | 1980 | Office | Tallest structure in London completed in the 1980s. Tallest building in London from 1980 to 1991. Formerly known as the NatWest Tower. |
| 20 | Amory Tower | | Canary Wharf / Isle of Dogs 51°30′01″N 0°00′49″W | 182 (597) | 55 | 2021 | Mixed-use | Formerly known as Meridian Gate and The Madison. Mixed-use residential and office building. Approved in 2015. |
| 21 | St George Wharf Tower | | Vauxhall / Nine Elms 51°29′06″N 0°07′41″W | 180.6 (593) | 52 | 2014 | Residential | Tallest building in Vauxhall/Nine Elms from 2014 to 2023. The crown of the building includes a small wind turbine which helps to generate power for the building. |
| 22 | The Gherkin | | City of London 51°30′52″N 0°04′49″W | 179.8 (590) | 40 | 2004 | Office | Known officially as 30 St Mary Axe. Formerly known as the Swiss Re Building. The Gherkin is a nickname, a reference to its pickle-like shape. |
| 23 | 40 Charter Street | | Canary Wharf / Isle of Dogs 51°30′07″N 0°00′44″W | 178.6 (586) | 53 | 2027 | Residential | Updated application approved in February 2022. Topped out in 2025. |
| 24 | BT Tower | | Fitzrovia 51°31′17″N 0°08′20″W | 177.4 (582) | 37 | 1965 | Communication | Tallest building in London completed in the 1960s. Tallest building in London from 1965 to 1980. Tallest building in Fitzrovia and the borough of Camden. Also used for offices. Sold in 2024 to MCR Hotels. |
| 25 | One Thames City No. 8 | | Vauxhall / Nine Elms 51°28′59″N 0°07′40″W | 176 (577) | 54 | 2022 | Residential | Planning application in 2014. |
| 26 | 100 Bishopsgate | | City of London 51°30′57″N 0°04′53″W | 171.6 (563) | 40 | 2019 | Office | |
| 27 | DAMAC Tower Nine Elms | | Vauxhall / Nine Elms 51°29′03″N 0°07′28″W | 169.8 (557) | 51 | 2022 | Residential | Topped out in 2020. |
| 28 | Wardian London; West Tower | | Canary Wharf / Isle of Dogs 51°30′05″N 0°01′22″W | 168.1 (552) | 50 | 2020 | Residential | Approved in November 2014. |
| 29 | One Blackfriars | | South Bank 51°30′28″N 0°06′18″W | 166.3 (546) | 50 | 2019 | Mixed-use | Nicknamed "The Boomerang". Tallest building in the South Bank. |
| 30 | Opus | | South Bank 51°30′29″N 0°06′14″W | 166 (545) | 50 | 2026 | Residential | Part of the Bankside Yards development. |
| 31 | 1 Leadenhall Street | | City of London 51°30′47″N 0°05′02″W | 165.2 (542) | 32 | 2025 | Office | |
| 32 | Broadgate Tower | | City of London 51°31′16″N 0°04′48″W | 161.3 (529) | 35 | 2008 | Office | |
| 33 | Principal Tower | | Shoreditch 51°31′20″N 0°04′44″W | 161.3 (529) | 50 | 2019 | Residential | Tallest building in Shoreditch. |
| 34 | 50–60 Charter Street Tower 1 | | Canary Wharf / Isle of Dogs 51°30′07″N 0°00′38″W | 161 (528) | 49 | 2024 | Residential | Part of the Wood Wharf development. Also known as (Wood Wharf J3. |
| 35 | 20 Fenchurch Street | | City of London 51°30′41″N 0°05′00″W | 160.1 (525) | 36 | 2014 | Office | Nicknamed "The Walkie-Talkie". |
| 36 | One Thames Quay | | Canary Wharf / Isle of Dogs 51°30′00″N 0°00′43″W | 157.6 (517) | 49 | 2024 | Residential | A scheme with an increased height of 180 m (591 ft) was rejected by Tower Hamlets Council but later approved by the Secretary of State. Topped out in November 2024 |
| 37 | 40 Leadenhall Street | | City of London 51°30′47″N 0°04′48″W | 156.7 (514) | 35 | 2024 | Office | Approved in 2015. |
| 38 | One Churchill Place | | Canary Wharf / Isle of Dogs 51°30′18″N 0°00′51″W | 156.3 (513) | 30 | 2004 | Office | |
| 39 | River Park Tower | | Vauxhall / Nine Elms 51°29′04″N 0°07′41″W | 155.6 (510) | 43 | 2023 | Residential | Part of the One Nine Elms development. |
| 40 | College Road Tower A | | Croydon 51°22′26″N 0°05′37″W | 154.4 (507) | 50 | 2023 | Residential | Tallest building in Croydon. Topped out in November 2022. Tallest modular building in Europe. Also known as Enclave: Croydon. |
| 41 | 25 Bank Street | | Canary Wharf / Isle of Dogs 51°30′11″N 0°01′15″W | 153 (502) | 30 | 2003 | Office | |
| 42 | 40 Bank Street | | Canary Wharf / Isle of Dogs 51°30′09″N 0°01′09″W | 153 (502) | 30 | 2003 | Office | |
| N/A | Croydon Transmitter | | Croydon 51°24′35″N 0°05′09″W | 152 (499) | N/A | 1964 | Communication | |
| 43 | 10 Upper Bank Street | | Canary Wharf / Isle of Dogs 51°30′10″N 0°01′00″W | 150.9 (495) | 30 | 2003 | Office | |
| 44 | South Bank Tower | | South Bank 51°30′28″N 0°06′26″W | 150.4 (493) | 42 | 1978 | Residential | Previously known as King's Reach Tower and originally built to a height of 108 m (354 ft). A redevelopment completed in 2016 increased the height of the skyscraper to 150.4 m (493 ft). |
| 45 | Carrara Tower | | Islington 51°31′45″N 0°05′47″W | 149.6 (491) | 43 | 2020 | Residential | Also known as 250 City Road Tower 1. Tallest building in Islington. |
| 46 | Baltimore Tower | | Canary Wharf / Isle of Dogs 51°29′52″N 0°00′56″W | 149.1 (489) | 45 | 2017 | Residential | Also known as Arena Tower. |
| 47 | 10 Park Drive | | Canary Wharf / Isle of Dogs 51°30′09″N 0°00′51″W | 148.9 (489) | 43 | 2019 | Residential | Part of the Wood Wharf development; also known as Wood Wharf A3. |
| 48 | Guy's Tower | | Southwark 51°30′13″N 0°05′14″W | 148.7 (488) | 34 | 1974 | Hospital | Second tallest all-hospital building in the world. Tallest structure in London completed in the 1970s. Underwent a renovation in 2015 that increased its height from 143 m (469 ft) to 148.7 m (488 ft). |
| 49 | Highpoint | | Elephant & Castle 51°29′33″N 0°06′09″W | 148.7 (488) | 46 | 2018 | Residential | Tallest building in Elephant and Castle. Also known as Castilla or 360 London. |
| 50 | Pan Peninsula; East Tower | | Canary Wharf / Isle of Dogs 51°29′59″N 0°01′03″W | 148 (486) | 48 | 2008 | Residential | |
| 51 | Strata SE1 | | Elephant & Castle 51°29′35″N 0°05′58″W | 147.9 (485) | 43 | 2010 | Residential | Tallest residential building in London at the time of its completion. Contains three wind turbines near its roof. Tallest building in Elephant and Castle from 2010 to 2018. |
| 52 | Maine Tower | | Canary Wharf / Isle of Dogs 51°29′57″N 0°01′12″W | 143.7 (471) | 42 | 2019 | Residential | Also known as Harbour Central Block D. |
| 53 | Manhattan Loft Gardens | | Stratford 51°32′43″N 0°00′28″W | 142 (466) | 42 | 2018 | Residential | Also known as The Stratford. |
| 54 | One Bank Street | | Canary Wharf / Isle of Dogs 51°30′13″N 0°01′27″W | 142.9 (469) | 28 | 2019 | Office | Formerly known as Heron Quays West. Application submitted in December 2013. |
| 55 | Imperial West; Residential Building | | White City 51°30′56″N 0°13′33″W | 138.5 (454) | 35 | 2019 | Residential | Tallest building in White City. |
| 56 | 2 Trafalgar Way; Tower 1 | | Poplar 51°30′25″N 0°00′35″W | 138 (453) | 48 | 2026 | Residential | Part of a new student accommodation development near Blackwall. |
| 57 | 24 Marsh Wall; East Tower | | Canary Wharf / Isle of Dogs 51°30′07″N 0°01′29″W | 136.5 (448) | 44 | 2010 | Residential | Also known as Landmark East Tower. |
| 58 | Charrington Tower | | Blackwall 51°30′25″N 0°00′20″W | 136 (446) | 44 | 2016 | Residential | Tallest building in Blackwall. |
| 59 | One Bishopsgate Plaza | | City of London 51°31′00″N 0°04′49″W | 135.9 (446) | 42 | 2021 | Hotel | |
| N/A | London Eye | | South Bank 51°30′12″N 0°07′11″W | 135 (443) | N/A | 1999 | Observation | The world's tallest Ferris wheel from 1999 to 2006. |
| 60 | Atlas | | Hackney 51°31′39″N 0°05′18″W | 134.5 (441) | 40 | 2019 | Residential | Also known as 145 City Road. Replaced Crown House. |
| 61 | Saffron Square | | Croydon 51°22′44″N 0°05′58″W | 134 (440) | 44 | 2016 | Residential | Also known as Pinnacle Apartments. Tallest building in Croydon from 2016 to 2023. |
| 62 | 101 George Street | | Croydon 51°22′27″N 0°05′38″W | 133.9 (439) | 44 | 2021 | Residential | Was the world's tallest modular building upon completion. Also known as Ten Degrees Croydon. |
| 63 | Chapter London Bridge | | Southwark 51°30′11″N 0°05′07″W | 133.5 (438) | 40 | 2025 | Residential | Student accommodation tower near London Bridge station. Approved in May 2019, with construction commencing in March 2022. |
| 64 | 150 High Street, Stratford | | Stratford 51°32′06″N 0°00′24″W | 133.1 (437) | 43 | 2013 | Residential | Also known as Stratford Halo. |
| N/A | Wembley Stadium | | Wembley 51°33′25″N 0°16′47″W | 133 (436) | 6 | 2007 | Stadium | Second-tallest stadium in the world. |
| 65 | Valencia Tower | | Islington 51°31′44″N 0°05′43″W | 129.9 (426) | 37 | 2023 | Residential | Part of the 250 City Road complex. |
| 67 | Cherry Park Building A1 | | Stratford 51°32′31″N 0°00′27″W | 128.5 (422) | 37 | 2024 | Residential | Part of the Cherry Park development. |
| 68 | Keybridge Lofts | | Vauxhall / Nine Elms 51°28′58″N 0°07′30″W | 128.4 (421) | 36 | 2020 | Residential | Was the UK's tallest brick residential tower upon completion. Replaced a former BT building called Keybridge House. Topped out in 2020. |
| 69 | 10 George Street | | Canary Wharf / Isle of Dogs 51°30′08″N 0°00′47″W | 128.1 (420) | 36 | 2019 | Residential | Part of the Wood Wharf development. Also known as Vertus or Wood Wharf E2. Application in December 2013, approved in 2014. Topped out in 2019. |
| 70 | One West Point Tower 2 | | North Acton 51°31′20″N 0°15′45″W | 128 (420) | 36 | 2022 | Residential | Tallest building in North Acton. Part of the Portal West development. Also known as Legacy House or Legacy Point. |
| 71 | CityPoint | | City of London 51°31′10″N 0°05′23″W | 127.1 (417) | 36 | 1967 | Office | Previously known as Britannic House when it was completed in 1967 at a height of 122 m (400 ft). It was refurbished in 2000 and renamed CityPoint, where its increased its height to 127 m (417 ft). |
| 72 | Gladwin Tower | | Vauxhall / Nine Elms 51°28′54″N 0°07′41″W | 126 (413) | 34 | 2019 | Residential | Also known as Nine Elms Point, Albert Point. Completed in 2020. |
| 73 | The Stage | | Shoreditch 51°31′23″N 0°04′46″W | 126 (413) | 38 | 2022 | Residential | Topped out in 2021. |
| 74 | Two Fifty One | | Elephant & Castle 51°29′50″N 0°05′59″W | 125.2 (411) | 39 | 2018 | Residential | Formerly known as Eileen House. |
| 75 | Willis Building | | City of London 51°30′46″N 0°04′53″W | 124.8 (409) | 28 | 2007 | Office | |
| 76 | Sirocco Tower | | Canary Wharf / Isle of Dogs 51°29′57″N 0°01′09″W | 124.8 (409) | 36 | 2019 | Residential | Also known as Harbour Central Block C. |
| 77 | No.9 Thames City | | Vauxhall / Nine Elms 51°28′58″N 0°07′41″W | 124.8 (409) | 36 | 2022 | Residential | Planning application in 2014. Topped out in 2020. |
| 78 | One Crown Place South | | Shoreditch 51°31′13″N 0°05′03″W | 124.8 (409) | 34 | 2025 | Residential | Part of the One Crown Place development. Topped out in 2020. |
| 79 | Euston Tower | | Euston 51°31′31″N 0°08′21″W | 124.6 (409) | 36 | 1970 | Office | Tallest building in Euston. |
| 80 | The Founding | | Canada Water 51°29′49″N 0°03′00″W | 123.9 (406) | 35 | 2025 | Residential | Tallest building in Canada Water. |
| 81 | One The Elephant | | Elephant & Castle 51°29′37″N 0°06′06″W | 123.3 (405) | 37 | 2016 | Residential | Formerly known as St. Mary's Residential. |
| 82 | Cromwell Tower | | City of London 51°31′14″N 0°05′34″W | 123 (404) | 42 | 1973 | Residential | Part of the Barbican Estate. |
| 83 | Lauderdale Tower | | City of London 51°31′11″N 0°05′49″W | 123 (404) | 42 | 1974 | Residential | Part of the Barbican Estate. |
| 84 | Shakespeare Tower | | City of London 51°31′13″N 0°05′42″W | 123 (404) | 43 | 1976 | Residential | Part of the Barbican Estate. |
| 85 | Chelsea Waterfront West Tower | | Chelsea Harbour 51°28′39″N 0°10′48″W | 122.5 (402) | 37 | 2019 | Residential | Tallest building in Chelsea Harbour |
| 86 | 1 Casson Square | | South Bank 51°30′15″N 0°06′55″W | 122.3 (401) | 37 | 2019 | Residential | Part of Southbank Place. Topped out in 2018. |
| 87 | Pan Peninsula; West Tower | | Canary Wharf / Isle of Dogs 51°30′00″N 0°01′06″W | 122 (400) | 39 | 2008 | Residential | |
| 88 | Alta at Consort Place | | Canary Wharf / Isle of Dogs 51°30′03″N 0°01′25″W | 121.9 (400) | 36 | 2024 | Residential | |
| 89 | Sky Gardens Nine Elms | | Vauxhall / Nine Elms 51°28′55″N 0°07′38″W | 120 (394) | 36 | 2017 | Residential | Also known as Vauxhall Sky Gardens. |
| 90 | 40 Marsh Wall | | Canary Wharf / Isle of Dogs 51°30′04″N 0°01′24″W | 119.3 (391) | 40 | 2017 | Hotel | Tallest all-hotel building in the United Kingdom. Also known as Novotel Canary Wharf. |
| 91 | Millbank Tower | | Westminster 51°29′32″N 0°07′33″W | 118.9 (390) | 33 | 1962 | Office | Tallest building in London from 1962 to 1965. Tallest building in Westminster. |
| 92 | 25 Churchill Place | | Canary Wharf / Isle of Dogs 51°30′13″N 0°00′54″W | 118 (387) | 23 | 2014 | Office | Whilst the building's height above ground level is 118 m (387 ft), it's overall height above the promenade level is about 124 m (407 ft). |
| 93 | St Helen's | | City of London 51°30′52″N 0°04′54″W | 117.9 (387) | 28 | 1969 | Office | Formerly known as the Aviva Tower. |
| 94 | Centre Point | | West End 51°30′58″N 0°07′47″W | 117.3 (385) | 35 | 1966 | Residential | Originally an office building, it was converted into residential use in 2015. |
| 95 | Conington Road | | Lewisham 51°27′57″N 0°00′48″W | 117.1 (384) | 34 | 2024 | Residential | Tallest building in Lewisham. |
| 96 | Empress State Building | | Fulham 51°29′15″N 0°11′59″W | 117 (384) | 31 | 1961 | Office | Tallest building in Fulham. Originally stood at a height of 100 m (330 ft) before a height extension in 2003. |
| 97 | Stratosphere Tower | | Stratford 51°32′25″N 0°00′02″W | 117 (384) | 38 | 2017 | Residential | Formerly known as Broadway Chambers. |
| 98 | The Eades | | Walthamstow 51°34′59″N 0°01′22″W | 117 (384) | 34 | 2025 | Residential | Tallest building in Walthamstow. Redevelopment of The Mall. |
| 99 | Chronicle Tower | | Islington 51°31′48″N 0°05′49″W | 115 (377) | 35 | 2016 | Residential | Tallest building in Islington from 2016 to 2020. Also known as Lexicon Tower. |
| 100 | Rudolf Place | | Vauxhall / Nine Elms 51°28′59″N 0°07′28″W | 114.9 (377) | 37 | 2021 | Residential | Used for student accommodation. Also known as Vega. |
| N/A | ArcelorMittal Orbit | | Stratford 51°32′18″N 0°00′48″W | 114.5 (376) | 2 | 2012 | Observation | A sculpture built in conjunction with the 2012 Summer Olympics. |
| 101 | Hawthorne House | | Stratford 51°32′23″N 0°00′04″W | 114.5 (376) | 36 | 2026 | Residential | |
| 102 | Fold Building | – | Croydon 51°22′16″N 0°05′51″W | 114 (374) | 36 | 2022 | Residential | Also known as Queen's Quarter Building 1. Topped out in 2021. |
| 103 | TwelveTrees Park Building N01A | | West Ham 51°31′38″N 0°00′12″E | 113.5 (372) | 35 | 2025 | Residential | |
| 103 | Insignia Point | | Stratford 51°32′51″N 0°00′31″W | 113 (371) | 31 | 2018 | Residential | Also known as East Village E20 or Site N08 Tower 2. |
| 104 | 20 Ropemaker Street | | City of London 51°31′11″N 0°05′18″W | 112.5 (369) | 27 | 2023 | Office | Topped out in 2022. |
| 105 | The Heron | | City of London 51°31′11″N 0°05′25″W | 112 (367) | 36 | 2013 | Residential | Also known as Milton Court. |
| 106 | Manor Road Quarter | | Canning Town 51°30′58″N 0°00′26″E | 112 (367) | 33 | 2024 | Residential | Tallest building in Canning Town. Topped out in September 2023. |
| 107 | 50-60 Charter Street Tower 2 | | Canary Wharf / Isle of Dogs 51°30′07″N 0°00′41″W | 112 (367) | 34 | 2024 | Residential | Part of the Wood Wharf development. Also known as Wood Wharf J1. Updated application approved in February 2022. |
| 109 | Cassini Tower | | White City 51°30′42″N 0°13′17″W | 111.9 (367) | 35 | 2023 | Residential | Also known as White City Living-Building E1. |
| 110 | Sky View Tower | | Stratford 51°31′50″N 0°00′47″W | 111.5 (366) | 35 | 2017 | Residential | Tallest of the Capital Towers development. |
| N/A | St Paul's Cathedral | | City of London 51°30′50″N 0°05′54″W | 111 (364) | N/A | 1710 | Religious | Tallest place of worship in London. Tallest structure completed in London in the 1700s. |
| 111 | 2 Trafalgar Way; Tower 2 | | Poplar 51°30′26″N 0°00′33″W | 110 (361) | 36 | 2026 | Residential | Part of a new student accommodation development near Blackwall. |
| 112 | Dollar Bay | | Canary Wharf / Isle of Dogs 51°30′02″N 0°00′36″W | 109 (358) | 31 | 2017 | Residential | |
| 113 | 1 West India Quay | | Canary Wharf / Isle of Dogs 51°30′26″N 0°01′16″W | 108 (354) | 36 | 2004 | Office | |
| 114 | Enclave: Acton | | North Acton 51°31′18″N 0°15′35″W | 107.8 (354) | 32 | 2025 | Residential | Also known as The Castle. |
| 115 | Hale Works | | Tottenham Hale 51°35′18″N 0°03′32″W | 107.4 (352) | 33 | 2021 | Residential | Tallest building in Tottenham Hale. |
| 116 | TwelveTrees Park Block S01A | | West Ham 51°31′36″N 0°00′14″E | 107.2 (352) | 33 | 2025 | Residential | Part of the Twelvetrees Park development. |
| 117 | Shell Centre | | South Bank 51°30′14″N 0°07′01″W | 107 (351) | 26 | 1961 | Office | Tallest building in London from 1961 to 1962. |
| 118 | 99 Bishopsgate | | City of London 51°30′57″N 0°04′57″W | 106 (348) | 27 | 1976 | Office | A truck bomb exploded by the Provisional IRA damaged the building in 1993. The building was hence refurbished in 1994, increasing its height slightly from 104 (341 ft) to 106 m (348 ft). Plans for a new 54-storey tower on the site were approved in 2025. |
| 119 | One Crown Place North | | Shoreditch 51°31′14″N 0°05′03″W | 105.9 (347) | 30 | 2021 | Residential | |
| 120 | Ontario Tower | | Blackwall 51°30′25″N 0°00′17″W | 105.5 (346) | 32 | 2007 | Residential | |
| 121 | Finsbury Tower | | Finsbury 51°31′22″N 0°05′25″W | 105.5 (346) | 29 | 2021 | Office | Tallest building in Finsbury. Also known as HYLO. |
| 122 | 30 Casson Square | | South Bank 51°30′16″N 0°06′57″W | 105.4 (346) | 30 | 2019 | Residential | |
| 123 | 33 Canada Square | | Canary Wharf / Isle of Dogs 51°30′15″N 0°01′08″W | 105 (344) | 18 | 1999 | Office | |
| 123 | Pioneer Point North | | Ilford 51°33′26″N 0°04′14″E | 104.7 (344) | 31 | 2011 | Residential | Tallest building in Ilford. |
| 124 | Chapter Spitalfields | | City of London 51°31′03″N 0°04′36″W | 104 (341) | 34 | 2010 | Residential | Used for student accommodation. |
| N/A | Battersea Power Station | | Battersea 51°28′54″N 0°08′41″W | 103.8 (341) | 14 | 1955 | Industrial | |
| 125 | Stock Exchange Tower | | City of London 51°30′53″N 0°05′10″W | 103.3 (339) | 27 | 1970 | Office | Also known by its address, 125 Old Broad Street. |
| 126 | Legacy Tower | | Stratford 51°32′34″N 0°00′05″W | 103 (338) | 33 | 2018 | Residential | Also known as Stratford Central. |
| 127 | Lewisham Exchange Tower | | Lewisham 51°27′53″N 0°00′50″W | 102.9 (338) | 35 | 2021 | Residential | Used for student accommodation. |
| 128 | Hightail Point | | Stratford 51°32′45″N 0°00′41″W | 102.8 (337) | 31 | 2022 | Residential | |
| 129 | Cherry Park Building A3 | | Stratford 51°32′30″N 0°00′26″W | 102.7 (337) | 30 | 2024 | Residential | |
| 130 | No.5 Upper Riverside | | Greenwich Peninsula 51°30′02″N 0°00′30″E | 102 (335) | 31 | 2019 | Residential | Tallest building on the Greenwich Peninsula. |
| N/A | Victoria Tower | | Westminster 51°29′54″N 0°07′31″W | 102 (335) | N/A | 1858 | Government | Tallest non-religious building in the world upon completion. Tallest structure completed in London in the 1800s. |
| 131 | Westmark Tower | | Paddington 51°31′15″N 0°10′20″W | 101.7 (334) | 30 | 2021 | Residential | Part of the West End Gate mixed-use development. Tallest building in Paddington. |
| 132 | Hurlock Heights | | Elephant & Castle 51°29′33″N 0°05′52″W | 101.5 (333) | 31 | 2018 | Residential | Also known as West Grove-The Highwood. Tallest building in the Elephant Park Development. |
| 133 | London Hilton on Park Lane | | West End 51°30′20″N 0°09′00″W | 101 (331) | 29 | 1963 | Hotel | |
| 134 | Portland House | | Westminster 51°29′51″N 0°08′29″W | 101 (331) | 29 | 1963 | Office | Currently undergoing refurbishment, which is expected to be completed in 2025. |
| 135 | Skyline | | Hackney 51°34′18″N 0°05′22″W | 101 (331) | 31 | 2017 | Residential | Also known as Woodberry Down-Skylie. Tallest building in Woodberry Down. |
| 136 | Goodluck Hope - Douglass Tower | | Leamouth 51°30′33″N 0°00′22″E | 100.7 (330) | 30 | 2022 | Residential | Tallest building in Leamouth. Also known as Leamouth Peninsula South-Building B. |
| 137 | One Angel Court | | City of London 51°30′55″N 0°05′14″W | 100.7 (330) | 26 | 1979 | Office | Originally known as Angel Court Tower. The building underwent a refurbishment in 2017. |
| 138 | 4 Casson Square | | South Bank 51°30′14″N 0°06′56″W | 100 (328) | 29 | 2019 | Residential | Topped out in 2018. Part of Southbank Place. |

== Tallest under construction or proposed ==
=== Under construction ===
This table lists buildings that are under construction in London and are planned to rise at least 328 feet (100 m) as of 2026. Under construction buildings that have already been topped out are listed above. The "year" column indicates the estimated year of completion. Buildings on hold are not included.

| Rank | Name | Image | Location | Height m (ft) | Floors | Year | Purpose | Notes |
|---|---|---|---|---|---|---|---|---|
| 1 | 25 Cuba | – | Canary Wharf / Isle of Dogs 51°30′05″N 0°01′27″W | 172 (564) | 52 | 2028 | Residential | Updated application approved after initial concerns by the London Fire Brigade suggesting the single staircase serving the upper floors being inadequate during emergency situations. A second staircase was incorporated into the design and approved in March 2022. |
| 2 | 30 Marsh Wall | – | Canary Wharf / Isle of Dogs 51°30′06″N 0°01′27″W | 156 (512) | 48 | 2028 | Residential | New student residential tower. Approved 31 March 2022. |
| 3 | 2 Finsbury Avenue; East Tower | | City of London 51°31′11″N 0°05′02″W | 156 (512) | 38 | 2027 | Office | Proposed in 2015, slight design changes, resubmitted application in 2016 and approved in December 2021. |
| 4 | 50 Fenchurch Street | – | City of London 51°30′42″N 0°04′52″W | 149.6 (491) | 36 | 2028 | Office | Approved 14 May 2020. |
| 5 | The Ayrton | – | Paddington 51°31′14″N 0°10′17″W | 138 (453) | 39 | 2029 | Residential | West End Gate scheme on the site of the former Paddington Green Police Station. Approved in March 2023. |
| 6 | Ferry Island Building 1 North Tower | | Tottenham Hale 51°35′19″N 0°03′42″W | 128.9 (423) | 38 | 2026 | Residential | Part of the Heart of Hale development. |
| 7 | One North Quay | | Canary Wharf / Isle of Dogs 51°30′26″N 0°01′10″W | 123.8 (406) | 24 | 2027 | Laboratory | |
| 8 | Elephant and Castle Town Centre; Tower 1 | | Elephant & Castle 51°29′39″N 0°06′00″W | 121.1 (397) | 32 | 2026 | Residential | Tallest tower of Elephant and Castle Town Centre redevelopment. Application approved in June 2021. |
| 9 | Sampson House B | – | South Bank 51°30′27″N 0°06′10″W | 120 (394) | 34 | 2026 | Residential | Part of the Bankside Yards development. |
| 10 | The Portal | | North Acton 51°31′20″N 0°15′33″W | 119.3 (391) | 36 | – | Residential | |
| 11 | Elephant and Castle Town Centre; Tower 3 | | Elephant & Castle 51°29′39″N 0°06′00″W | 117 (384) | 35 | 2026 | Residential | Elephant and Castle Town Centre redevelopment. Application Approved in June 2021. |
| 12 | The Artisan Tower | – | Wandsworth 51°27′31″N 0°11′39″W | 113 (371) | 36 | – | Residential | Part of the Ram Quarter masterplan development. |
| 13 | 100 Kensington | – | Kensington 51°29′32″N 0°12′07″W | 109 (358) | 29 | – | Residential | Also known as 100 West Cromwell Road. Will be the tallest building in Kensington upon completion. |
| 14 | Edge London Bridge | | Southwark 51°30′10″N 0°05′04″W | 107.2 (352) | 27 | 2026 | Residential | |
| 16 | 72 Upper Ground | – | South Bank 51°30′26″N 0°06′40″W | 105.2 (345) | 22 | 2029 | Office | Redevelopment of the London Television Centre. |
| 17 | The Bellamy | | Canary Wharf / Isle of Dogs 51°30′03″N 0°01′27″W | 104 (341) | 31 | 2026 | Residential | Proposal for a new residential tower in Canary Wharf. Approved in July 2022. |
| 18 | The Dovetail Building | – | City of London 51°30′57″N 0°04′43″W | 103 (338) | 24 | 2029 | Office | Also known as 115–123 Houndsditch. Proposal for a new office development in the City of London. Approved in December 2021. |
| 19 | Bermondsey Project Building BF-S | – | Bermondsey 51°29′39″N 0°03′45″W | 102.7 (337) | 29 | 2027 | Residential | |
| 20 | Solaris | | White City 51°30′41″N 0°13′25″W | 102 (335) | 32 | 2026 | Residential | |
| 21 | 2 Finsbury Avenue West Tower | | City of London 51°31′12″N 0°05′05″W | 100.9 (331) | 24 | 2026 | Office | |

=== Approved ===
This table lists buildings that are approved for construction in London and are planned to be at least 100 m (328 ft) tall. A dash indicates information about building is unknown or not yet publicly available. The "year" column indicates the estimated year of completion. Figures denoted with an asterisk (*) are approximates.

| Name | Location | Height m (ft) | Floors | Year | Purpose | Notes |
|---|---|---|---|---|---|---|
| One London | City of London | 294 (965) | 74 | 2030 | Office | Planning application submitted in February 2016. Approved in November 2016. Updated proposal submitted January 2024, which was approved in December 2024. |
| 55 Bishopsgate | City of London | 268.6 (881) | 63 | 2029 | Office | Planning application approved in July 2023. |
| 100 Leadenhall | City of London | 249 (817) | 56 | 2026 | Office | Planning application approved in July 2018. |
| 99 Bishopsgate | City of London | 240 (787) | 54 | 2030 | Office | Planning application approved in January 2025. |
| Riverside South Tower 1 | Canary Wharf / Isle of Dogs | 237 (778) | 45 | – | Office | Built to ground level. On hold. |
| Spire London | Canary Wharf / Isle of Dogs | 235 (771) | 67 | – | Residential | Replaces two proposals on this site – Columbus Tower and Hertsmere Tower. Application 8 October 2015, Approved in 2016 Currently on hold. |
| Vauxhall Square Tower 1 | Vauxhall / Nine Elms | 230.5 (756) | 69 | – | Residential | Approved 8 September 2026. |
| Ensign House | Canary Wharf / Isle of Dogs | 224 (735)* | 56 | 2026 | Residential | Approved 17 February 2022. |
| 4 Portal Way Tower 1 | North Acton | 204 (669) | 58 | – | Residential | Previous application approved July 2016. New proposal approved October 2024. |
| One Portal Way Tower 1 | North Acton | 196 (643) | 56 | – | Residential | Proposal for a mixed use development in North Acton. Approved in October 2023. |
| 18 Blackfriars Road "Office Building" | South Bank | 191 (627) | 48 | – | Office | This is the third proposal for this development site. Previous proposals included from 2008, and 2016. Approved in May 2024. |
| 77 Marsh Wall | Canary Wharf / Isle of Dogs | 190 (623) | 54 | – | Residential | Approved 23 July 2026. |
| One Portal Way Tower 2 | North Acton | 186 (610) | 51 | – | Residential | Proposal for a mixed use development in North Acton. Approved in October 2023. |
| Riverside South Tower 2 | Canary Wharf / Isle of Dogs | 186 (610) | 37 | – | Office | Built to ground level. On hold. |
| Vauxhall Cross Tower 1 | Vauxhall / Nine Elms | 185 (607) | 53 | – | Residential | Approved in April 2020. |
| One Portal Way Tower 3 | North Acton | 182 (597) | 51 | – | Residential | Proposal for a mixed use development in North Acton. Approved in October 2023. |
| 63 St Mary Axe | City of London | 176 (577) | 46 | – | Office | Approved in 2025. |
| One East Point | Canary Wharf / Isle of Dogs | 170 (558) | 52 | – | Residential | Approved in October 2024. |
| One Lansdowne Road Tower 1 | Croydon | 164 (538) | 50 | – | Residential | Approved in December 2024. |
| 4 Portal Way Tower 2 | North Acton | 161 (528) | 44 | – | Residential | Previous application approved July 2016. New proposal approved October 2024. |
| Ten Bank Street | Canary Wharf / Isle of Dogs | 161 (528) | 31 | – | Office | Heron Quays West 1 10 Bank Street. Site preparation. |
| Wood Wharf B1 | Canary Wharf / Isle of Dogs | 160 (525) | – | – | Residential | Application 19 December 2013. Approved in 2014. |
| Borough Triangle Tower 1 | Elephant & Castle | 158 (518) | 46 | 2034 | Residential | Part of the new Borough Triangle development. Approved March 2025. |
| 13–14 Appold Street | Shoreditch | 156 (512) | 45 | 2019 | Hotel | Approved in 2015. |
| One Station Road | Ilford | 154 (505) | 42 | – | Residential | Approved in 2019 by Redbridge council. |
| 99 City Road | Islington | 152 (499) | 35 | – | Office | Approved in September 2023. |
| One Thames City N10 | Vauxhall / Nine Elms | 151 (495) | 46 | – | Residential | As per planning application of 2014. |
| 18 Blackfriars Road "Stamford Building" | Blackfriars | 151 (495) | 44 | – | Residential | Proposal for a 40-storey residential tower at Blackfriars. This is the third proposal for this development site. Previous proposals included from 2008, and 2016. Approved in May 2024. |
| Vauxhall Cross Tower 2 | Vauxhall / Nine Elms | 151 (495) | 42 | – | Residential | Approved in April 2020 |
| 7 Brannan Street (Wood Wharf F1) | Canary Wharf / Isle of Dogs | 150 (492) | 50 | 2028 | Residential | Outline application for a new student let tower in the new Wood Wharf development area. |
| 1Merchant Square | Paddington | 150 (492) | 42 | – | Residential | Planned to be the tallest building in the City of Westminster. On hold. |
| Borough Triangle Tower 2 | Elephant & Castle | 149 (489) | 42 | 2034 | Residential | Part of the new Borough Triangle development. Approved March 2025. |
| 56-58 Marsh Wall | Canary Wharf / Isle of Dogs | 147 (482) | 46 | – | Residential | Approved in April 2023. |
| 60 Gracechurch Street | City of London | 147 (482) | 36 | 2029 | Office | Approved in December 2024. |
| 130 Fenchurch Street | City of London | 146 (479) | 35 | 2030 | Office | Approved in October 2025. |
| Bermondsey Place Building B4 | Southwark | 143 (469) | 44 | – | Residential | Formerly known as Malt Street regeneration. The tower is the tallest of a new cluster of buildings, formed as part of the Old Kent Road regeneration scheme. |
| Doon Street Tower | South Bank | 140 (459) | 43 | – | Residential | On hold. |
| Stratford Island Tower 1 | Stratford | 140 (459) | 42 | – | Residential | Tallest building as part of redevelopment of Stratford Centre. Work was expected to begin 2017. |
| 54 Marsh Wall | Canary Wharf / Isle of Dogs | 140 (459) | 39 | – | Residential | Proposed 2014. New plans submitted and approved in January 2017. |
| Millharbour Village East G1.1 | Canary Wharf / Isle of Dogs | 139 (456) | 45 | – | Residential | |
| 70 Gracechurch Street | City of London | 138 (453) | 34 | – | Office | Proposal for a new office development. Approved in February 2021. |
| 85 Gracechurch Street | City of London | 131 (430) | 31 | 2030 | Office | Proposal for a new office development. Initially approved in March 2023. Revised due to the discovery of ancient roman ruins, proposal approved in July 2025. |
| 55 Gracechurch Street | City of London | 130 (427) | 30 | – | Office | Proposal for a new office development in the City of London. Approved in January 2021. |
| 12–20 Wyvil Road | Vauxhall | 126 (413) | 37 | 2020 | Residential | Old design Approved.N ew scheme named Grand South application submitted 2016 |
| Vicarage Field Tower 1 | Barking | 125 (410)* | 36 | – | Residential | Tallest tower of proposed Vicarage Field development in Barking. Approved 16 January 2017. |
| Botanical House | Croydon | 124 (407) | 36 | 2027 | Residential | Proposal for a new residential tower in Croydon. Approved in November 2023. |
| 1 Selsdon Way | Canary Wharf / Isle of Dogs | 123 (404) | 35 | – | Residential | Approved in January 2025. |
| Elizabeth House | South Bank | 123 (404) | 29 | – | Office | Located in Waterloo. |
| Millharbour Village East G1.3 | Canary Wharf / Isle of Dogs | 122 (400) | 39 | – | Residential | |
| IQL Park Place Tower 1 | Stratford | 120 (394) | 35 | 2026 | Residential | Tallest planned building in the Stratford Cross cluster in Stratford. |
| One Peninsula Square | Greenwich Peninsula | 120 (394)* | 36 | – | Residential | Proposal for a new 820-room student residential tower in Greenwich Peninsula. Approved in March 2024. |
| Northumberland Development Project Plot 3 | Tottenham | 117 (384) | 31 | – | Hotel | |
| Convoys Wharf Tower 1 | Deptford | 116 (381) | 40 | – | Residential | |
| South Quay Plaza 2 | Canary Wharf / Isle of Dogs | 115 (377) | 35 | – | Residential | Phase one under way. |
| One Fairchild Street | Shoreditch | 111 (364) | 28 | – | Office | New office proposal approved October 2024. |
| Republic at East India Dock | Blackwall | 110 (361) | 36 | – | Residential | Proposal for a mixed use development including a new student residential tower. Proposal approved by appeal after initially being rejected. |
| Lea Bridge Station Tower 1 | Lea Bridge | 109 (358) | 29 | – | Residential | Approved in 2025. |
| Hertford Road Tower 1 | Barking | 107 (351) | 32 | – | Residential | Approved in 2025. |
| London House (14-34 London Road) | Barking | 107 (351) | 30 | – | Residential | Proposal for a new residential development in Barking. Approved September 2025. |
| Westferry Printworks Tower 1 | Canary Wharf / Isle of Dogs | 106 (348) | 29 | – | Residential | Approved in April 2016 after public inquiry. Demolition of current buildings ongoing. |
| One Lansdowne Road Tower 2 | Croydon | 105 (344) | 31 | – | Residential | Approved in December 2024. |
| Hertford Road Tower 2 | Barking | 103 (338) | 31 | – | Residential | Approved in 2025. |
| Enderby Place Tower 1 | Greenwich | 102 (335) | 29 | – | Residential | |
| Leon Quarter | Croydon | 101.5 (333) | 29 | – | Residential | |

== Tallest unbuilt ==
This lists proposals for the construction of buildings in London that were planned to rise at least 150 metres (492 ft), for which planning permission was rejected or which were otherwise withdrawn. Figures denoted with an asterisk (*) are approximates.

| Name | Height m (ft) | Floors | Notes |
|---|---|---|---|
| London Millennium Tower | 386 (1,266) | 92 | |
| London Bridge Tower (Old Design) | 366 (1,201) | 87 | |
| The Spark Plug (Battersea Eco-tower) | 300 (984) | 40 | |
| The Tulip | 290 (951) | 12 | Observation tower in the City of London. Approved 2 April 2019; then refused planning permission by Sadiq Khan on 15 July 2019. |
| The Pinnacle | 288 (945) | 64 | Replaced by 22 Bishopsgate. |
| Minerva Building | 246 (807) | 53 | |
| Columbus Tower (London) | 237 (778) | 65 | Proposal replaced by Hertsmere House. |
| Elephant & Castle Tower 1 | 228 (748) | 55 | |
| One Lansdowne Road Tower 1 | 227 (745) | 69 | Approved in 2012. Received funding in November 2015. New plans submitted 2016, Application withdrawn November 2022. Site was sold to a new developer in January 2023, and a new mixed-use development proposed in July 2023. |
| 6–8 and 22–24 Bishopsgate Redevelopment (Original Design) | 216 (709) | 50 | |
| New London Bridge House Redevelopment | 211 (692) | 50 | |
| Citypoint (Santiago Calatrava) | 203 (666) | 27 | |
| Ropemaker Place Tower | 200 (656) | 38 | |
| Elephant & Castle Tower 2 | 182 (597) | 35 | |
| King's Cross Towers 1 and 2 | 180 (591) | 44 | |
| Stratford Waterfront Tower 1 | 160 (525)* | 47 | Two towers originally proposed at 47 stories. New plans will reduce height of towers. Part of the Olympic Park development. Replaced by shorter Ballymore scheme. |
| Stratford Waterfront Tower 2 | 160 (525)* | 47 | Two towers originally proposed at 47 stories. New plans will reduce height of towers. Part of the Olympic Park development. Replaced by shorter Ballymore scheme. |
| Ruskin Square Building | 159 (522) | 26 | Aka Croydon Gateway. |
| The Blade Paddington | 150 (492) | 44 | |

== Tallest destroyed or demolished ==
This lists all demolished buildings and structures in London that stood at least 328 feet (100 m) tall.

| Name | Image | Location | Height m (ft) | Floors | Year completed | Year demolished | Purpose | Notes |
|---|---|---|---|---|---|---|---|---|
| Old St Paul's Cathedral | | City of London | 149 (489) | N/A | 1240 | 1666 | Religious | Destroyed in the Great Fire of London. The current St Paul's Cathedral stands in its place. |
| Drapers' Gardens | | City of London | 100 (328) | 30 | 1967 | 2007 | Office | Designed by Swiss-British Architect Richard Seifert. Replaced by a shorter 74 metres (243 ft) tall office building. |
| Southwark Towers | | Southwark | 99.7 (327) | 25 | 1976 | 2009 | Office | Height is 100 m when rounded up to the nearest metre. Replaced by The Shard. |

== Timeline of tallest buildings and structures ==
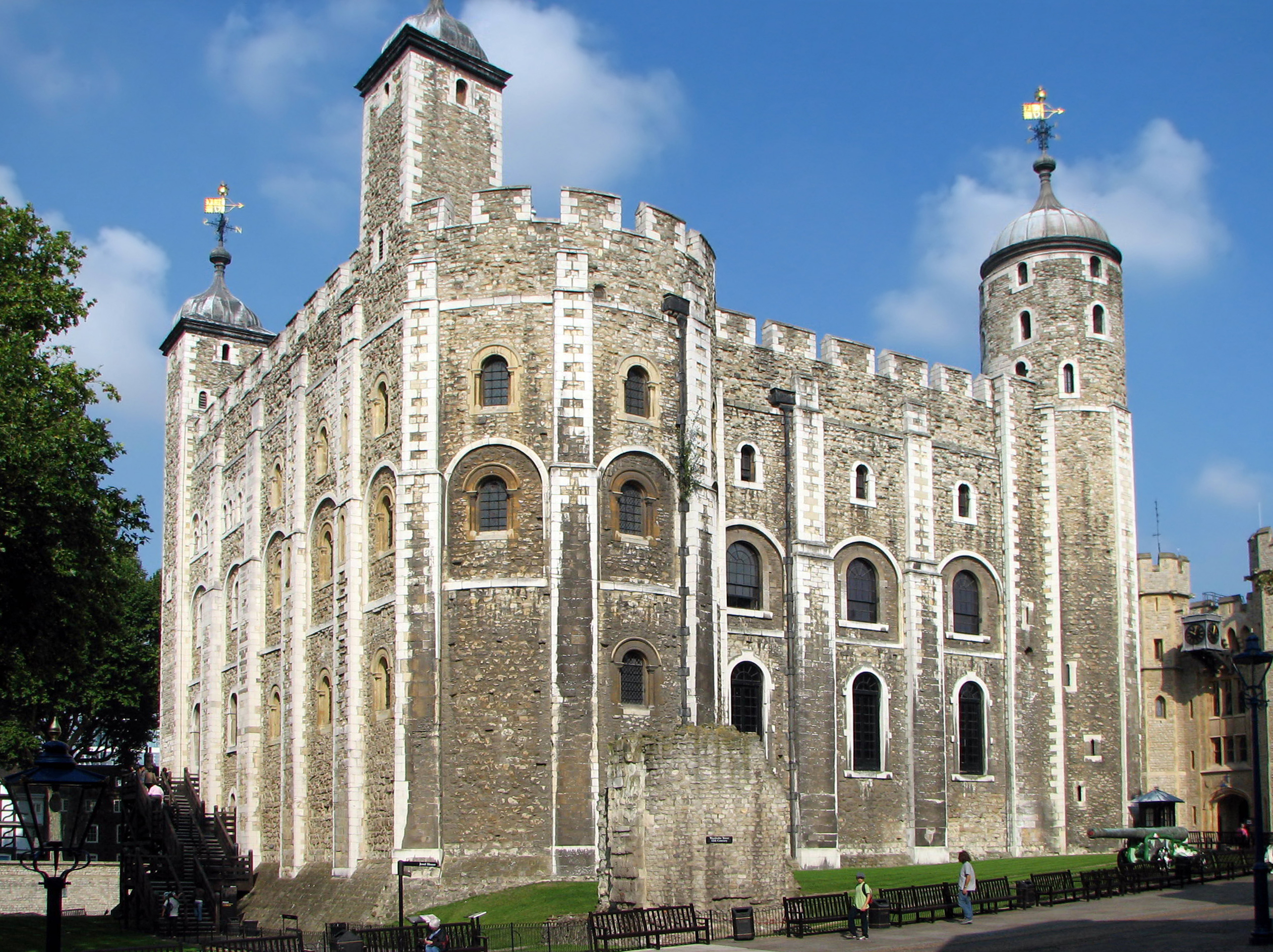
The White Tower stood as the tallest structure in London from 1098 until 1310.

This lists free-standing structures that have at some point held the title of tallest structure in London.

| Name | Image | Location | Years as tallest | Height m (ft) | Floors | Reference |
|---|---|---|---|---|---|---|
| White Tower | | Tower Hill | 1098–1310 (212 years) | 27 (89) | N/A | |
| Old St Paul's Cathedral^{[A]} | | City of London | 1310–1666 (356 years) | 149 (489)^{[B]} | N/A | |
| Southwark Cathedral | | Southwark | 1666–1677 (11 years) | 50 (164) | N/A | |
| Monument to the Great Fire of London | | City of London | 1677–1683 (6 years) | 62 (203) | N/A | |
| St Mary-le-Bow | | City of London | 1683–1710 (27 years) | 72 (236) | N/A | |
| St Paul's Cathedral | | City of London | 1710–1950 (240 years) | 111 (364) | N/A | |
| Crystal Palace transmitting station^{[D]} | | Crystal Palace Park | 1950–1991 (41 years) | 219 (719) | N/A | |
| One Canada Square | | Canary Wharf | 1991–2012 (21 years) | 236 (774) | 50 | |
| The Shard | | Southwark | 2012–present (14 years) | 306 (1,004) | 87 | |

== Skylines ==
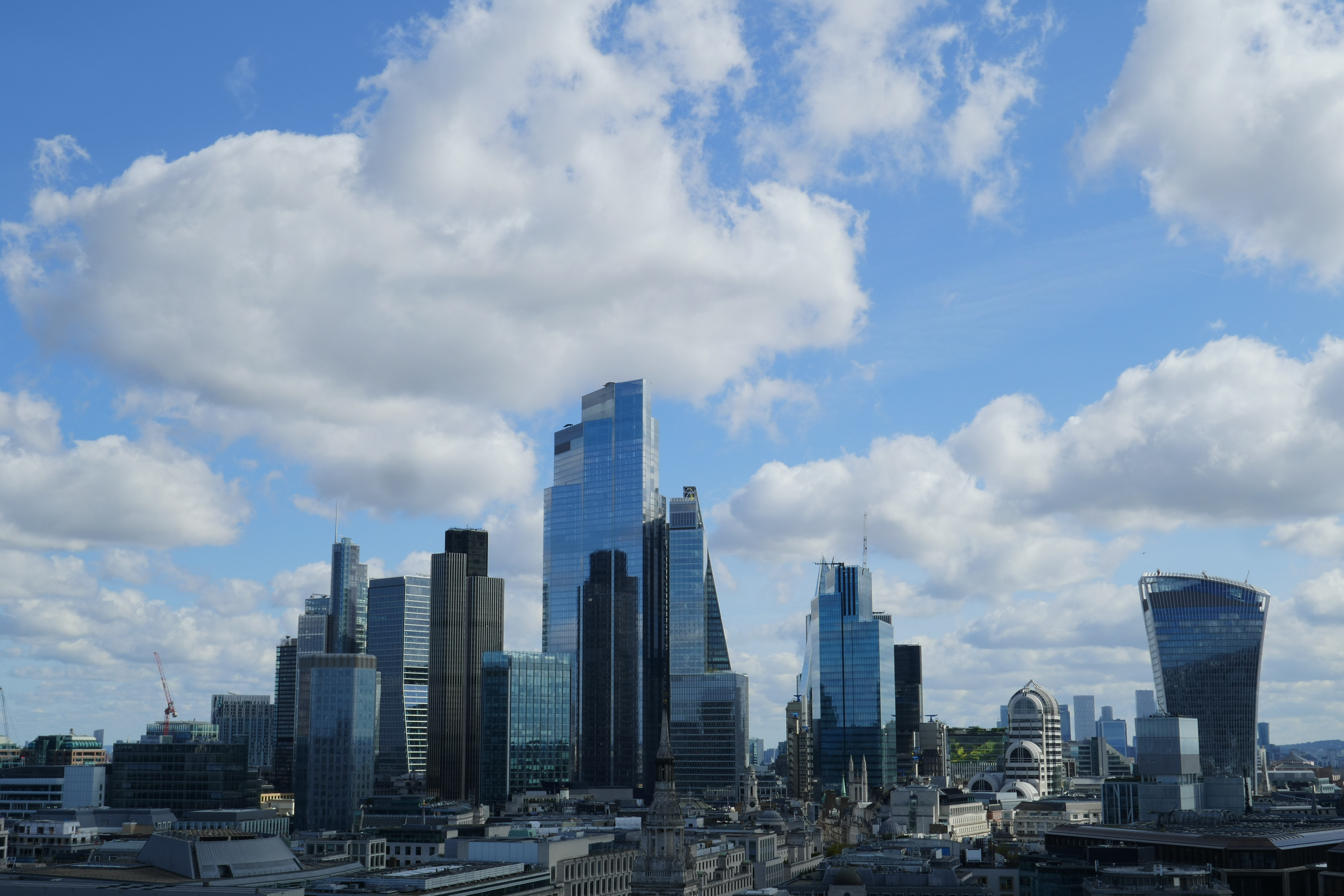
The City of London skyline as viewed from St Paul's Cathedral, October 2024. The tallest building shown here is 22 Bishopsgate at 278 m, which topped out in 2019. Since its construction The Gherkin is no longer visible from this angle. There are currently four towers in this cluster that are above 200 m tall with four more approved to be constructed, 1 Undershaft at 290 m tall, 55 Bishopsgate at 269 m tall, 100 Leadenhall at 249 m tall, and 99 Bishopsgate at 240 m tall, by 2030.

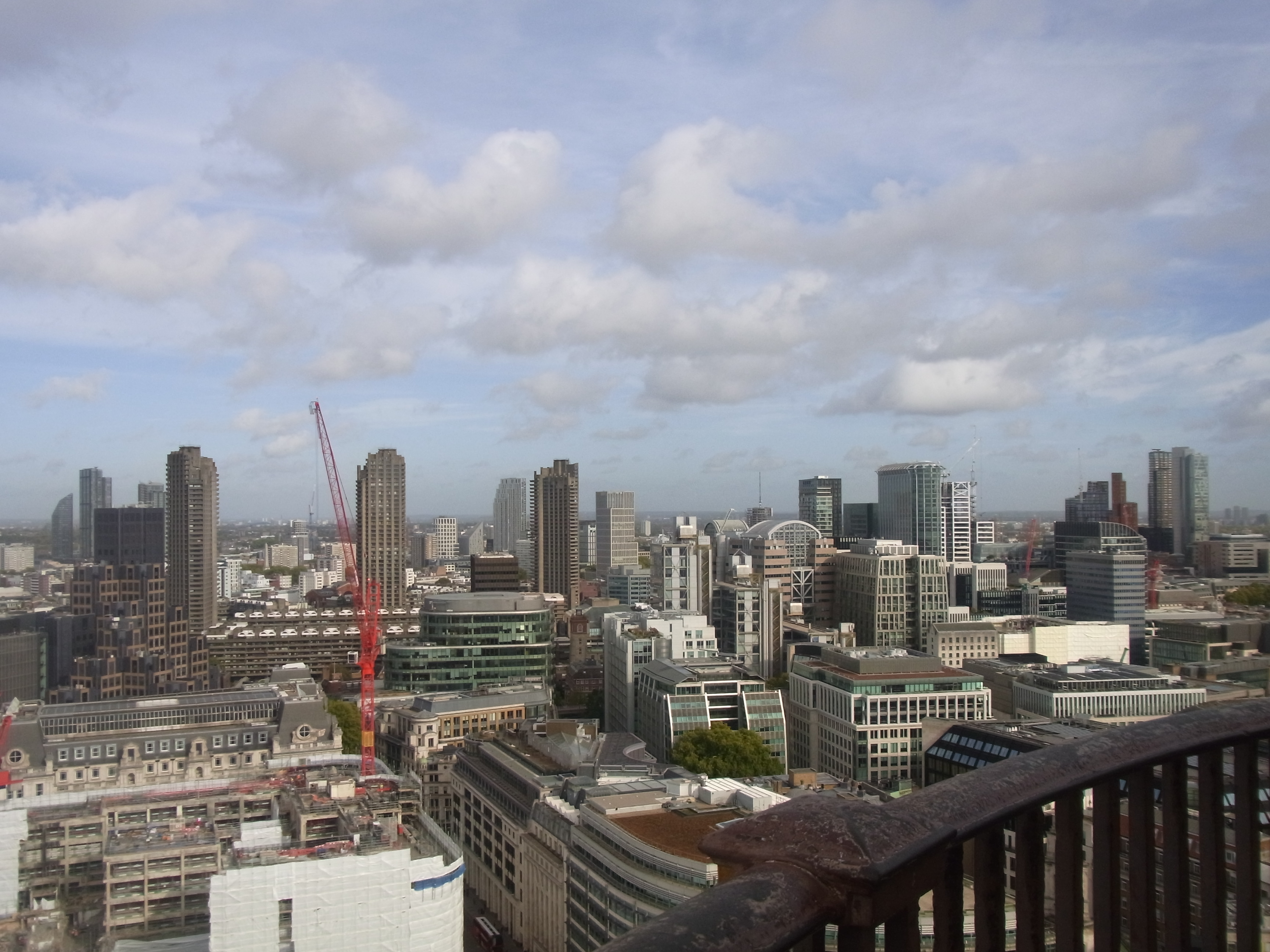
The "northern cluster" of the City of London. Some of the smaller skyscrapers shown here include: the Barbican Estate, Finsbury Tower, The Heron, Citypoint, One Crown Place, The Stage, Principal Tower and the Broadgate Tower. Also shown in the distance on the far left are 250 City Road and Lexicon Tower in the London Borough of Islington. Also approved for this cluster is the 154 m-tall (505 ft) 2–3 Finsbury Avenue and the 156 m-tall (512 ft) 13–14 Appold Street

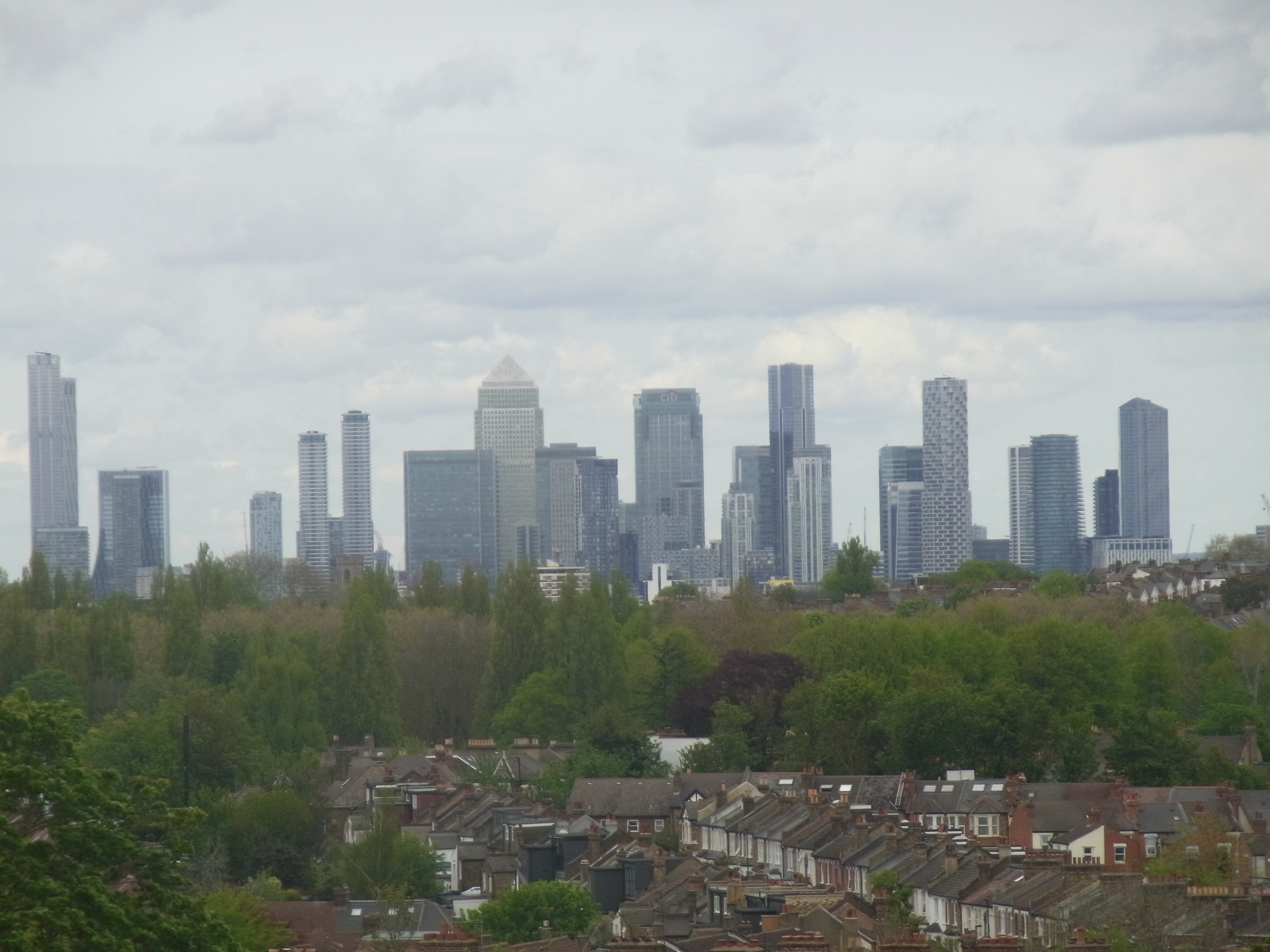
The Canary Wharf and Isle of Dogs business district as viewed from Blythe Hill Fields, London Borough of Lewisham, May 2021. The tallest building in this cluster is One Canada Square with the pyramid-shaped roof which was completed in 1991 and stands at 235 m. There are seven towers in this cluster that are at least 200 m tall with more planned and under construction. However, due to the proximity of London City Airport it is unlikely that any will exceed the height of One Canada Square

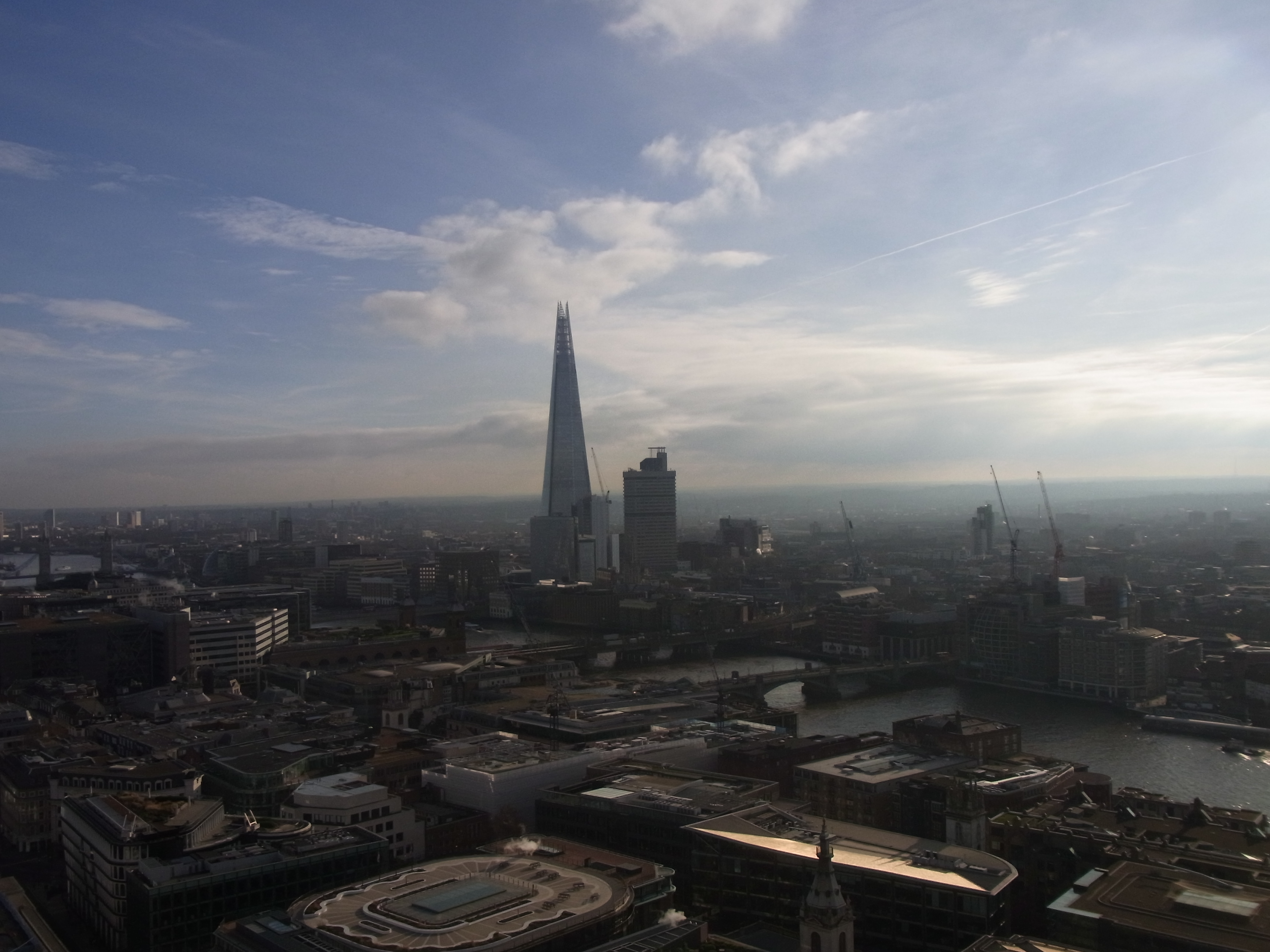
The skyline of Southwark, prominently featuring The Shard. Completed in 2012 at London Bridge, it is London's tallest building at 309.6 m. Shown here in December 2019 with Guy's Hospital to the right. Two more prominent high-rises will soon join the cluster: Chapter London Bridge a 133 m building that topped out in 2024, and Edge London Bridge at 109 m, now under construction.

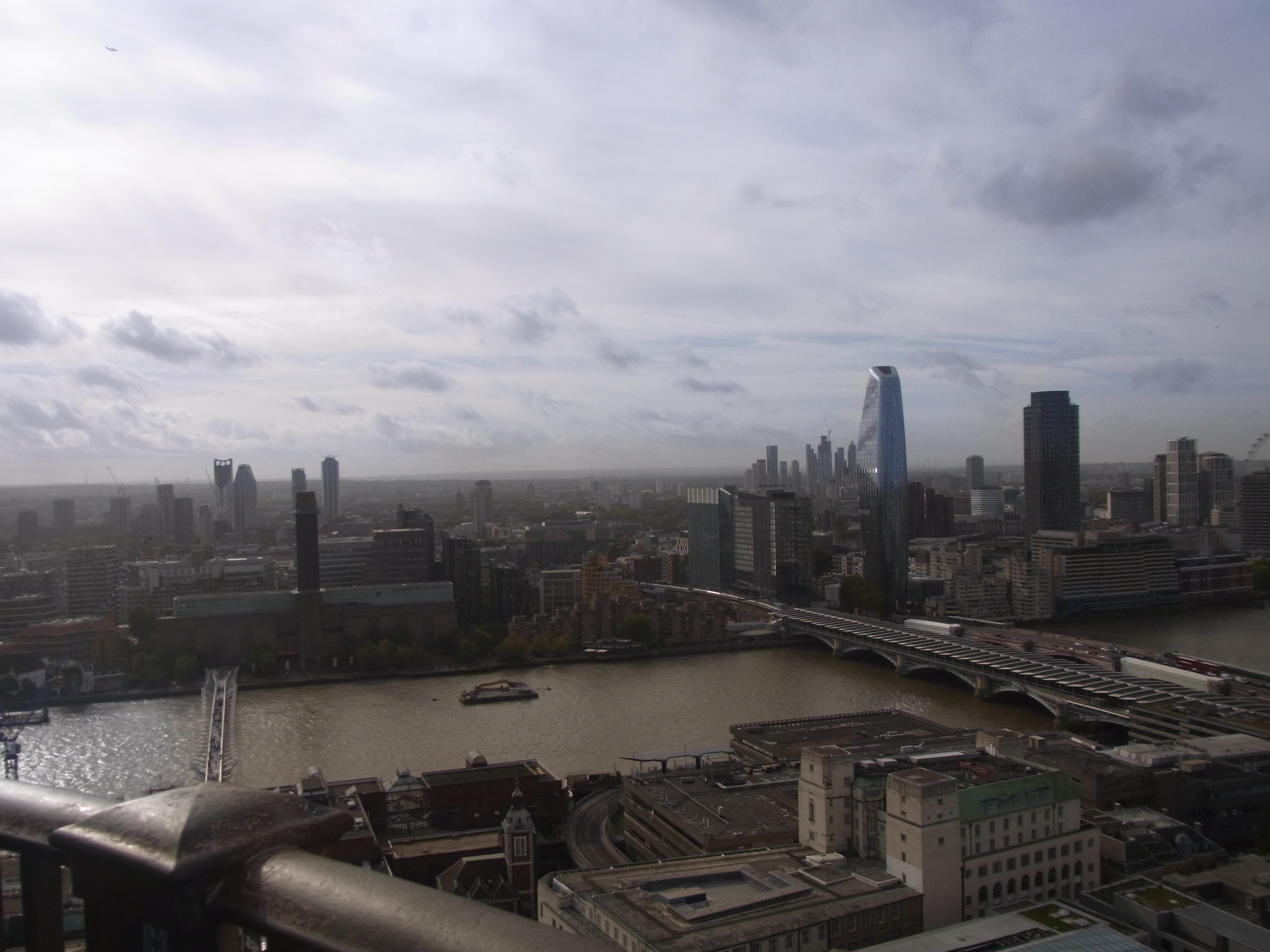
The emerging South Bank cluster as viewed from St Paul's Cathedral, October 2022. The two tallest towers here are One Blackfriars which was completed in 2018 at 163 m and the South Bank Tower that was originally constructed in 1972 at 111 m but was given an 11-storey height increase in 2017 to bring it up to 150 m. There are several more towers planned for this cluster ranging from between 100 m and 178.5 m tall. There is also an emerging cluster at Elephant and Castle shown on the far left which includes notably, Strata SE1 and another emerging cluster in the distance on the right at Vauxhall/Nine Elms

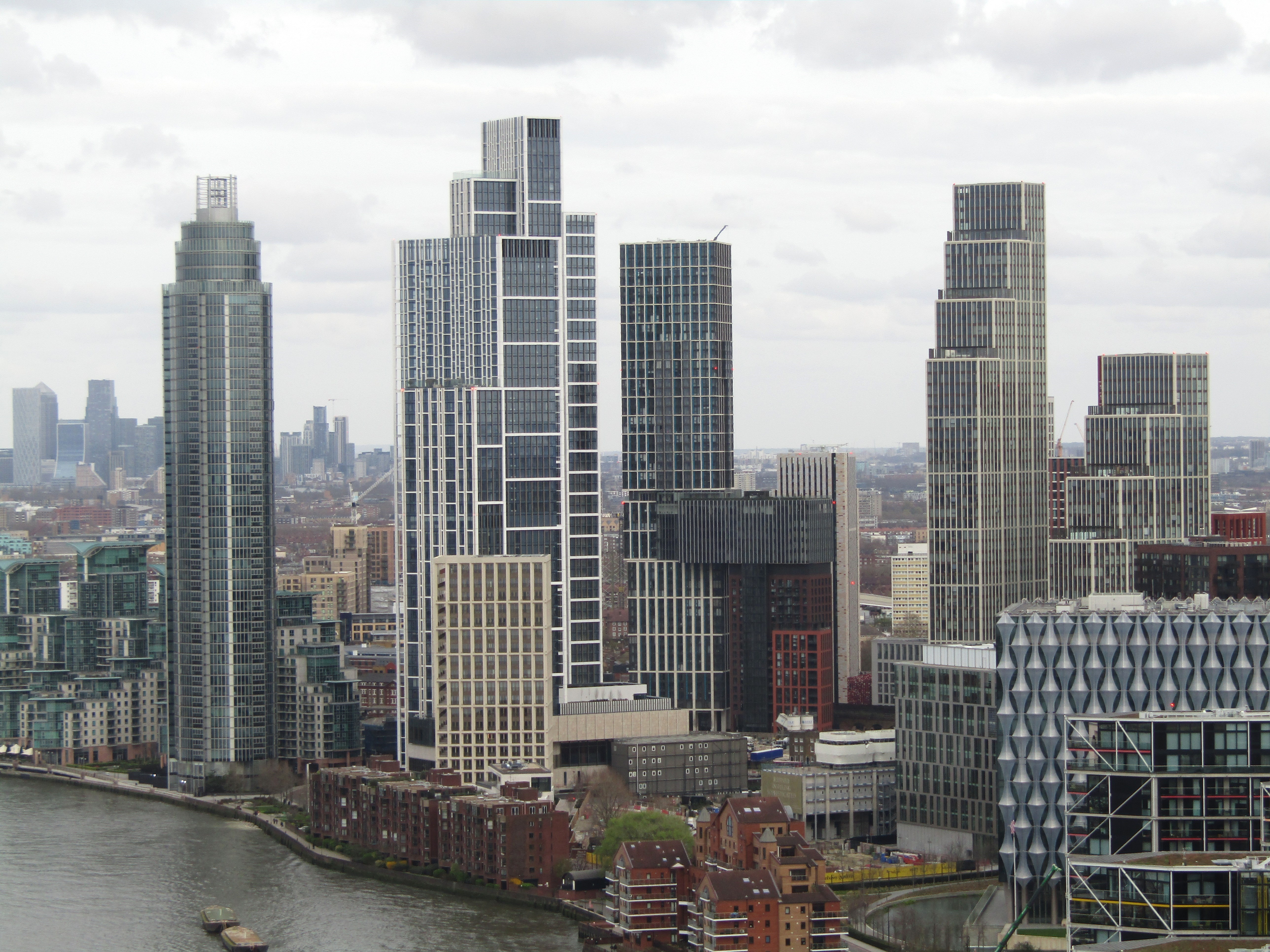
The emerging cluster at Vauxhall and Nine Elms, March 2024. There are currently five towers in this cluster that are between 160 m and 200 m tall: One Nine Elms City Tower (200m), St George Wharf Tower (181m), One Thames City No. 8 (177m), Aykon London One (168m) and One Nine Elms River Tower (161m). Within five years there will be seven towers in this cluster with heights between 160 m and 200 m

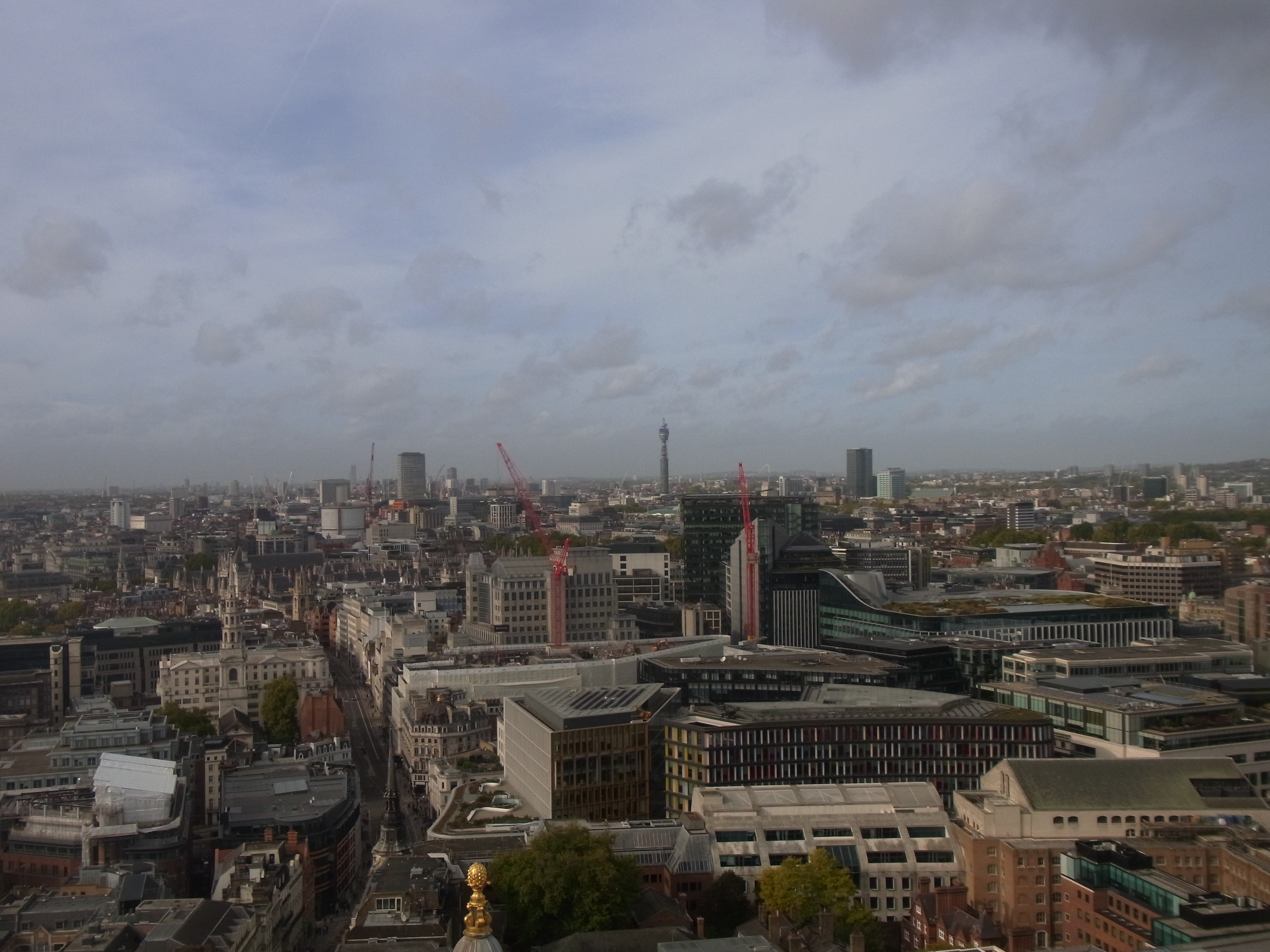
Looking towards the West End from St Paul's Cathedral, October 2022. Shown here from left to right are Centre Point, completed in 1966, the BT Tower, completed in 1964 and Euston Tower, completed in 1970. These are all considered among the first "skyscrapers" in London. Also seen in the far distance is the 184 m-tall (604 ft) One West Point Tower 1 in North Acton, which was completed in 2022 and where there will be an emerging cluster in the years to come

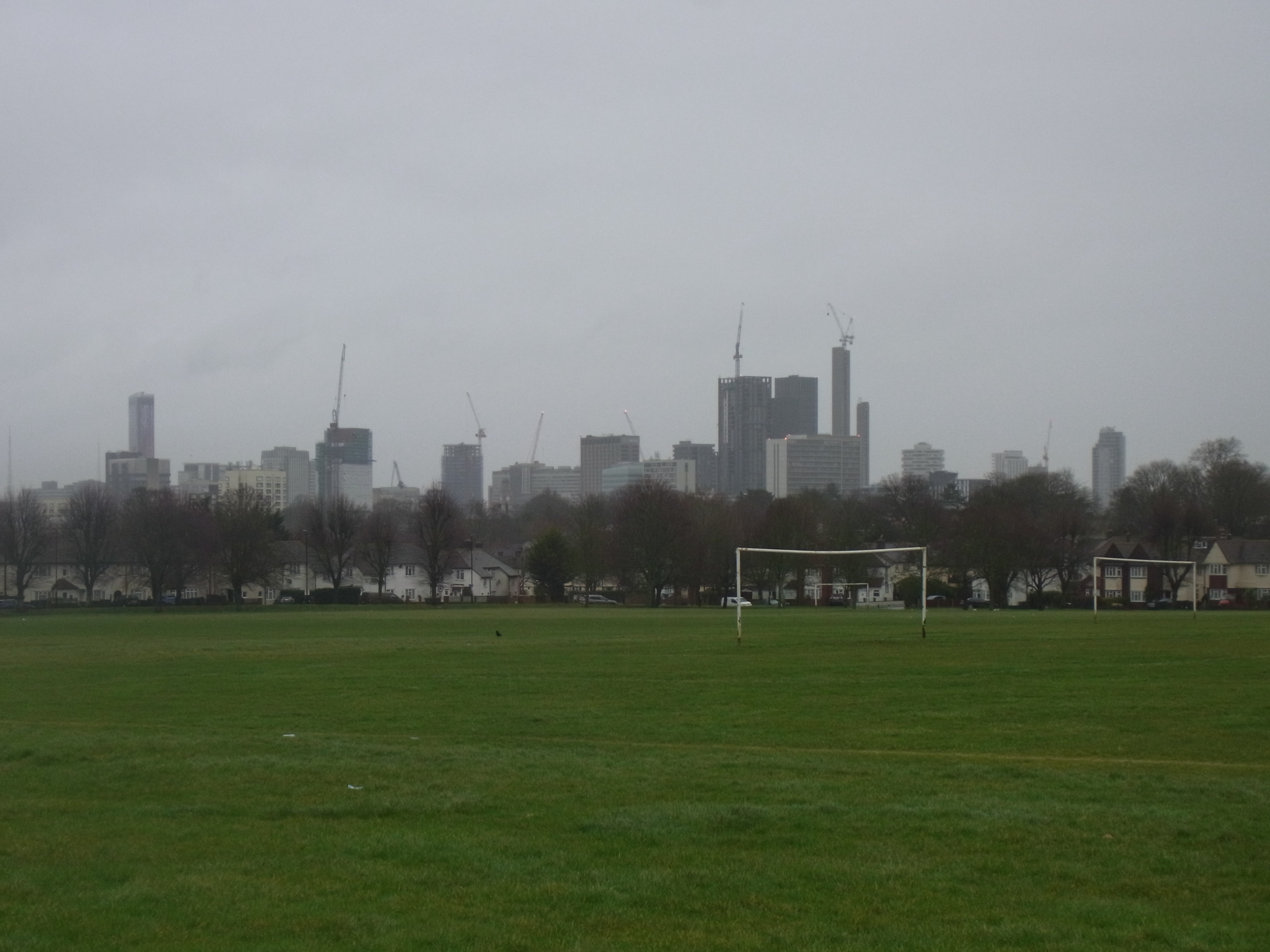
The emerging cluster in Croydon town centre which includes Saffron Square (134m), Queen's Quarter building 1 (114 m) and 101 George Street (135.6 m). Under construction is the now complete College Road Tower (150 m)

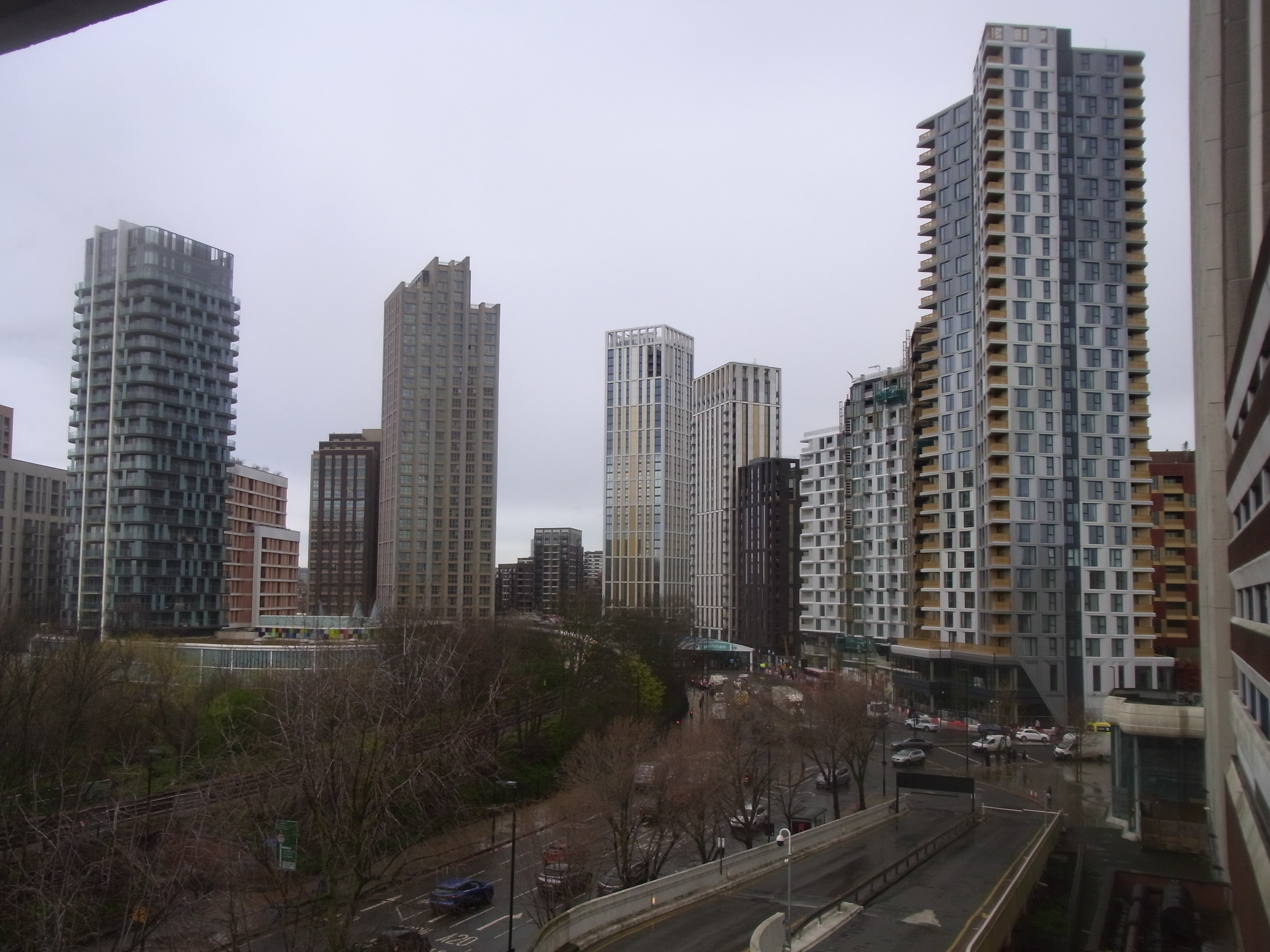
The emerging cluster in Lewisham also known as Lewisham Gateway, and first Borough of Sanctuary, which includes 209 Connington Road Tower at 117 m tall which is the white building in the centre and Lewisham Exchange at 105 m tall to the left of it. All of the high-rises shown in this picture are residential with the exception of the grey building shown in the immediate right foreground which was formerly the London offices of Citigroup until they relocated to 25 Canada Square at Canary Wharf in 2001

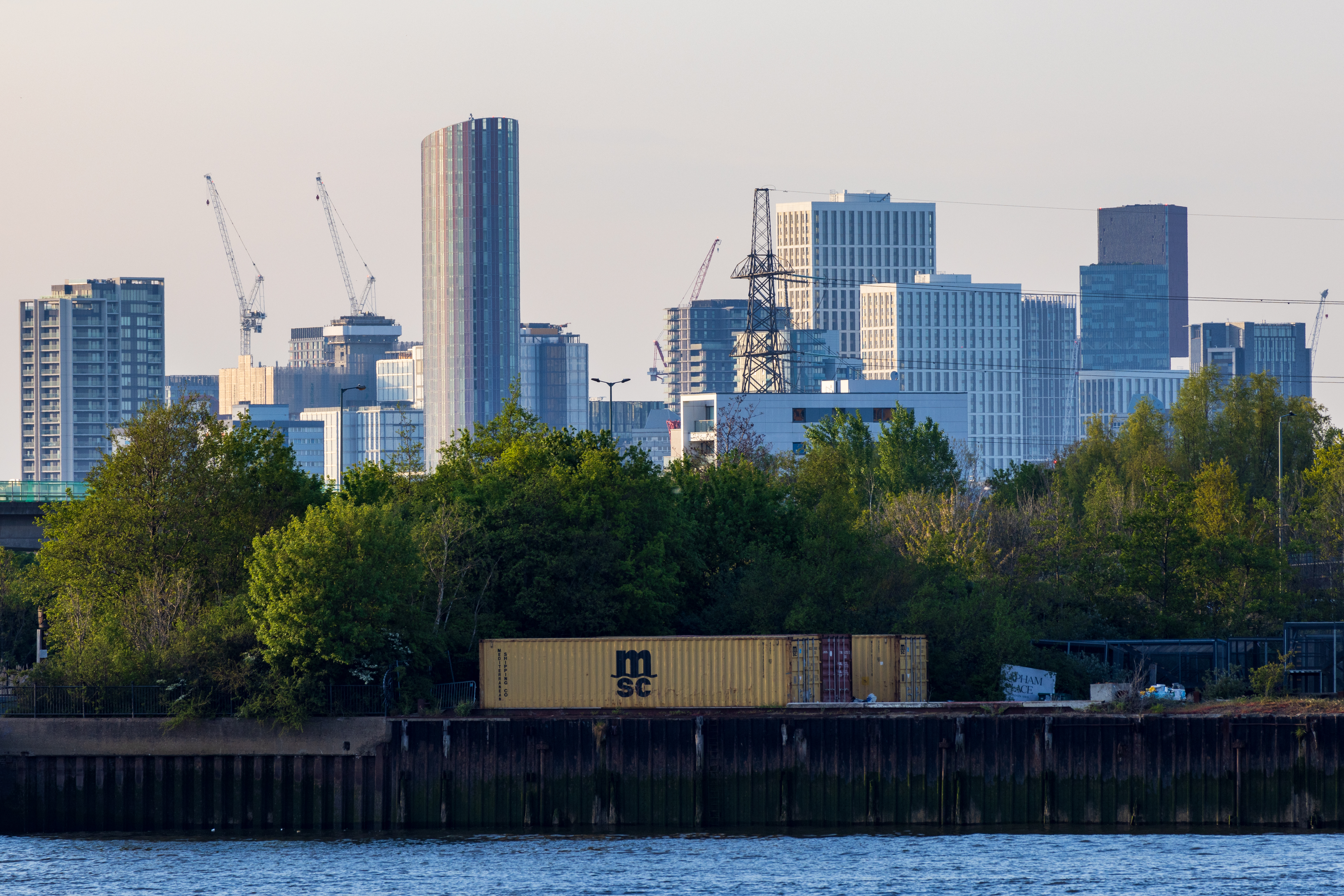
The emerging cluster in Stratford in April 2023 as viewed from Greenwich Peninsula. Stratford has been undergoing regeneration, associated with the 2012 Summer Olympics, which largely took place in Queen Elizabeth Olympic Park to the west of the cluster. Seen on the left is 150 High Street at a height of 135 m. The tallest building in the cluster, Manhattan Loft Gardens at 143 m, is seen at the back.

== See also ==
- Architecture of London
- List of tallest buildings and structures in Croydon
- City of London#Skyscrapers and tall buildings
- List of tallest buildings in the United Kingdom
- List of tallest structures in the United Kingdom

== Notes ==
=== Footnotes ===
A. This structure was destroyed by the Great Fire of London in 1666, allowing a shorter structure to become the tallest in the city.
B. The exact height of the Old St Paul's Cathedral remains unknown. Heights ranging between 140 metres (460 ft) and 150 metres (490 ft) have all been reported. The spire was destroyed by fire in 1561.
C. If counting the tallest habitable floors in buildings, then the record would be held between 1961 and 1962 by the Shell Centre, at 107 metres (351 ft) and having 26 floors; and before it by the Victoria Tower at 98.5 metres (323 ft), completed in 1858 and having 14 floors.
D. If the Crystal Palace Transmitter is excluded as a "building", then the record was held by the "Post Office Tower" (later The British Telecom Tower) from 1962 to 1980, at a height excluding antenna of 177 metres (581 ft) and containing 34 floors, and from 1980 to 1991 by Tower 42 at 183 metres (600 ft).
