= 99 Bishopsgate (new proposal) =

Proposed skyscraper in the City of London

Coordinates: 51.5159°N 0.0825°W

- Interactive map of the 99 Bishopsgate area

General information
- Location: 99 Bishopsgate, City of London, United Kingdom
- Owner: Brookfield Properties

Height
- Height: 240 m (790 ft)

Technical details
- Floor count: 54

Design and construction
- Architecture firm: RSHP
- Structural engineer: AKT II

99 Bishopsgate is an approved proposal for a skyscraper in the City of London. Plans for the replacement of the original 26-storey building were submitted in 2024.

Designed by architectural firm RSHP, the 54-storey tower will include approximately 99,000 m^{2} (1,070,000 sq ft) office space. A 6-storey pavilion building will be built alongside the tower which will provide cultural activities.

If the development goes ahead, at completion, the 240 metres (790 ft) tower will become the fifth-tallest building in the City of London, and the sixth-tallest in Greater London after 100 Leadenhall.

Planning permission for the proposal was approved on 31 January 2025, with construction slated to begin in 2026.

== See also ==
- List of tallest buildings and structures in London
- List of tallest buildings in the United Kingdom
