= NLV =

NLV may refer to:

== Places ==
- National Library of Vietnam, Hanoi
- North Las Vegas, Nevada, United States
- Mykolaiv Airport, Ukraine (by IATA code)

== Other uses ==
- Nanosatellite launch vehicle, in aerospace
- New Life Version, a bible translation
- New London Vernacular, a 2010s architectural style
- Northern Lighthouse Vessel, one of two Scottish/Manx ships
- Norwalk-like viruses, a genus of virus
