= 30 Marsh Wall =

Residential skyscraper in London

General information
- Type: Student accommodation
- Location: London, England
- Coordinates: 51.501686°N 0.024161°W

Height
- Roof: 156 m (512 ft)

Technical details
- Floor count: 48

Design and construction
- Architecture firm: EPR Architects
- Developer: Vita Group
- Main contractor: Tide Construction

30 Marsh Wall is a residential skyscraper under construction in Canary Wharf. Approved in 2022, plans involve a tower rising to 156 m (512 ft) over 48 storeys, and is expected to be the tallest purely student accommodation building when completed.

== Background ==
Plans were brought forward in early 2022 for a student accommodation skyscraper on the site. Planning permission was granted by Tower Hamlets council in early 2022, and then by the Great London Authority later that year. Designed by EPR Architects, designs involve a 156 m (512 ft), 48 storey tall tower, which is expected to be both the tallest student accommodation tower and one of the tallest 156 m (512 ft) modular buildings upon completion, forecast for 2028.

In 2025, a funding deal was secured with financing from Eldridge Real Estate. Demolition had been completed but construction was delayed due a backlog of the British Safety Regulator's Gateway 2 approvals which were finally completed by 2026.

== See also ==
- 25 Cuba
- List of tallest buildings and structures in London
