= 50 Fenchurch Street =

Skyscraper in London, England

Coordinates: 51.511743°N 0.080927°W

50 Fenchurch Street is a skyscraper under construction in the City of London. The 36-storey building is expected to be completed in 2028 at a height of 149.6 metres (491 feet). The skyscraper was designed by Eric Parry Architects.

The skyscraper is situated on the site of All Hallows Staining, a Grade I-listed church tower built in 1320. The tower is being suspended above the site while excavation and construction is taking place.

== History ==
Construction on 50 Fenchurch Street began in 2025.

== See also ==
- List of tallest buildings and structures in London
