= Pioneer Point =

Pioneer Point (North and South)
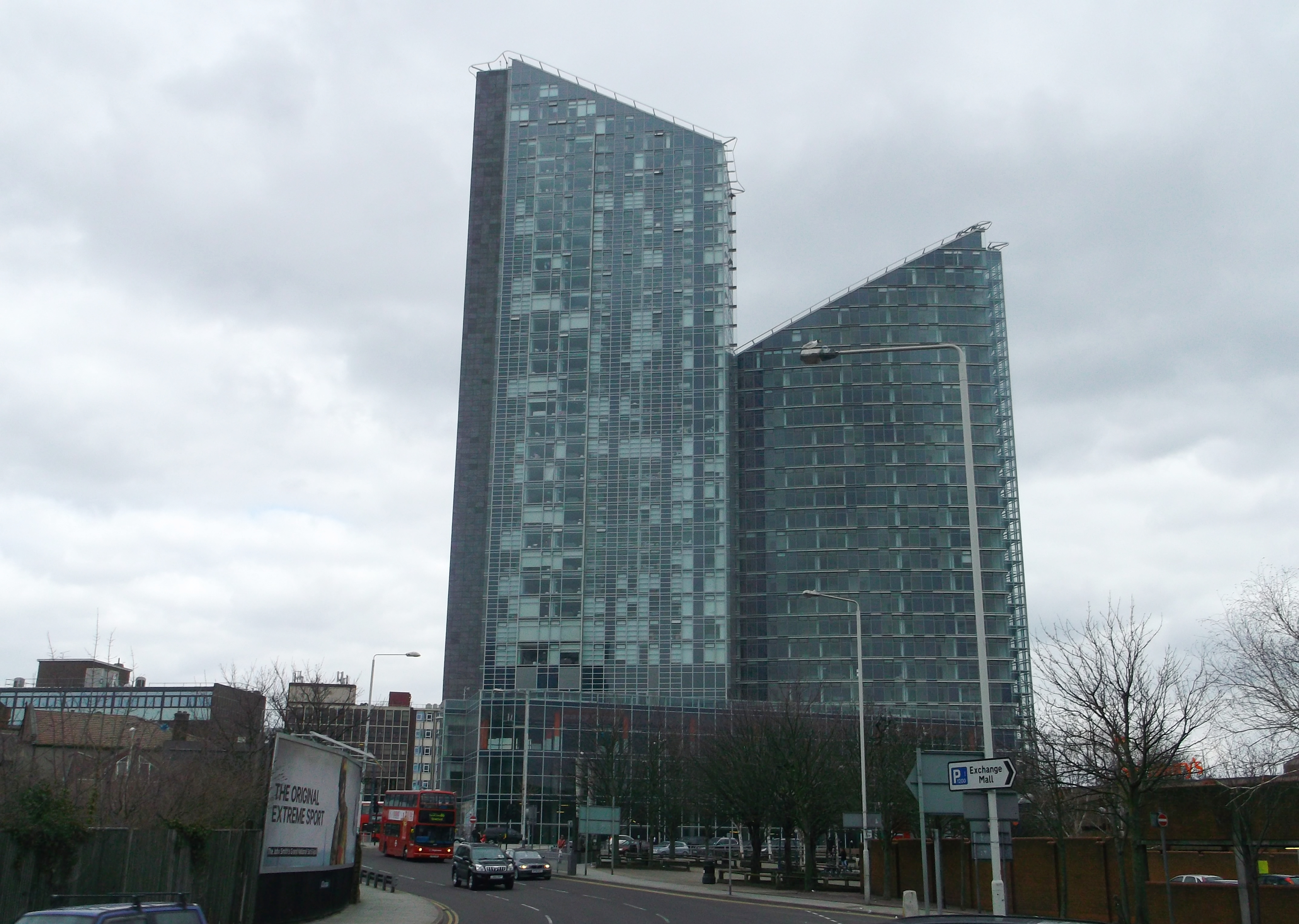
- Left: Pioneer Point North
- Interactive map of the Pioneer Point (North and South) area

General information
- Type: Commercial
- Location: Ilford, London, United Kingdom
- Coordinates: 51°33′25.157″N 00°04′14.133″E
- Construction started: 2009
- Completed: 2011; 15 years ago

Height
- Roof: North Tower 105 metres (344 ft); South Tower 82 metres (269 ft)

Technical details
- Floor count: North Tower, 33; South Tower, 25

Pioneer Point is a pair of tall buildings in the Ilford area of London, United Kingdom. It is owned by Canadian Real Estate investors, RealStar. Pioneer Point North is 105 metres (344 feet) tall with 33 floors and Pioneer Point South is 82 metres (269 feet) tall with 25 floors.

The mixed-use building contains residential units, a public gym, which occupies the second floor, and a restaurant. The buildings feature a lighting installation that displays daily video content with various colors, shapes, speeds, and directions.

Pioneer Point opened in 2011 on the site of the former Pioneer Market.

== See also ==
- Tall buildings in London
