= 55 Bishopsgate =

Approved skyscraper in the City of London

Coordinates: 51.5154°N 0.0828°W

- Interactive map of the 55 Bishopsgate area

General information
- Location: 55 Bishopsgate, City of London, United Kingdom
- Owner: Schroders

Height
- Height: 269 m (883 ft)

Technical details
- Floor count: 63

Design and construction
- Architecture firm: Arney Fender Katsalidis

55 Bishopsgate is an approved skyscraper in the City of London. Plans were submitted in 2022. If built, at 269 metres (883 ft) it would be the second-tallest building in the City of London, and the third-tallest in Greater London after The Shard and 22 Bishopsgate. The building will consist of 63 storeys. It was designed by architectural firm Arney Fender Katsalidis (AFK), and is being funded by the investment firm Schroders. Despite objections from Historic England, the scheme is currently recommended for approval from city planners.

Planning permission was approved on 21 July 2023. The scheme also includes an accompanying 22-storey building.

== See also ==
- List of tallest buildings and structures in London
