= One West Point =

High-rise development in London

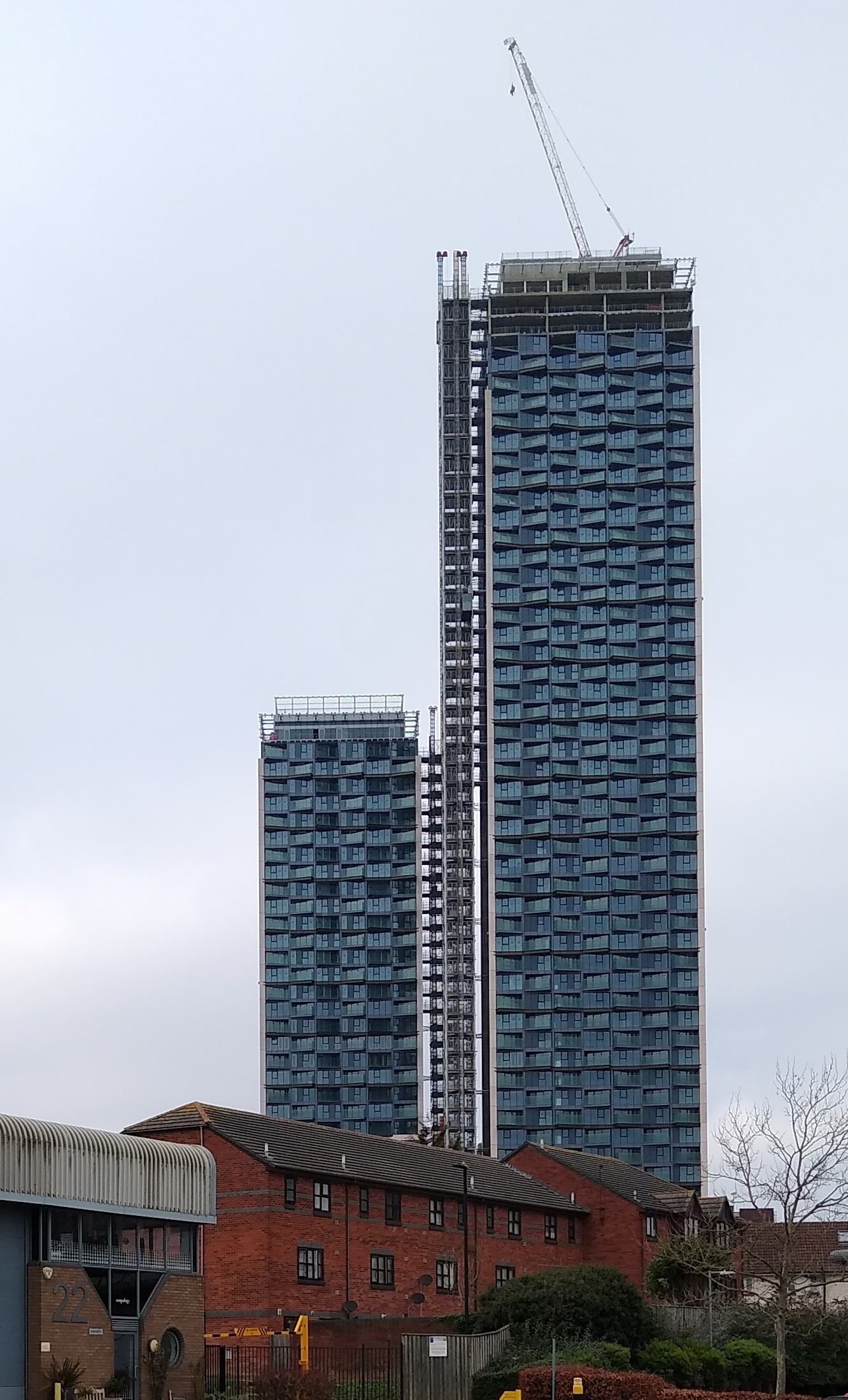
- One West Point nearing completion
- Interactive map of the One West Point area

General information
- Type: Residential
- Location: North Acton, London
- Coordinates: 51.5222°N 0.2620°W
- Construction started: 2019
- Completed: 2022

Height
- Roof: 184 m (604 ft)

Technical details
- Floor count: 57

Design and construction
- Architecture firm: BUJ Architects

One West Point, also previously known as Portal West is a residential highrise development in North Acton, London. It consists of four towers surrounding a central courtyard with the tallest "Icon Tower" rising to 184 m (604 ft). Reaching such a height would make it, at the time of completion in November 2022, the tallest residential building in London outside of Canary Wharf.

The development was led by City & Docklands, who had also worked in the development of the docklands, and designed by BUJ architects. Construction began in 2019 with planning permission being granted in 2017 and completed in 2022. It is part of a larger emergent cluster of skyscrapers and towers within the Old Oak Common and Park Royal regeneration area. A significant economic boost is expected to follow the construction of the HS2 servicing Old Oak Common station nearby.

== See also ==
- List of tallest buildings and structures in London
