= Ensign House =

Residential skyscraper in London

General information
- Type: Residential
- Location: London, England
- Coordinates: 51.501424°N 0.020831°W

Height
- Roof: 230 m (750 ft)

Technical details
- Floor count: 56

Design and construction
- Architecture firm: Maccreanor Lavington
- Developer: Far East Consortium

Ensign House is an approved residential skyscraper in Canary Wharf; planning permission was granted in 2022. Designed by Maccreanor Lavington the plans involve a 230 m (750 ft) tall tower over 56 storeys, although the full height includes a 25 structural spire.

== Background ==
Designs were drawn up by Maccreanor Lavington and plans submitted in 2022 by developers Far East Consortium, behind nearby Consort Place, for a tower "inspired by the approach taken by traditional tall buildings and American skyscrapers and the way in which they celebrate the top of the building with a striking silhouette". The development will see the demolition of a 1980s office building of the same name on the site to make way for a bronze-coloured tower rising to 230 m (750 ft).

== See also ==
- List of tallest buildings and structures in London
