= Maine Tower =

Coordinates: 51.4992°N 0.0200°W

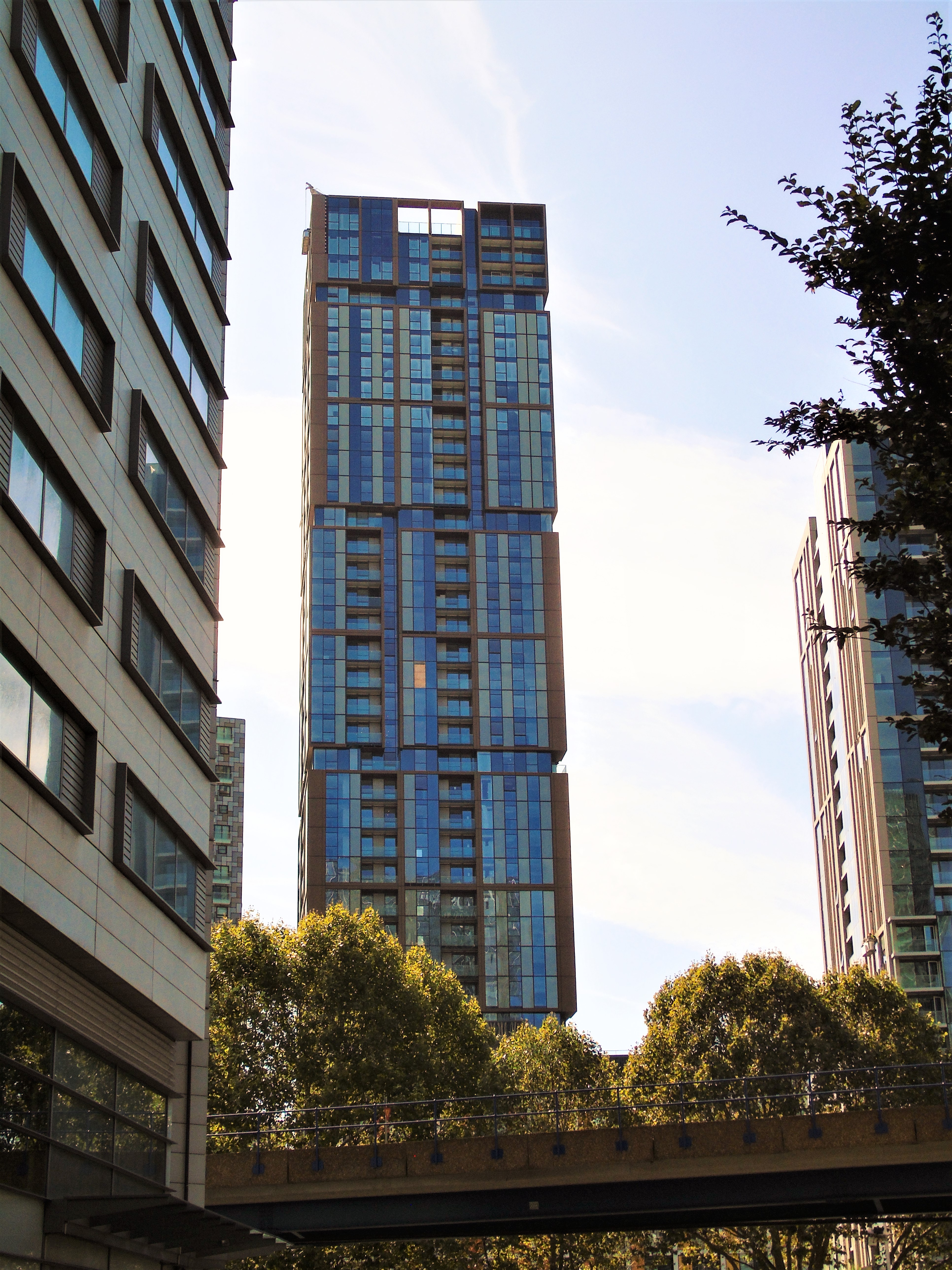
- Interactive map of the Maine Tower area

General information
- Status: Completed
- Location: London, E14; England
- Completed: 2019
- Client: Galliard Homes

Height
- Roof: 144 m (472 ft)

Technical details
- Floor count: 41

Maine Tower is a 41-storey residential building located between Lighterman's Road and Dockyard Lane on the Isle of Dogs forming part of the Harbour Central development at Canary Wharf, London.

Maine Tower consists of 297 apartments with a price starting at £655,000 for a one-bedroom unit. Harbour Central will total 642 apartments across five buildings. The building locates around 5-10 minutes walk south of Canary Wharf.

200 apartments offered for sale in July 2015 sold out in five hours.
