= 100 Leadenhall =

- Architectural drawing showing part of the planned building
- Interactive map of the 100 Leadenhall area

General information
- Status: Approved
- Type: Mixed-use
- Location: London, EC3
- Coordinates: 51.5137°N 0.0801°W
- Construction started: 2023
- Estimated completion: 2027
- Client: DP9; Lai Sun Development
- Owner: London & Oriental

Height
- Height: 263.4 metres (864 ft)

Technical details
- Floor count: 56

Design and construction
- Architects: Skidmore, Owings & Merrill

100 Leadenhall, nicknamed The Diamond, is a mixed-use development approved for the City of London. Designed by Skidmore, Owings & Merrill, the tower will be the financial district's third-tallest building upon completion. The wedge-shaped building will have a facade of elongated diamond shapes.

A spokesperson from St Paul's Cathedral said that the tower would have a "harmful impact" on the protected views of the cathedral, and a statement from the Tower of London expressed concern at the skyscraper's diminution of the "visual dominance" of the historic site. The City of London's planning and transportation committee voted 22–2 in favour of the 100 Leadenhall build in July 2018.

The development will include a free public viewing gallery, a restaurant, a bar and shops.

== See also ==
- List of tallest buildings and structures in London
