= Vauxhall Cross Island =

Planned skyscraper development in London

General information
- Type: Mixed use
- Location: Elephant and Castle, London, England
- Coordinates: 51.484826°N 0.125228°W

Height
- Roof: 185 m (607 ft) and 151 m (495 ft)

Technical details
- Floor count: 53 and 42

Design and construction
- Architecture firm: ZHA Architects

Vauxhall Cross Square is a planned skyscraper development in the Vauxhall area of London. The site, bordering Vauxhall bus station, is in the area of a number of redevelopments and an emerging skyscraper cluster. The development consists of two main towers of 53 and 42 storeys reaching heights of 185 m (607 ft) and 151 m (495 ft) respectively.

== History ==
=== Background ===
Developers VCI Property Holding Limited acquired the site from Kylun Ltd, and presented a scheme for redevelopment in 2018 but faced issues in acquiring planning permission. A public inquiry was launched following opposition to the development. The designs by ZHA Architects were finally granted planning permission in 2020 by Robert Jenrick, despite contravening policies on height and affordable housing. Jenrick described the design as "outstanding".

=== Status ===
Minor work was carried out in 2023 but limited by the lack of a necessary land swap with TfL, owners of the neighbouring Vauxhall Bus Station. As of 2026, there are no clear signs of work and the development is considered paused.
