= 25 Cuba =

Residential skyscraper in London

General information
- Type: Residential
- Location: London, England
- Coordinates: 51.501308°N 0.024236°W

Height
- Roof: 174 m (571 ft)

Technical details
- Floor count: 52

Design and construction
- Architecture firm: Morrison+Company
- Developer: Ballymore Group and Penta Real Estate

25 Cuba is a residential skyscraper under construction in Canary Wharf. The current plans were approved in 2025, and would involve a tower rising to 174 m (571 ft) over 52 storeys.

== Background ==
Plans were first put forward in 2017, with a design involving two towers with the taller rising to 41 storeys. In 2020, Morris+Company drew up new plans consisting of a single 174 m (571 ft) tower for developers Ballymore which were recommended for approval in early 2022. They were however put on hold and amended after fire safety concerns were raised over the presence of only a single staircase. Permission was finally granted later that year.

In 2024, plans were again changed to reduce the number of affordable homes as the number was not deemed viable, and in 2025 approval was again granted. In early 2026, a funding deal was agreed for the building between developers and Homes England and Barclays. Later that year, an application to include an emergency backup diesel generator in a children's play area was declined.

== See also ==
- Consort Place
- List of tallest buildings and structures in London
