= New London Vernacular =

Name for an architectural style of housing developments in London

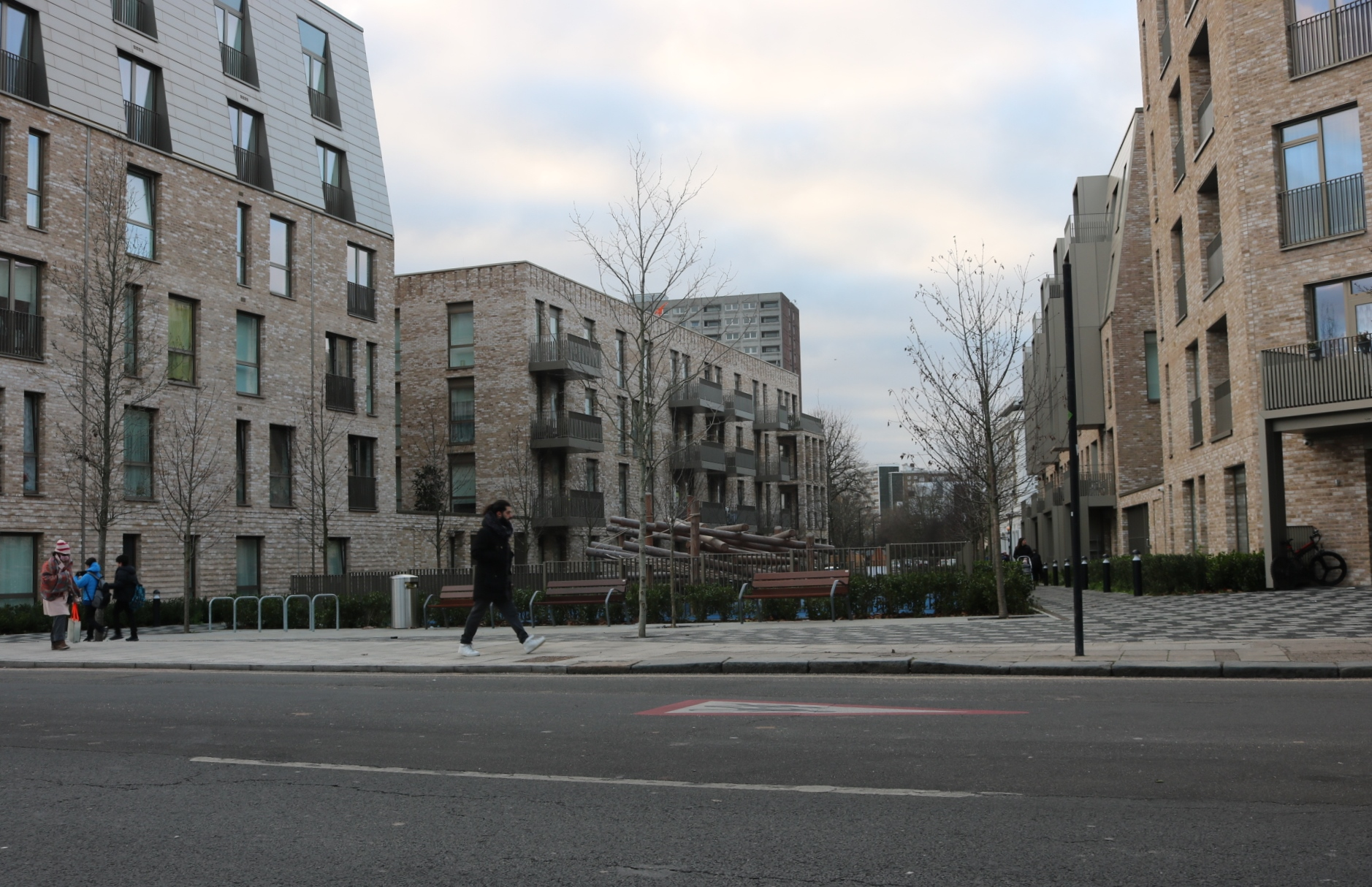
Flats on Kilburn Park Road

New London Vernacular is the name given to an architectural style of housing developments, observed in London, England, from about 2010. The style has a number of characteristics, notably flat elevations faced in brick cladding, portrait-shaped recessed windows, and the maximisation of homes having front-doors opening onto the street - all features found in London's extensive Georgian and Victorian terraced housing.

Although New London Vernacular has diverse antecedents, its development hinges primarily on a 2009 draft London Housing Design Guide published by the then Mayor of London, Boris Johnson. The guide makes an explicit call for the development of a New London Vernacular, albeit framed in terms of design principles and rules, rather than mandating a particular architectural style. Convergence on a singular style meriting its own appellation arises in part out of a perception that there exist few housing development solutions for high density housing that are appropriate to a broad range of households, and in part out of the exigencies of design, construction and sales risk minimisation after the 2008 Great Recession.

== Characteristics ==
The style was identified and characterised in a 2012 report by David Birkbeck and Julian Hart, for Urban Design London, in response to their observation of what appeared to be a consensus in detail and material, and the universal adoption of a street-based form and style, in entries for the 2012 Housing Design Awards. Features identified in the report include:

- maximisation of ground-floor homes having their own front door to the street
- ground floors taller than upper floors, often arranged to provide 2-storey maisonettes, and acting as podiums for upper floors
- elevations clad in brick, and having parapets; these sometimes acting as balustrades behind which are set top-floor flats
- top-floor flats configured as penthouses, or as wheelchair accessible flats, having private outdoor space behind balustrades
- use of short cores into the building, or galleries along upper floors, minimising the number of homes sharing an entrance path
- semi-private outdoor space visible from the public realm
- mix of on-street and underground parking
- portrait windows with regular grid patterns
- windows recessed in brick reveals
- balconies, often recessed with brick reveals

The style is summarised as having three markers: "lots of brick, deep-set portrait windows and flat facades".

New London Vernacular has been described as a "fundamentally democratic" style, particularly in the way in which it enables the mixing of owner-occupied and rented homes, and homes of a multiplicity of types and sizes, without there being any visual features distinguishing these. The style has been adopted by developers serving disparate target markets and having different business models, from social housing to investor-led for-profit developments.

== Antecedents and drivers ==
Birkbeck and Hart trace the New London Vernacular from a starting point of a late 20th-century loss of confidence in the design of public housing estates arising out of the very short lifespans exhibited by many 1970s developments. The 1999 final report of the Urban Task Force, Towards an Urban Renaissance, set out the connection between higher amenity provision and higher housing densities, and resulted in the 2000 White Paper [Our Towns and Cities – the Future; and revised guidance encouraging higher density proposals by removing previous planning restrictions in Planning policy guidance note 3: Housing, also published in 2000. In 2002 the Greater London Council mandated a 50% share of affordable housing in new developments from 2004, prompted developers to amend plans to increase the densities in their applications to meet this new requirement.

In 2007, Design for London, in a lessons-learned review of post-war high-density housing schemes, suggested that 'superdense' developments would succeed only if built to design rules. The Mayor of London responded by publishing, in 2009, a London Housing Design Guide Interim Edition which articulated the rules by which planners should judge new development proposals.
