= List of tallest buildings in the United Kingdom =

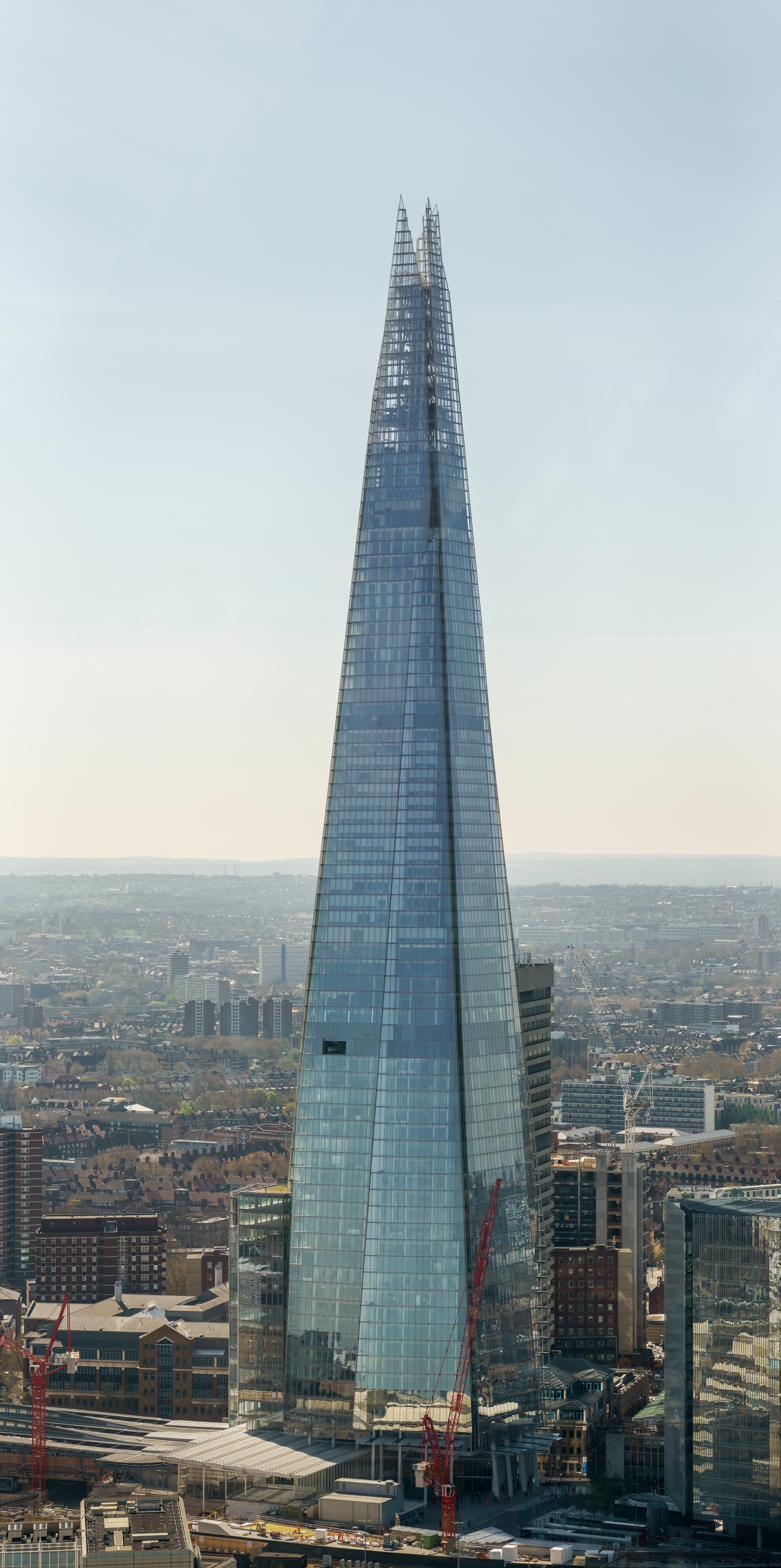
The Shard is the tallest building in the UK

As of November 2026, there are 183 habitable buildings (used for living or working, as opposed to masts or religious structures) in the United Kingdom that are at least 100 metres (330 ft) tall. Of these, 132 are in London, 28 in Greater Manchester, 12 in Birmingham, four in Leeds, two each in Liverpool and Woking, and one each in Brighton and Hove, Sheffield and Swansea (the only such building outside England).

The Shard in Southwark, London, is currently the tallest completed building in the UK and was the tallest in the European Union until the UK's departure in January 2020. It was topped out at a height of 309.6 m (1,016 ft) in March 2012, inaugurated in July 2012, and opened to the public in February 2013.

Historically, the nation's tallest structures were typically cathedrals, church spires, and industrial chimneys. Lincoln Cathedral held the title of the tallest building in the UK (and indeed the world) for several centuries. Completed in 1311, its central spire reached 160 metres (520 ft), but it collapsed in 1549 and was not rebuilt. At 111 metres (364 ft), St Paul's Cathedral was the tallest building in London from 1710. High-rise development in the capital was restricted if it obstructed protected views of the cathedral or other historic buildings. This protective policy, known as 'St Paul's Heights', has been in operation since 1937. St Paul's was eventually surpassed by the 119-metre (390 ft) Millbank Tower in 1963.

Since the turn of the 21st century, the number of high-rise buildings in London has grown significantly. The UK's tallest office buildings are all located in the City of London and the capital's secondary business district of Canary Wharf. The five tallest are 22 Bishopsgate at 278 m (912 ft), One Canada Square at 235 m (771 ft), Heron Tower at 110 Bishopsgate at 230 m (750 ft), 122 Leadenhall Street at 225 m (738 ft), and 8 Bishopsgate at 204 m (669 ft). The five tallest residential buildings in the UK are also in London: Landmark Pinnacle at 233 m (764 ft), Newfoundland at 220 m (720 ft), Aspen Tower at 216 m (709 ft), Valiant Tower at 215 m (705 ft), and One Park Drive at 205 m (673 ft).

Manchester, Birmingham and Salford are the only other UK cities with skyscrapers taller than 150 m (490 ft).

As of April 2026, there are 36 habitable buildings at least 100 m (330 ft) tall under construction in the UK: 22 in London, seven in Greater Manchester, four in Birmingham, and one each in Leeds, Glasgow and Sheffield.

== Tallest existing buildings ==
This list includes topped-out and completed buildings in the UK that stand at least 100 metres (330 ft) tall. Architectural height is considered, so masts and other elements added after the completion of the building are not considered.

Updated 28 January 2026

=== Buildings above 100 m ===
Is the tallest habitable building in the city
Was the UK's tallest habitable building upon completion
Was the city's tallest habitable building upon completion

Rank	Official name	Alternative names	Function	City (Note: See List of cities in the United Kingdom and Greater London)	County (Note: See Ceremonial counties of England and Local government in Wales)	Borough (Note: See London boroughs and Metropolitan borough)	Location	Image	Height (m)	Height (ft)	Floors (Note: Above ground only)	Year Completed	Notes
1	The Shard	Shard London Bridge, London Bridge Tower	Mixed-use	London	Greater London	Southwark	London Bridge		309.6	1,016	95 (72 habitable)	2012	
2	22 Bishopsgate	Twentytwo, Horizon 22, The Helter Skelter	Office	London	City of London	–	Financial District		278.2	913	62	2020	
3	One Canada Square	Canary Wharf DS7	Office	London	Greater London	Tower Hamlets	Canary Wharf		236	774	50	1990	
4	Landmark Pinnacle	The Pride, City Pride	Residential	London	Greater London	Tower Hamlets	Isle of Dogs		233.2	765	75	2020	
5	Salesforce Tower	110 Bishopsgate, Heron Tower	Office	London	City of London	–	Financial District		230	755	47	2010	
6	The Leadenhall Building	122 Leadenhall Street, "The Cheesegrater"	Office	London	City of London	–	Financial District		224.5	737	48	2013	
7	Newfoundland	Newfoundland Place, Diamond Tower	Residential	London	Greater London	Tower Hamlets	Canary Wharf		218	715	59	2020	
8	Aspen at Consort Place	Aspen Tower, Consort Place East Tower, Alpha Square Tower 1	Mixed-use	London	Greater London	Tower Hamlets	Isle of Dogs		216	708	65	2024	
9	Valiant Tower	South Quay Plaza Tower 1, Hampton Tower	Residential	London	Greater London	Tower Hamlets	Isle of Dogs		215	705	68	2021	
10	One Park Drive	Wood Wharf A1	Residential	London	Greater London	Tower Hamlets	Isle of Dogs		205	672	57	2021	
11	8 Bishopsgate	"The Jenga"	Office	London	City of London	–	Financial District		203.7	668	51	2022	
12	Deansgate Square South Tower	Owen Street Tower A	Residential	Manchester	Greater Manchester	City of Manchester	Castlefield		201	659	64	2018	
13=	8 Canada Square	Canary Wharf DS2, HSBC World Headquarters	Office	London	Greater London	Tower Hamlets	Canary Wharf		200	656	45	2001	
13=	25 Canada Square	Canary Wharf DS5, Citigroup Headquarters	Office	London	Greater London	Tower Hamlets	Canary Wharf		200	656	45	2001	
13=	City Tower	One Nine Elms East Tower, One Nine Elms Tower A	Residential / Retail	London	Greater London	Wandsworth	Nine Elms		200	656	58	2022	
16	Harcourt Gardens	Harcourt Tower, South Quay Plaza Tower 4	Residential	London	Greater London	Tower Hamlets	Canary Wharf		192	631	57	2024	
17	52 Lime Street	W. R. Berkley Corporation European Headquarters, "The Scalpel"	Office	London	City of London	–	Financial District		190	623	39	2018	
18	Wardian East Tower	Arrowhead Quay East Tower	Residential	London	Greater London	Tower Hamlets	Isle of Dogs		187	614	55	2019	
19	Icon Tower	One West Point Block A, Portal West Tower 1	Residential	London	Greater London	Ealing	North Acton		184	604	54	2021	
20=	Tower 42	NatWest Tower	Office	London	City of London	–	Financial District		183	600	43	1977/1995	
20=	Trinity Heights	Trinity Islands	Residential	Manchester	Greater Manchester	City of Manchester	Castlefield		183	600	60	2026	
22	Amory Tower	The Madison, Meridian Gate	Residential	London	Greater London	Tower Hamlets	Isle of Dogs		182	597	55	2020	
23	The Tower, One St George Wharf	Vauxhall Tower, St George Wharf Tower	Residential	London	Greater London	Lambeth	Vauxhall		181	593	52	2014	
24	30 St Mary Axe	Swiss Re Tower, "The Gherkin"	Office	London	City of London	–	Financial District		180	591	41	2003	
25=	BT Tower	GPO Tower; Post Office Tower, The Telecom Tower	Office	London	Greater London	Camden	Fitzrovia		177	581	37	1964	
25=	No. 8 Thames City	Nine Elms Square Building N8, New Covent Garden Market N8	Residential	London	Greater London	Wandsworth	Nine Elms		177	581	54	2021	
27	100 Bishopsgate		Office	London	City of London	–	Financial District		172	564	40	2018	
28	DAMAC Tower Nine Elms	New Bondway North Tower, DTNE, AYKON London One, "Jenga Tower"	Residential	London	Greater London	Lambeth	Vauxhall		170	558	50	2021	
29	Vista River Gardens	Vista River Gardens	Residential	Manchester	Greater Manchester	City of Manchester	Castlefield		169	555	55	2026	
30	Beetham Tower	Hilton Tower	Mixed-use	Manchester	Greater Manchester	City of Manchester	Castlefield		169	554	47	2006	
31	Wardian West Tower	Arrowhead Quay West Tower	Residential	London	Greater London	Tower Hamlets	Isle of Dogs		168	552	50	2019	
32	One Blackfriars	"The Vase", "The Boomerang"	Residential	London	Greater London	Southwark	Bankside		165	541	52	2018	
33	Enclave: Croydon	Tower A College Road, Croydon College Road Tower 1, Enclave: Croydon No. 27	Residential	London	Greater London	Croydon	East Croydon		163	535	50	2023	
34=	Broadgate Tower		Office	London	City of London	–	Broadgate		161	528	35	2007	
34=	Principal Tower	Principal Place Tower	Residential	London	Greater London	Hackney	Shoreditch		161	528	51	2018	
34=	River Tower	One Nine Elms West Tower, One Nine Elms Tower A, Park Hyatt London River Thames	Hotel	London	Greater London	Wandsworth	Nine Elms		161	528	43	2022	
37	20 Fenchurch Street	"The Walkie-Talkie"	Office	London	City of London	–	Financial District		160	525	38	2013	
38=	Deansgate Square East Tower		Residential	Manchester	Greater Manchester	City of Manchester	Castlefield		158	518	50	2018	
38=	One Leadenhall	1 Leadenhall Street	Office	London	City of London		Financial District		158	518	36	2024	
38=	One Thames Quay	Halcyon London, 225 Marsh Wall	Mixed-use	London	Greater London	Tower Hamlets	Isle of Dogs		158	518	49	2024	
41	One Churchill Place	Barclays Tower, Canary Wharf BP1	Office	London	Greater London	Tower Hamlets	Canary Wharf		156	512	32	2004	
42	40 Leadenhall Street	Stanza London, "Gotham City Building", Leadenhall Triangle	Office	London	City of London	–	Financial District		155	510	35	2022	
43=	The Octagon		Residential	Birmingham	West Midlands	City of Birmingham	Paradise		155	509	49	2024	
43=	One Eastside		Residential	Birmingham	West Midlands	City of Birmingham	Eastside		155	509	51	2025	
45	Three60	The Cylinder	Residential	Manchester	Greater Manchester	City of Manchester	Castlefield		154	506	51	2024	
46	The Blade		Residential	Manchester	Greater Manchester	City of Manchester	Castlefield		153	503	51	2023	
47=	25 Bank Street	Canary Wharf HQ2, JPMorgan Tower	Office	London	Greater London	Tower Hamlets	Canary Wharf		153	502	33	2002	
47=	40 Bank Street	Canary Wharf HQ3	Office	London	Greater London	Tower Hamlets	Canary Wharf		153	502	33	2003	
47=	Elizabeth Tower	Crown Street	Residential	Manchester	Greater Manchester	City of Manchester	Castlefield		153	502	52	2021	
50	Cortland at Colliers Yard		Residential	Salford	Greater Manchester	City of Salford	Greengate		152	500	50	2022	
51	10 Upper Bank Street	Canary Wharf HQ5, Clifford Chance Headquarters	Office	London	Greater London	Tower Hamlets	Canary Wharf		151	495	32	2003	
52	Southbank Tower	South Bank Tower, King's Reach Tower	Residential	London	Greater London	Southwark	South Bank		151	494	41	1971/2016	
53=	10 Park Drive	Wood Wharf A3	Residential	London	Greater London	Tower Hamlets	Isle of Dogs		150	492	43	2019	
53=	Arena Tower	Baltimore Tower, Baltimore Wharf Tower, "The Slinky"	Residential	London	Greater London	Tower Hamlets	Isle of Dogs		150	492	45	2016	
54	Carrera Tower	250 City Road Tower 1	Residential	London	Greater London	Islington	St Luke's		150	491	43	2021	
55	Highpoint	360 London, Castilla, 80 Newington Butts, UNCLE Elephant & Castle	Residential	London	Greater London	Southwark	Elephant & Castle		149	489	45	2018	
56	Guy's Tower	Guy's Hospital Tower, User and Communications Tower	Public facility	London	Greater London	Southwark	London Bridge		149	488	34	1973/2014	
57	Strata	Castle House, Strata SE1, "The Electric Razor"	Residential	London	Greater London	Southwark	Elephant and Castle		148	486	43	2010	
58	Pan Peninsula East Tower	One Millharbour, Millharbour East Tower	Residential	London	Greater London	Tower Hamlets	Isle of Dogs		147	483	48	2007	
59	One Bank Street	Heron Quays West 2	Office	London	Greater London	Tower Hamlets	Canary Wharf		146	479	28	2019	
60	Maine Tower	2 Millharbour Block D, Harbour Central Block D	Residential	London	Greater London	Tower Hamlets	Isle of Dogs		145	476	42	2020	
61	Manhattan Loft Gardens	The Stratford	Residential	London	Greater London	Newham	Stratford		143	469	43	2019	
62	Deansgate Square West Tower		Residential	Manchester	Greater Manchester	City of Manchester	Castlefield		141	463	44	2018	
63	West Tower	Beetham West Tower	Mixed-use	Liverpool	Merseyside	City of Liverpool	Prince's Dock		140	459	40	2007	
64	The Fernley	First Street Plot 11 Building D, Square Gardens	Residential	Manchester	Greater Manchester	City of Manchester	Castlefield		139	456	45	2024	
65=	Landmark East Tower	22 Marsh Wall	Residential	London	Greater London	Tower Hamlets	Isle of Dogs		137	449	44	2010	
65=	Valencia Tower	250 City Road Tower 2	Mixed-use	London	Greater London	Islington	St Luke's		137	449	36	2022	
67=	Viadux Building B2	Viadux Tower 1	Residential	Manchester	Greater Manchester	City of Manchester	Castlefield		136	446	40	2023	
67=	Charrington Tower	Providence Tower	Residential	London	Greater London	Tower Hamlets	Blackwall		136	446	44	2015	
69	Ten Degrees Croydon	101 George Street, George Street Modular Tower	Residential	London	Greater London	Croydon	East Croydon		136	445	44	2019	
70	Arena Point	Merrion Way	style="background-color:#aaff7f;color:black;" |Student residential	Leeds	West Yorkshire	City of Leeds	Arena Quarter		134	445	45	2025	
71	One Bishopsgate Plaza	150 Bishopsgate, Four Seasons Hotel and Residences at Heron Plaza, Pan Pacific Hotel London	Mixed-use	London	City of London	–	Bishopsgate		135	443	43	2021	
72	Saffron Square	Saffron Tower, Pinnacle Apartments, Wellesley Square Block F	Residential	London	Greater London	Croydon	West Croydon		134	440	44	2016	
73	Atlas	The Atlas Building, 145 City Road Residential Tower	Residential	London	Greater London	Hackney	St Luke's		134	438	40	2018	
74	Stratford Halo	150 High Street, Stratford, Spirit of Stratford Block A	Residential	London	Greater London	Newham	Stratford		133	436	41	2012	
75	The Mercian	2one2 Broad Street, Broad Street Tower	Residential	Birmingham	West Midlands	City of Birmingham	Westside		132	433	42	2021	
76	Two Fifty One	Eileen House	Residential	London	Greater London	Southwark	Elephant and Castle		131	430	43	2018	
77	Anaconda Cut	100 Greengate, Exchange Court	Residential	Salford	Greater Manchester	City of Salford	Greengate		131	428	44	2018	
78	Bankside at Colliers Yard		Residential	Salford	Greater Manchester	City of Salford	Greengate		129	423	43	2024	
79	Cherry Park Building A1		Residential	London	Greater London	Newham	Stratford		129	422	39	2022	
80	Legacy House	One West Point Block C, Portal West Tower 2	Residential	London	Greater London	Ealing	North Acton		128	421	36	2021	
81	10 George Street	Wood Wharf E1/E2, The GRID Building	Residential	London	Greater London	Tower Hamlets	Isle of Dogs		128	420	35	2020	
81=	40 Marsh Wall	Novotel Canary Wharf	Hotel	London	Greater London	Tower Hamlets	Isle of Dogs		128	419	39	2016	
81=	Keybridge	Keybridge House Building A, Keybridge Lofts	Residential	London	Greater London	Lambeth	Vauxhall		128	419	37	2020	
84	CityPoint	Britannic Tower, Britannic House	Office	London	City of London	–	Moorgate		127	417	36	1967/2000	
85	Great Charles Street		Residential	Birmingham	West Midlands	City of Birmingham	Jewellery Quarter		126	413	39	T/O	
85=	Nine Elms Point, Albert Point	Nine Elms Point Tower 1, Waterford Point	Residential	London	Greater London	Wandsworth	Nine Elms		126	412	37	2019	
85=	Sirocco Tower	2 Millharbour Block C, Harbour Central Block C	Residential	London	Greater London	Tower Hamlets	Isle of Dogs		126	412	36	2019	
88	The Willis Building	51 Lime Street West Building	Office	London	City of London	–	Financial District		125	410	28	2006	
89	No. 9 Thames City	Nine Elms Square Building N9, New Covent Garden Market N9	Residential	London	Greater London	Wandsworth	Nine Elms		125	409	36	2021	
89=	Euston Tower*	286 Euston Road	Office	London	Greater London	Camden	Somers Town		124	407	36	1970	*Redevelopment proposed
89=	One The Elephant	St Mary's Residential Tower	Residential	London	Greater London	Southwark	Elephant and Castle		124	407	37	2016	
92	The Founding	Canada Water Plot A1	Mixed-use	London	Greater London	Southwark	Surrey Quays		124	406	35	T/O	
92=	Cromwell Tower		Residential	London	City of London	–	Barbican		123	404	42	1972	
92=	Lauderdale Tower		Residential	London	City of London	–	Barbican		123	404	43	1973	
92=	Shakespeare Tower		Residential	London	City of London	–	Barbican		123	404	43	1976	
92=	One Crown Place South	One Crown Place Tower 2	Residential	London	City of London	–	Broadgate		123	404	35	2021	
97	Stratosphere Tower	Broadway Chambers Building 1	Residential	London	Greater London	Newham	Stratford		123	403	38	2017	
98	One Casson Square	Shell Centre Building B4A	Residential	London	Greater London	Lambeth	South Bank		122	401	37	2019	
98=	10 Holloway Circus	Holloway Circus Tower, Beetham Tower, Radisson Tower	Hotel / Residential	Birmingham	West Midlands	City of Birmingham	Southside		122	400	39	2006	
98=	Alta Tower at Consort Place	Alta Tower, Consort Place West Tower, Alpha Square Tower 2	Residential	London	Greater London	Tower Hamlets	Isle of Dogs		122	400	34	2024	
98=	Deansgate Square North Tower		Residential	Manchester	Greater Manchester	City of Manchester	Castlefield		122	400	37	2018	
98=	Pan Peninsula West Tower	One Millharbour, Millharbour West Tower	Residential	London	Greater London	Tower Hamlets	Isle of Dogs		122	400	39	2007	
98=	Chelsea Waterfront West Tower	Chelsea Waterfront Tower 1, Waterfront Drive Tower 1	Residential	London	Greater London	Kensington and Chelsea	Chelsea Harbour		122	400	37	2019	
104	Vauxhall Sky Gardens	Sky Gardens Nine Elms	Residential	London	Greater London	Wandsworth	Nine Elms		120	394	35	2017	
104=	Crown View		Residential	Manchester	Greater Manchester	City of Manchester	NOMA		119	390	37	2024	
104=	Millbank Tower*	Vickers Building	Office	London	Greater London	City of Westminster	Millbank		119	390	33	1963	*Under redevelopment
106=	25 Churchill Place	Canary Wharf BP4	Office	London	Greater London	Tower Hamlets	Canary Wharf		118	387	24	2013	
106=	CIS Tower	Co-operative Insurance Tower	Office	Manchester	Greater Manchester	City of Manchester	NOMA		118	387	25	1962	
106=	St Helen's	Aviva Tower, Commercial Union Tower	Office	London	City of London	–	Financial District		118	387	28	1969/1993	
109=	209 Conington Road		Residential	London	Greater London	Lewisham	Lewisham		117	385	34	2024	
109=	Centre Point	Centre Point Tower	Office	London	Greater London	Camden	West End		117	385	35	1967/2018	
111	Empress State Building		Office	London	Greater London	Hammersmith and Fulham	West Brompton		117	384	31	1961/2003	
112	Victoria Square Tower 1		Residential	Woking	Surrey	–	Town Centre		117	383	34	2022	
113	uhaus	Affinity Living Circle Square, Circle Square Block 1, Circle Square Building 6	Residential	Manchester	Greater Manchester	City of Manchester	Chorlton-on-Medlock		115	378	38	2021	
114=	20–22 Ropemaker Street	20 Ropemaker	Office	London	City of London	–	Moorgate		115	377	27	2022	
114=	Chronicle Tower	The Lexicon, Lexicon Tower, City Road Basin Site C, 261 City Road	Residential	London	Greater London	Islington	St Luke's		115	377	35	2016	
114=	Miles Street	Rudolf Place	Student accommodation	London	Greater London	Lambeth	Vauxhall		115	377	37	2021	
114=	The Stage	The Stage Shoreditch	Mixed-use	London	Greater London	Hackney	Shoreditch		115	377	38	2021	
118	Fold Building	Queen's Quarter Block 1, Taberner House Block 1	Residential	London	Greater London	Croydon	Town Centre		115	376	35	2021	
119=	Altus House	Hume House	Residential	Leeds	West Yorkshire	City of Leeds	Arena Quarter		114	374	38	2021	
119=	17&Central Building A	Mall redevelopment Building A	Residential	London	Greater London	Waltham Forest	Walthamstow		114	374	34	T/O	
121	TwelveTrees Park Building N01A	Stephenson Street Site N01A	Residential	London	Greater London	Newham	West Ham		113	372	35	T/O	
122=	50–60 Charter Street Tower 1	Wood Wharf J1	Residential	London	Greater London	Tower Hamlets	Canary Wharf		113	371	34	2024	
122=	Insignia Point	East Village Plot N08 Tower 2, Victory Plaza Insignia Point	Residential	London	Greater London	Newham	Stratford		113	371	30	2018	
122=	1 Beorma Place	Beorma Quarter, Beorma Tower	Office / Residential	Birmingham	West Midlands	City of Birmingham	Digbeth		113	371	30	T/O	
125=	Cassini Tower	White City Living Cassini, White City Living Building E1, The Water Gardens	Residential	London	Greater London	Hammersmith and Fulham	White City		112	368	35	2022	
125=	Manor Road Quarter Block A		Residential	London	Greater London	Newham	Canning Town		112	368	33	2024	
125=	Chapter London Spitalfields	100 Middlesex Street, Rodwell House Redevelopment, Nido Spitalfields	Student accommodation	London	Greater London	Tower Hamlets	Spitalfields		112	368	34	2008	
125=	The Lexington		Residential	Liverpool	Merseyside	City of Liverpool	Prince's Dock		112	368	35	2021	
129=	Union		Residential	Manchester	Greater Manchester	City of Manchester	St John's		112	367	33	2024	
129=	The Heron	Milton Court, Homes in the Heron	Residential	London	City of London	–	Moorgate		112	367	35	2012	
131	Sky View Tower	Capital Towers	Residential	London	Greater London	Newham	Stratford		112	366	35	2017	
132=	Cortland Broad Street	The Square	Residential	Birmingham	West Midlands	City of Birmingham	Westside		111	364	35	2023	
132=	The Silver Yard	Exchange Square 2	Residential	Birmingham	West Midlands	City of Birmingham	Eastside		111	364	36	2024	
134=	Affinity Living Riverview		Residential	Salford	Greater Manchester	City of Salford	Greengate		110	361	35	2021	
134=	Bridgewater Place	"The Dalek"	Mixed-use	Leeds	West Yorkshire	City of Leeds	Holbeck Urban Village		110	361	32	2006	
134=	Tower B College Road	Croydon College Road Tower 2	Residential	London	Greater London	Croydon	East Croydon		110	361	35	2023	
134=	Angel Gardens		Residential	Manchester	Greater Manchester	City of Manchester	NOMA		110	361	35	2019	
138	Dollar Bay		Residential	London	Greater London	Tower Hamlets	Isle of Dogs		109	358	32	2016	
139	Oxygen Towers		Residential	Manchester	Greater Manchester	City of Manchester	New Islington		109	357	33	2021	
140=	1 West India Quay	London Marriott Hotels & Resorts West India Quay, London Marriott Hotels & Resorts Canary Wharf, No. 1 West India Quay	Hotel	London	Greater London	Tower Hamlets	Canary Wharf		108	354	36	2004	
140=	103 Colmore Row		Office	Birmingham	West Midlands	City of Birmingham	Colmore Business District		108	354	24	2021	
142	TwelveTrees Park Building S01A	Stephenson Street Site S01A	Residential	London	Greater London	Newham	West Ham		107	352	33	2024	
143=	Hale Works	Anthology Hale Works	Residential	London	Greater London	Haringey	Tottenham Hale		107	351	33	2021	
143=	Embankment Exchange		Residential	Salford	Greater Manchester	City of Salford	Greengate		107	351	35	2023	
143=	City Tower	Sunley House	Office	Manchester	Greater Manchester	City of Manchester	Central Business District		107	351	30	1965	
143=	Shell Centre	Upstream Building	Office	London	Greater London	Lambeth	South Bank		107	351	26	1961/2008	
143=	The Tower, Meridian Quay	Seagate Tower	Residential	Swansea	City and County of Swansea	City of Swansea	Maritime Quarter		107	351	29	2007	
148=	HYLO	Finsbury Tower (Extension)	Office	London	Greater London	Islington	Finsbury		106	348	28	1967/2021	
148=	Bridgewater Heights	Liberty Heights, 17 New Wakefield Street, Wakefield Street Tower, Student Castle	Student accommodation	Manchester	Greater Manchester	City of Manchester	Oxford Road		106	348	37	2012	
148=	One Crown Place North	One Crown Place Tower 1	Residential	London	City of London	–	Broadgate		106	348	30	2020	
148=	Ontario Tower	New Providence Wharf Building D1	Residential	London	Greater London	Tower Hamlets	Blackwall		106	348	31	2006	
148=	Sky Plaza	The Plaza Tower	Student accommodation	Leeds	West Yorkshire	City of Leeds	Arena Quarter		106	348	37	2008	
153=	33 Canada Square	Canary Wharf DS6, Citigroup Centre 1	Office	London	Greater London	Tower Hamlets	Canary Wharf		105	344	18	1999	
153=	Exchange Point	Lewisham Exchange Block B	Student accommodation / Residential	London	Greater London	Lewisham	Lewisham		105	344	35	2021	
155=	30 Casson Square	Thirty Casson Square, Shell Centre B4B	Residential	London	Greater London	Lambeth	South Bank		105	343	30	2019	
155=	Imperial West Tower	Imperial College West Residential Building, White City Campus Block F, 88 Wood Lane	Residential	London	Greater London	Hammersmith and Fulham	White City		105	343	35	2018	
155=	Pioneer Point North Tower	Pioneer Point Tower 2	Residential	London	Greater London	Redbridge	Ilford		105	343	31	2011	
155=	Victoria Square Tower 2		Residential	Woking	Surrey	–	Town Centre		105	343	30	2022	
159	99 Bishopsgate	HSBC City Tower	Office	London	City of London	–	Financial District		104	341	26	1976/1995	
160=	125 Old Broad Street	Stock Exchange Tower	Office	London	City of London	–	Financial District		103	338	27	1970/2008	
160=	Cherry Park Building A3		Residential	London	Greater London	Newham	Stratford		103	338	30	2022	
160=	Hightail	East Village Plot N06 Tower 1, Portlands Place Hightail Tower	Residential	London	Greater London	Newham	Stratford		103	338	29	2021	
160=	Legacy Tower	Stratford Central Legacy Tower, Angel Lane	Residential	London	Greater London	Newham	Stratford		103	338	33	2018	
164=	The Bank, Tower 2	Bank II	Residential	Birmingham	West Midlands	City of Birmingham	Westside		102	334	33	2019	
164=	The Highwood	Hurlock Heights, The Highwood West Grove, Elephant Park Plot H2c	Residential	London	Greater London	Southwark	Elephant and Castle		102	334	31	2019	
164=	No. 5 Upper Riverside	Greenwich Peninsula Sites N0205/6/7, Upper Riverside Building 5	Residential	London	Greater London	Greenwich	Greenwich Peninsula		102	334	31	2020	
164=	Sussex Heights		Residential	Brighton and Hove	East Sussex	Brighton	City Centre		102	334	24	1968	
168	Westmark Tower	West End Gate Tower A, West End Green Tower	Residential	London	Greater London	City of Westminster	Marylebone		102	333	30	2021	
169	Eda	Anchorage Gateway	Residential	Salford	Greater Manchester	City of Salford	Salford Quays		101	333	29	2023	
170	Goodluck Hope Douglass Tower	Goodluck Hope Tower 1, Leamouth Peninsula South Building B	Residential	London	Greater London	Tower Hamlets	Blackwall		101	332	30	2022	
171=	London Hilton on Park Lane	22 Park Lane	Hotel	London	Greater London	City of Westminster	Mayfair		101	331	29	1963	
171=	Angel Court	Angel Court Tower, One Angel Court	Office	London	City of London	–	Financial District		101	331	21	1979/2016	
171=	Portland House*		Office	London	Greater London	City of Westminster	Victoria		101	331	29	1963	*Under Redevelopment
171=	Woodberry Down Skyline	Skyline Apartments	Residential	London	Greater London	Hackney	Woodberry Down		101	331	31	2016	
171=	St Paul's Tower		Residential	Sheffield	South Yorkshire	City of Sheffield	City Centre		101	331	32	2010	
176=	Alpha Tower		Office	Birmingham	West Midlands	City of Birmingham	Westside		100	328	28	1972	
176=	Four Casson Square		Residential	London	Greater London	Lambeth	South Bank		100	328	29	2018	
176=	One Port Street		Residential	Manchester	Greater Manchester	City of Manchester	Piccadilly		100	328	33	2025	
176=	Jackson House	44 Merrion Street	Student accommodation	Leeds	West Yorkshire	Leeds City Region	Leeds City Centre		100	328	33	2023	
176=	Laurel Point	East Village Plot N08 Tower 2, Victory Plaza Laurel Point	Residential	London	Greater London	Newham	Stratford		100	328	29	2021	
176=	Crown Place	75–79 Lancaster Street	Student accommodation	Birmingham	West Midlands	City of Birmingham	Gun Quarter		100	328	32	2025	

=== Tallest buildings under construction ===
This list ranks all under-construction buildings in the UK that will stand at least 100 metres (330 ft) tall. This includes spires and architectural details but does not include antenna masts.

Updated 11 November 2025

Rank	Name	Alternative names	Function	City	County	Borough	Location	Height (m)	Height (ft)	Floors	Estimated Completion	Notes
1	Nobu Hotel & Residences	Viadux 2	Residential/Hotel/Retail	Manchester	Greater Manchester	City of Manchester	Central Business District	246	807	76	2031	
2	40 Charter Street	Wood Wharf E3/E4	Residential / Retail	London	Greater London	Tower Hamlets	Canary Wharf	187	614	53	2027	
3	Opus	Bankside Yards West Tower B, Ludgate House Tower B	Residential	London	Greater London	Southwark	Bankside	166	545	50	2027	
4	50 Charter Street, Tower 2	Wood Wharf J3	Residential	London	Greater London	Tower Hamlets	Canary Wharf	161	528	49	2027	
5	2 Finsbury Avenue East Tower		Office	London	City of London	–	Broadgate	156	511	38	2027	
6=	Contour Tower 1		Residential	Manchester	Greater Manchester	City of Manchester	Castlefield	154	505	51	2026	
6=	Contour Tower 2		Residential	Manchester	Greater Manchester	City of Manchester	Castlefield	154	505	51	2026	
8	50 Fenchurch Street		Office	London	City of London	–	Financial District	150	491	36	2027	
9	Centenary Tower	Edition, Brindley Drive	Residential	Birmingham	West Midlands	City of Birmingham	Paradise	148	486	46	2028	
10	St Michael's Tower 1	W Hotel & Residences	Mixed-use	Manchester	Greater Manchester	City of Manchester	Central Business District	144	443	44	2027	
11	Bermondsey Place	The Marker; Malt Street Block B4	Residential	London	Greater London	Southwark	Old Kent Road	143	470	44	2028	
12	Millharbour West G3	Millharbour Village G3	Residential / Retail	London	Greater London	Tower Hamlets	Isle of Dogs	142	467	43	On hold	
13	2 Trafalgar Way Building 2		Mixed-use	London	Greater London	Tower Hamlets	Poplar	138	452	46	2026	
14	Cirrus Point	Arena Point	Student accommodation	Leeds	West Yorkshire	City of Leeds	Arena Quarter	134	440	45	2026	
15	Capital House	Chapter London Bridge	Student accommodation	London	Greater London	Southwark	South Bank	133	438	39	2026	
16	Millharbour West G2.1	Millharbour Village G2.1	Residential	London	Greater London	Tower Hamlets	Isle of Dogs	126	413	39	On hold	
17	Heart of Hale Building 1	Ferry Island North Tower, Tottenham Hale Redevelopment Building 1	Residential	London	Greater London	Haringey	Tottenham Hale	~125	~410	38	2026	
18	Glasswater Locks		Residential	Birmingham	West Midlands	City of Birmingham	Eastside	124	407	38	2026	
19	Elephant Town Centre E2 Tower 1		Residential / Retail	London	Greater London	Southwark	Elephant and Castle	121	397	32	2027	
20	The Portal		Residential	London	Greater London	Ealing	North Acton	119	391	36	2026	
21=	Elephant Town Centre E2 Tower 3		Residential	London	Greater London	Southwark	Elephant and Castle	117	384	34	2028	
21=	One Medlock Street Tower 1		Student accommodation	Manchester	Greater Manchester	City of Manchester	Castlefield	117	384	38	2028	
23	Stratford Assembly		Student accommodation	London	Greater London	Newham	Stratford	115	378	36	2026	
24	The Ard	Portcullis House	Mixed-use	Glasgow	Greater Glasgow	City of Glasgow	Anderston	114	354	36	2028	
25	Millharbour West G2.2	Millharbour Village G2.2	Residential	London	Greater London	Tower Hamlets	Isle of Dogs	113	371	35	On hold	
26	Red Bank Riverside Tower 1	Dulwich Street Tower 1	Residential	Manchester	Greater Manchester	City of Manchester	Green Quarter	111	364	34	2028	
27	2 Trafalgar Way Building 3		Mixed-use	London	Greater London	Tower Hamlets	Poplar	110	361	36	2026	
28	X1 Michigan Tower 2		Residential	Salford	Greater Manchester	City of Salford	Salford Quays	109	358	35	2026	
29	The Castle		Residential	London	Greater London	Ealing	North Acton	106	348	32	2026	
30	Sky Gardens	Midland Mills	Residential / Office	Leeds	West Yorkshire	City of Leeds	Holbeck Urban Village	105	344	32	2028	
31	The Bellamy		Residential	London	Greater London	Tower Hamlets	Isle of Dogs	104	341	31	2027	
32	Millharbour West G4	Millharbour Village G4	Residential	London	Greater London	Tower Hamlets	Isle of Dogs	102	335	32	On hold	
33=	Centre House North Building, Centre House	Imperial College White City Campus Gateway; UGLI Campus Redevelopment	Student accommodation	London	Greater London	Hammersmith and Fulham	White City	102	334	32	2027	
33=	EDGE London Bridge	New City Court	Office	London	Greater London	Southwark	South Bank	102	334	27	2026	
33=	Upper Trinity Street		Mixed-use	Birmingham	West Midlands	City of Birmingham	Digbeth	102	334	32	2028	
36	CODE Sheffield	Wellington Street	Residential	Sheffield	South Yorkshire	City of Sheffield	Heart of the City	100	328	32	2027	

=== Tallest approved buildings ===
This list ranks all approved for construction buildings in the UK that will stand at least 100 metres (330 ft) tall. This includes spires and architectural details but does not include antenna masts.

Rank	Name	Alternative names	Function	City	County	Borough	Location	Height (m)	Height (ft)	Floors	Year Approved	Notes
1	1 Undershaft	"The Trellis" (formerly)	Office	London	City of London	–	Financial District	294	965	74	2024	
2	55 Bishopsgate		Office	London	City of London	–	Financial District	269	882	63	2023	
3	100 Leadenhall Street	The Diamond; Cheesegrater 2	Mixed-use	London	City of London	–	Financial District	247	810	56	2018	
4	Ensign House		Mixed-use	London	Greater London	Tower Hamlets	Canary Wharf	225	738	56	2022	
5	Plot D	The Lighthouse	Residential	Manchester	Greater Manchester	City of Manchester	Castlefield	213	698	71	2024	
6	One Portal Way Building A		Residential	London	Greater London	Ealing	North Acton	195	641	56	2024	
7	18 Blackfriars Road Office Tower		Office	London	Greater London	Southwark	South Bank	191	627	48	2024	
8	Vauxhall Cross Island South Tower	Vauxhall Cross Island South	Mixed-use	London	Greater London	Wandsworth	Vauxhall	186	609	54	2020	
9	5 Central Square	Plots 4 and 5 Central Square	Residential	Cardiff	Cardiff Capital Region	City of Cardiff	Cardiff City Centre	178	584	-	2025	
10	One Heritage		Residential	Salford	Greater Manchester	City of Salford	Greengate	173	568	55	2020	
11=	25 Cuba		Residential	London	Greater London	Tower Hamlets	Canary Wharf	172	564	52	2022	
11=	Boulton Tower	Curzon Wharf Tower 1	Residential	Birmingham	West Midlands	City of Birmingham	Eastside	172	564	53	2022	
12	Ruby Triangle Tower B	The Ruby Tower B	Residential	London	Greater London	Southwark	Old Kent Road	169	553	48	2018	
13	Student Castle Tower		Student accommodation	Manchester	Greater Manchester	City of Manchester	City Centre	168	551	55	2021	
14	Skylines Building C	Project Skylines Tower	Hotel / Residential	London	Greater London	Tower Hamlets	Isle of Dogs	162	531	49	2019	
15	Ten Bank Street	10 Bank Street; Heron Quays West 1	Office	London	Greater London	Tower Hamlets	Canary Wharf	161	528	31	2017	
16=	2 Humphrey Street	Southernwood Retail Park Block 1A	Mixed-use	London	Greater London	Southwark	Old Kent Road	159	522	48	2019	
16=	520 Old Kent Road Block C1	Cantium Retail Park Block C1	Residential	London	Greater London	Southwark	Old Kent Road	159	522	48	2019	
17	Cotton Quay Tower 1		Residential	Salford	Greater Manchester	City of Salford	Salford Quays	158	518	48	2020	
18	No. 10 Thames City	Nine Elms Square Tower N10; New Covent Garden Markets N10	Residential	London	Greater London	Wandsworth	Nine Elms	157	515	47	On Hold	
19	30 Marsh Wall	Student accommodation	Mixed-use	London	Greater London	Tower Hamlets	Isle of Dogs	156	512	48	2022	
20=	Plot C Crown Street Tower 1	The Green	Residential	Manchester	Greater Manchester	City of Manchester	Castlefield	154	505	52	2024	
20=	Plot C Crown Street Tower 2	The Green	Residential	Manchester	Greater Manchester	City of Manchester	Castlefield	154	505	52	2024	
21	99 City Road		Office	London	Greater London	Hackney	Shoreditch	152	499	35	2023	
22=	2 Snowhill Plaza	HUB	Residential	Birmingham	West Midlands	City of Birmingham	City Core	151	495	48	2023	
22=	SBQ 3	Smallbrook Queensway 3	Residential	Birmingham	West Midlands	City of Birmingham	Southside	151	495	48	2024	
22=	Vauxhall Cross Island North Tower	Vauxhall Cross Island South	Mixed-use	London	Greater London	Wandsworth	Vauxhall	151	495	42	2020	
22=	18 Blackfriars Road Stamford Building		Residential	London	Greater London	Southwark	South Bank	151	495	44	2024	
23	7 Brannan Street	Wood Wharf F1	Student accommodation	London	Greater London	Tower Hamlets	Canary Wharf	150	491	46	2022	
24	The Essington	Glassworks, 90-97 Broad Street	Mixed-use	Birmingham	West Midlands	City of Birmingham	Westside	148	486	47	2024	
25=	56–58 Marsh Wall		Residential	London	Greater London	Tower Hamlets	Isle of Dogs	147	428	46	2023	
25=	1 Bridge Street Tower 1		Residential	Manchester	Greater Manchester	City of Manchester	Spinningfields	147	482	45	2023	
26=	Tower Leaf	Irish Centre Tower	Residential	Birmingham	West Midlands	City of Birmingham	Digbeth	146	478	48	2020	
26=	Vista River Gardens Tower 3		Residential	Manchester	Greater Manchester	City of Manchester	Castlefield	146	479	48	2022	
27=	Ruby Triangle Tower C1	The Ruby Tower C1	Residential	London	Greater London	Southwark	Old Kent Road	142	466	41	2018	
27=	Stratford Yards North Tower	Stratford Central & The Yards Tower, Great Eastern Road Tower	Residential	London	Greater London	Newham	Stratford	142	466	43	2016	
28=	54 Marsh Wall		Residential / Retail	London	Greater London	Tower Hamlets	Isle of Dogs	140	459	42	2018	
28=	596-608 Old Kent Road	Peckham Place Road Tower	Residential	London	Greater London	Southwark	Old Kent Road	140	458	38	2019	
28=	One Station Road	One Station Square	Residential	London	Greater London	Redbridge	Ilford	140	459	43	2019	
29=	Plot C Crown Street Tower 3	The Green	Residential	Manchester	Greater Manchester	City of Manchester	Castlefield	139	456	47	2024	
29=	Plot C Crown Street Tower 4	The Green	Residential	Manchester	Greater Manchester	City of Manchester	Castlefield	139	456	47	2024	
30=	West End Gate Phase 2	Paddington Green Police Station	Residential	London	Greater London	City of Westminster	Paddington	138	453	39	2023	
30=	85 Gracechurch Street		Mixed-use	London	City of London	–	Financial District	138	453	32	2023	
31	East Village Plot N18		Residential	London	Greater London	Newham	Stratford	135	443	36	2014	
32	Watt Tower	Curzon Wharf Tower 2	Residential	Birmingham	West Midlands	City of Birmingham	Eastside	134	440	41	2024	
33	Trifecta Residences		Residential	Birmingham	West Midlands	City of Birmingham	Southside	133	436	40	2024	
34=	Blackwall Yards Plot 1 Building 1.1		Residential	London	Greater London	Tower Hamlets	Blackwall	132	433	40	2024	
34=	Custom House Street Tower		Residential	Cardiff	City and County of Cardiff	–	City Centre	132	433	42	On hold	
35	Meridian Square	Meridian steps tower	Student accommodation	London	Greater London	Newham	Stratford	131	430	41	2024	
36	55 Gracechurch Street		Office	London	City of London	–	Financial District	130	427	30	On hold	
37=	Bishopsgate Goodsyard Plot 2	The Goodsyard Office Tower	Office	London	Greater London	Hackney/Tower Hamlets	Shoreditch	128	420	29	2020	
37=	The Peak	Angel Meadow Park Block 4	Residential	Manchester	Greater Manchester	City of Manchester	NOMA	128	410	41	2017	
38	X1 Michigan Towers 4		Residential	Salford	Greater Manchester	City of Salford	Salford Quays	127	417	41	2026	
39	Wellington Street Block A	former Yorkshire Post Site Block A	Student accommodation	Leeds	West Yorkshire	City of Leeds	Holbeck Urban Village	126	413	42	2023	
40=	Canada Water Plot F Tower 1		Office / Residential	London	Greater London	Southwark	Surrey Quays	125	410	36	2022	
40=	Chapel Place Block 1		Residential	London	Greater London	Redbridge	Ilford	125	410	38	2024	
40=	One Waterloo	Elizabeth House	Office	London	Greater London	Lambeth	Waterloo	125	410	31	2021	
41=	520 Old Kent Road Block B1	Cantium Retail Park Block B1	Residential	London	Greater London	Southwark	Old Kent Road	124	407	37	2019	
41=	Botanical House Tower 1	Croydon Park Hotel Redevelopment Tower 1	Residential	London	Greater London	Croydon	East Croydon	124	407	36	2024	
42=	Parkside		Residential	Manchester	Greater Manchester	City of Salford	Greengate	123	404	42	2020	
42=	Cotton Quay Tower 2	Salford Quays Tower 2	Residential	Manchester	Greater Manchester	City of Salford	Salford Quays	123	404	37	2020	
42=	Prestage Place	Blackwall Reach Phase 4A, Block K	Residential	London	Greater London	Tower Hamlets	Blackwall	123	404	38	2024	
43=	Garrison Circus Block D		Residential	Birmingham	West Midlands	City of Birmingham	Digbeth	122	400	37	2024	
43=	Morden Wharf TO2		Residential	London	Greater London	Greenwich	Greenwich Peninsula	122	400	36	2022	
44	Kings Road Park H2	Fulham Gasworks Phase 5	Residential	London	Greater London	Hammersmith and Fulham	Fulham	121	397	38	2024	
45=	International Quarter London (IQL) South, Plot S1		Mixed-use	London	Greater London	Newham	Stratford	120	354	35	2022	
45=	Kings Tower		Residential	Sheffield	South Yorkshire	City of Sheffield	Castlegate Quarter	120	394	40	2020	
45=	Vista River Gardens Tower 4		Residential	Manchester	Greater Manchester	City of Manchester	Castlefield	120	394	39	2022	
46	East Village Plot N19		Residential	London	Greater London	Newham	Stratford	119	391	36	2014	
47	Mondial Tower	Mondial House redevelopment 102 George Street	Mixed-use	London	Greater London	Croydon	East Croydon	118	387	34	2016	
46=	211 Broad Street	Super Slender Tower	Aparthotel	Birmingham	West Midlands	City of Birmingham	Westside	117	384	37	2020	
48=	Downing Living Tower 1	Clay Pit Lane Tower 1	Student accommodation	Leeds	West Yorkshire	City of Leeds	Leeds City Centre	117	384	38	2023	
48=	Northumberland Development Project Hotel	Tottenham Hotspur Stadium Hotel	Hotel	London	Greater London	Haringey	Tottenham Hale	117	384	31	2024	
48=	Ram Brewery Tower	Ram Quarter Phase 2	Residential	London	Greater London	Wandsworth	Wandsworth Town Centre	117	385	36	2013	
49=	Canada Water Plot F Tower 2		Residential	London	Greater London	Southwark	Surrey Quays	116	381	33	2022	
49=	Convoys Wharf Tower 1		Residential	London	Greater London	Lewisham	Deptford	116	381	40	2020	
49=	Hotspur Yard		Residential	Manchester	Greater Manchester	City of Manchester	Manchester city centre	116	380	39	2018	
50=	Burlington Tower	South Quay Plaza Tower 2, Berwick Tower	Residential	London	Greater London	Tower Hamlets	Isle of Dogs	115	377	36	2021	
50=	Deptford Landings Plot 1	Timberyard Deptford Plot 1	Residential	London	Greater London	Lewisham	Deptford	115	377	35	2023	
50=	One Peninsula Square	Plot N0201 Greenwich Peninsula	Student accommodation	London	Greater London	Greenwich	Greenwich Peninsula	115	378	36	2024	
51=	Stonebridge Place		Residential	London	Greater London	Brent	Wembley	114	374	35	2023	
51=	Blackwall Yards Plot 1 Building 1.2		Residential	London	Greater London	Tower Hamlets	Blackwall	114	374	34	2024	
52	Devonshire Place Building A	Devonshire Square Tower 1	Residential	London	Greater London	Southwark	Old Kent Road	113	371	34	2024	
53=	Botanical House Tower 2	Croydon Park Hotel Redevelopment Tower 2	Residential	London	Greater London	Croydon	East Croydon	112	368	33	2024	
53=	Great Northern Warehouse Tower 1		Residential	Manchester	Greater Manchester	City of Manchester	Manchester city centre	112	367	36	2024	
54	Meridian Water Plot D		Residential	London	Greater London	Enfield	Enfield	111	364	30	2023	
55=	Cambrian Wharf Canalside Block A		Student accommodation	Birmingham	West Midlands	City of Birmingham	Westside	110	361	34	2024	
55=	Republic Masterplan Plot 2		Student accommodation	London	Greater London	Tower Hamlets	Blackwall	110	361	36	2023	
56	High Street/Clyde Street Bordesley	former Safestyle building	Residential	Birmingham	West Midlands	City of Birmingham	Digbeth	108	354	34	2023	
57=	The Gasworks		Residential	Manchester	Greater Manchester	City of Manchester	NOMA	107	351	35	2021	
57=	Ruby Triangle Tower C2	The Ruby Tower C2	Residential	London	Greater London	Southwark	Old Kent Road	107	349	31	2018	
57=	Westferry Printworks		Residential	London	Greater London	Tower Hamlets	Limehouse	107	351	31	2024	
58=	Gateway Tower	Debenhams Tower	Residential	Bristol	City of Bristol	City of Bristol	The Bearpit	106	348	28	2024	
58=	The Village MK Gateway	MK Gateway Residential Tower, Saxon Court Redevelopment	Residential	Milton Keynes	Buckinghamshire	City of Milton Keynes	Central Milton Keynes	106	348	34	2022	
59=	72 Upper Ground	New London Television Centre, "The Slab"	Mixed-use	London	Greater London	Southwark	South Bank	105	344	22	2024	
59=	Lisbon Square Building 1 Tower 2	Lisbon Square Phase 2	Residential	Leeds	West Yorkshire	City of Leeds	Leeds City Centre	105	351	33	2022	
59=	Sylvan Grove	Sylvan Square, Daisy Business Park Redevelopment Tower	Residential	London	Greater London	Southwark	Old Kent Road	105	345	32	2022	
60=	4-20 Edridge Road	The Edridge Croydon Tower 1	Residential	London	Greater London	Croydon	Town Centre	104	341	33	2022	
60=	Canada Water Dockside A1		Office	London	Greater London	Southwark	Surrey Quays	104	341	25	2023	
61=	St James House		Residential	Bristol	City of Bristol	City of Bristol	The Bearpit	103	338	28	2025	
61=	Morden Wharf TO3		Residential	London	Greater London	Greenwich	Greenwich Peninsula	103	338	30	2022	
61=	The Hundred	100 Broad Street	Residential	Birmingham	West Midlands	City of Birmingham	Westside	103	338	32	2024	
61=	5-7 Park Royal Road		Residential	London	Greater London	Ealing	North Acton	103	337	33	2024	
61=	115-123 Houndsditch		Mixed-use	London	City of London	–	Financial District	103	337	24	2022	
61=	Bermondsey Project Building BF-S	Grosvenor Bermondsey; Tower Bridge Business Complex; The Biscuit Factory & Bermondsey Campus Site	Residential	London	Greater London	Southwark	Bermondsey	103	337	29	2024	
61=	Leon House Block A		Residential	London	Greater London	Croydon	South Croydon	103	337	31	2023	
62	The Goods Yard Block A	The Goods Yard & The Depot	Residential	London	Greater London	Haringey	Tottenham Hale	102	335	33	2024	
63=	Gateway East		Office	London	Greater London	Hammersmith & Fulham	White City	101	331	21	2017	
63=	Queens Hospital Tower		Mixed-use	Birmingham	West Midlands	City of Birmingham	Westside	101	331	33	2024	
63=	Middlewood Locks Phase 4 Tower 1		Residential	Manchester	Greater Manchester	City of Manchester	Ordsall	101	331	32	2023	
63=	The Gateway Building	Paddington Gateway	Mixed-use	London	Greater London	City of Westminster	Paddington	101	331	20	2017	
64=	Atlas Wharf		Residential	London	Greater London	Hammersmith and Fulham	Old Oak Common	100	328	30	2023	
64=	Bridge Street Building Z5	Integrated City Leeds	Residential	Leeds	West Yorkshire	City of Leeds	Sheepscar	100	328	31	2021	
64=	Bridge Street Building Z5	Integrated City Leeds	Residential	Leeds	West Yorkshire	City of Leeds	Sheepscar	100	328	31	2021	
64=	Colechurch House Redevelopment		Office	London	Greater London	Southwark	London Bridge	100	328	22	2022	

This list ranks all buildings in the UK with outline planning approval that will stand at least 100 metres (330 ft) tall. This includes spires and architectural details but does not include antenna masts.

Updated 4 September 2024

Rank	Name	Alternative names	Function	City	County	Borough	Location	Height (m)	Height (ft)	Floors	Year Approved	Notes
1	North Quay Tower NQ.A4		Residential	London	Greater London	Tower Hamlets	Canary Wharf	219	719	65	OUT/2022 (Site prep)	
2	One Portal Way Tower 2		Residential	London	Greater London	Ealing	North Acton	185	608	51	OUT/2024	
3	One Portal Way Tower 3		Residential	London	Greater London	Ealing	North Acton	182	595	51	OUT/2024	
–	Red Bank Tower 1		Residential	Manchester	Greater Manchester	City of Salford	Cheetham Hill	181	594	55	OUT/2023	
4	SBQ 2	Smallbrook Queensway 2	Residential	Birmingham	West Midlands	City of Birmingham	Southside	180	591	56	OUT/2024	
5	North Quay Tower NQ.D4		Serviced Apartments	London	Greater London	Tower Hamlets	Canary Wharf	178	604	53	OUT/2022 (Site prep)	
6	North Quay Tower NQ.B1		Office	London	Greater London	Tower Hamlets	Canary Wharf	174	571	–	OUT/2022 (Site prep)	
7	4 Charter Street	Wood Wharf B1	Office / Retail	London	Greater London	Tower Hamlets	Canary Wharf	151	495	37	OUT/2014	
8	South Village DZ1 Plot B	former City One regeneration scheme	Residential	Leeds	West Yorkshire	City of Leeds	Holbeck Urban Village	~146	~479	~40	OUT/2024	
9=	Canada Water Plot D Tower		Office / Residential	London	Greater London	Southwark	Surrey Quays	142	466	–	OUT/2020	
9=	SBQ 1	Smallbrook Queensway 1	Residential	Birmingham	West Midlands	City of Birmingham	Southside	142	466	44	OUT/2024	
11	Globe Waterside	CEG Southbank Tower	Residential	Leeds	West Yorkshire	City of Leeds	South Bank	138	452	40	OUT/2018	
12	North Quay Tower NQ.D1/D2		Office	London	Greater London	Tower Hamlets	Canary Wharf	133	436	32	OUT/2022 (Site prep)	
13	South Village DZ2 Plot D	former City One regeneration scheme	Residential, Office or Hotel	Leeds	West Yorkshire	City of Leeds	Holbeck Urban Village	~131	~430	~35	OUT/2024	
14	Vicarage Field Block B1	Barking Town Centre Redevelopment	Mixed-use	London	Greater London	Barking and Dagenham	Barking	130	427	36	OUT/2018	
15	Martineau Galleries Residential Tower		Residential	Birmingham	West Midlands	City of Birmingham	City Centre	126	413	36	OUT/2020	
16	North Quay Tower NQ.A1		Residential	London	Greater London	Tower Hamlets	Canary Wharf	125	410	36	OUT/2022 (Site prep)	
17	Blackwall Reach Building Parcel I	Blackwall Reach Phase 3	Residential / Retail	London	Greater London	Tower Hamlets	Blackwall	~124	~407	–	OUT/2012	
18	Parkside at Collier's Yard	Greengate Park North Phase 3, Plot C&D	Residential	Salford	Greater Manchester	City of Salford	Greengate	123	404	42	OUT/2020	
19	Aire Park	former Tetley's Brewery	Residential	Leeds	West Yorkshire	City of Leeds	South Bank	120	394	39	OUT/2018	
20	Canada Water Plot B Tower		Office / Residential	London	Greater London	Southwark	Surrey Quays	118	387	–	OUT/2020	
21	Westfield White City, Block 6		Residential	London	Greater London	Hammersmith and Fulham	White City	116	381	33	OUT/2024	
22	Bermondsey Place	Malt Street Block B	Residential	London	Greater London	Southwark	Old Kent Road	113	370	35	OUT/2020	
23	Cross Harbour District Centre, Building K		Residential	London	Greater London	Tower Hamlets	Isle of Dogs	111	364	32	OUT/2024	
24=	Blackwall Reach Building Parcel K	Blackwall Reach Phase 3	Residential / Retail	London	Greater London	Tower Hamlets	Blackwall	~109	~358	–	OUT/2012	
24=	Canada Water Plot G Tower 1		Office / Residential	London	Greater London	Southwark	Surrey Quays	109	358	–	OUT/2020	
26	Westfield White City, Block 4		Residential	London	Greater London	Hammersmith and Fulham	White City	105	345	30	OUT/2024	
27	Canada Water Plot C Tower		Residential	London	Greater London	Southwark	Surrey Quays	103	338	–	OUT/2020	
28	Edmonton Green Tower	Edmonton Green Shopping Centre Phase 3B, Plot 5	Residential	London	Greater London	Enfield	Edmonton Green	100	328	30	OUT/2022	

=== Tallest demolished buildings ===
This list ranks all demolished and destroyed buildings in the UK that stood at least 100 metres (330 ft) tall. This includes spires and architectural details but does not include antenna masts.

Rank	Name	Function	City	County	Borough	Location	Height (m)	Height (ft)	Floors	Year built	Year demolished
1=	Drapers' Gardens	Office	London	City of London	–	Financial District	100	328	30	1967	2007
1=	Southwark Towers	Office	London	Greater London	Southwark	London Bridge	100	328	25	1975	2008

== Timeline of tallest buildings ==
This list ranks the tallest storeyed buildings in the UK throughout history, excluding freestanding clock towers, church spires and similar structures.

Name	Alternative names	Function	City	County	Borough	Location	Image	Height (m)	Height (ft)	Floors	Years as tallest
Victoria Tower	Palace of Westminster; Houses of Parliament	Government building	London	Greater London	City of Westminster	Westminster		98.5	325	14	1860–1961 (102 years)
Shell Centre		Office	London	Greater London	Lambeth	South Bank		107	351	26	1961–1962 (1 year)
CIS Tower	Co-operative Insurance Tower	Office	Manchester	Greater Manchester	City of Manchester	NOMA		118	387	25	1962–1963 (1 year)
Millbank Tower	Vickers Building	Office	London	Greater London	City of Westminster	Millbank		118	390	32	1963–1964 (1 year)
BT Tower	GPO Tower; Post Office Tower; British Telecom Tower	Communications Tower	London	Greater London	Camden	Fitzrovia		177	581	36	1964–1977 (13 years)
Tower 42	NatWest Tower	Office	London	City of London	–	Financial District		183	600	47	1977–1990 (13 years)
One Canada Square	Canary Wharf DS2	Office	London	Greater London	Tower Hamlets	Canary Wharf		235	770	50	1990–2012 (22 years)
The Shard	The Shard of Glass; London Bridge Tower	Mixed-use	London	Greater London	Southwark	London Bridge		310	1,017	87	2012–present

== Tallest buildings by city ==
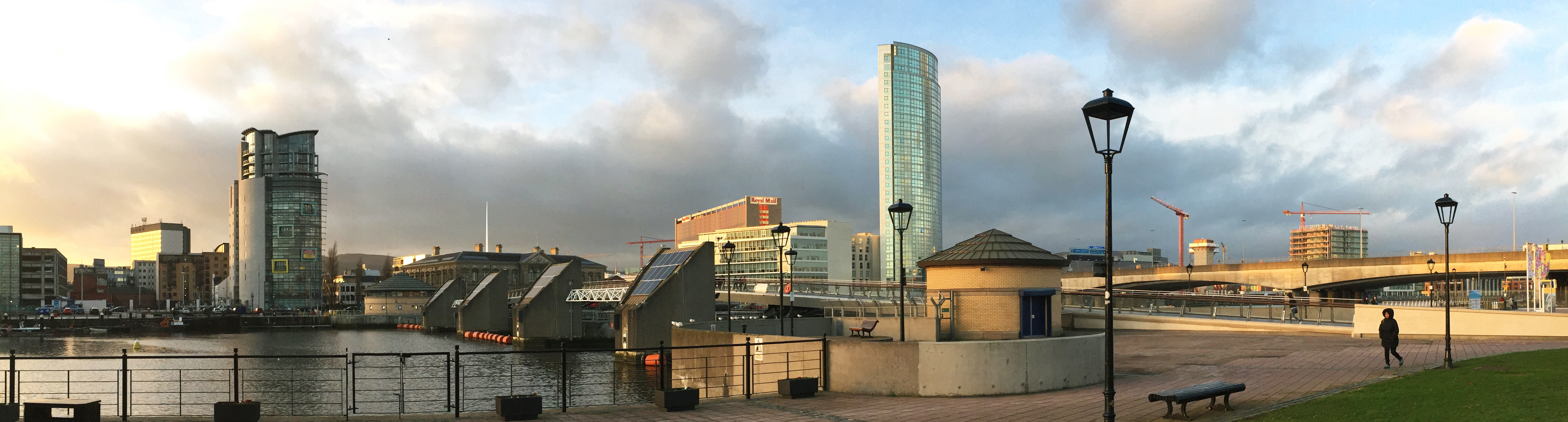
List of tallest buildings and structures in Belfast
(Three tallest buildings: Obel Tower 85m, Grand Central Hotel 80m, Belfast City Hospital Tower 76m)
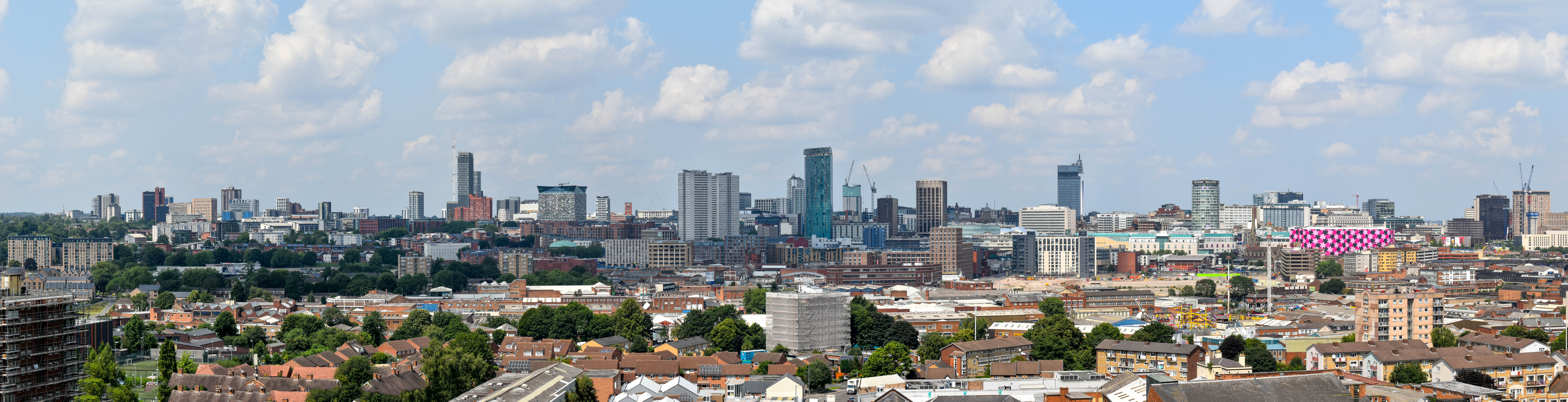
List of tallest buildings and structures in Birmingham
(Three tallest buildings: The Octagon 155m, One Eastside 155m, The Mercian 132m)
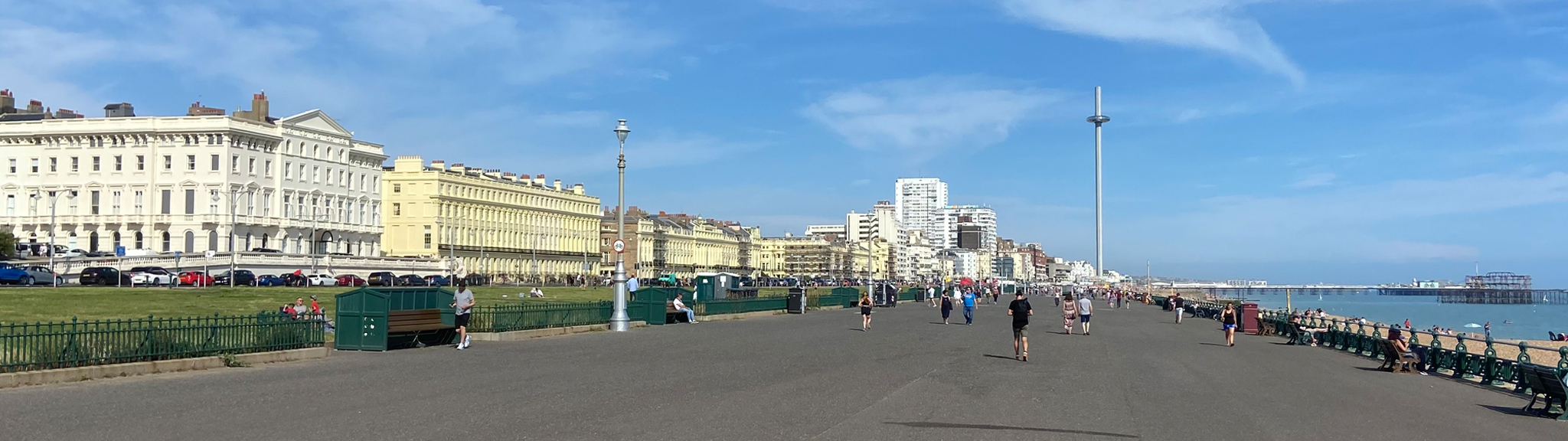
List of tallest buildings and structures in Brighton and Hove
(Three tallest buildings: Sussex Heights 102m, Thomas Kemp Tower 72m, Chartwell Court 66m)
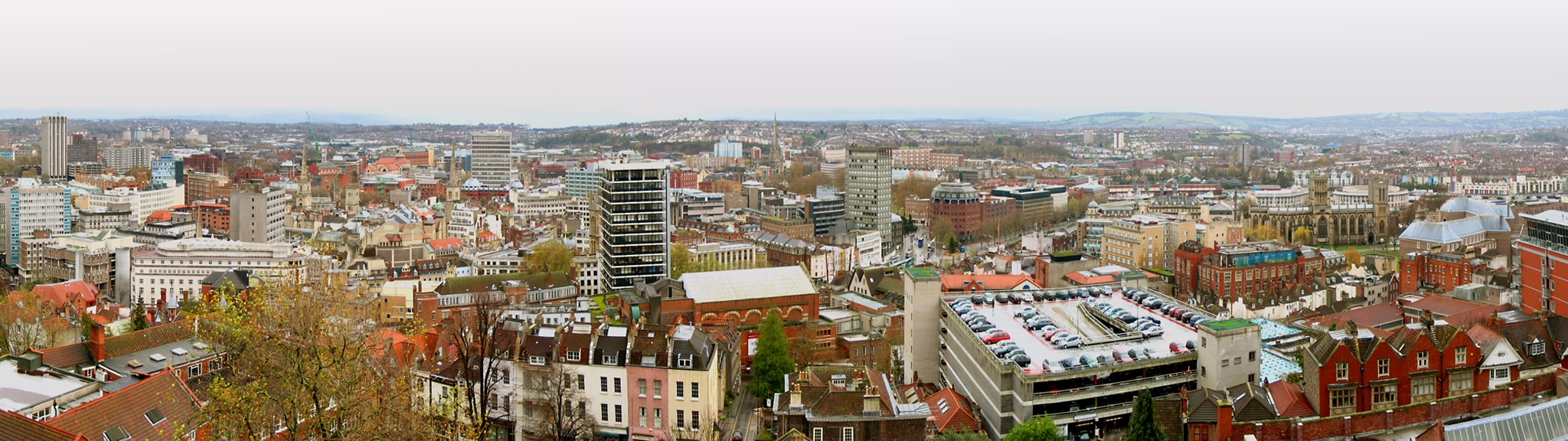
List of tallest buildings and structures in Bristol
(Three tallest buildings: Castle Park View 98m, Castlemead 80m, Redcliff Quarter 73m)
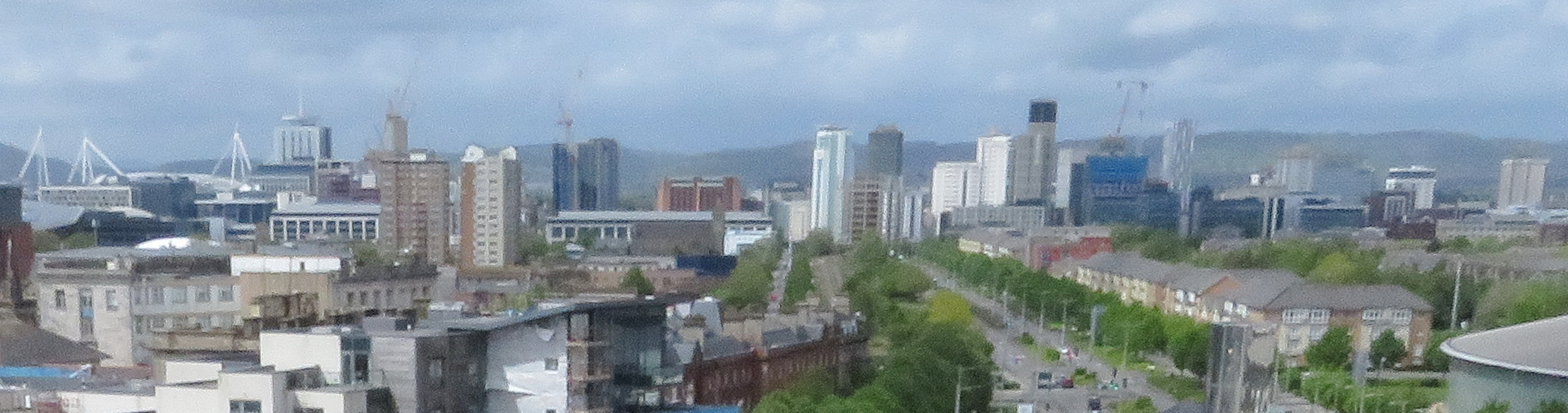
List of tallest buildings and structures in Cardiff
(Three tallest buildings: 1–6 Guildford Crescent 96m, Plot 1 90.5m, Bridge Street Exchange 85m)
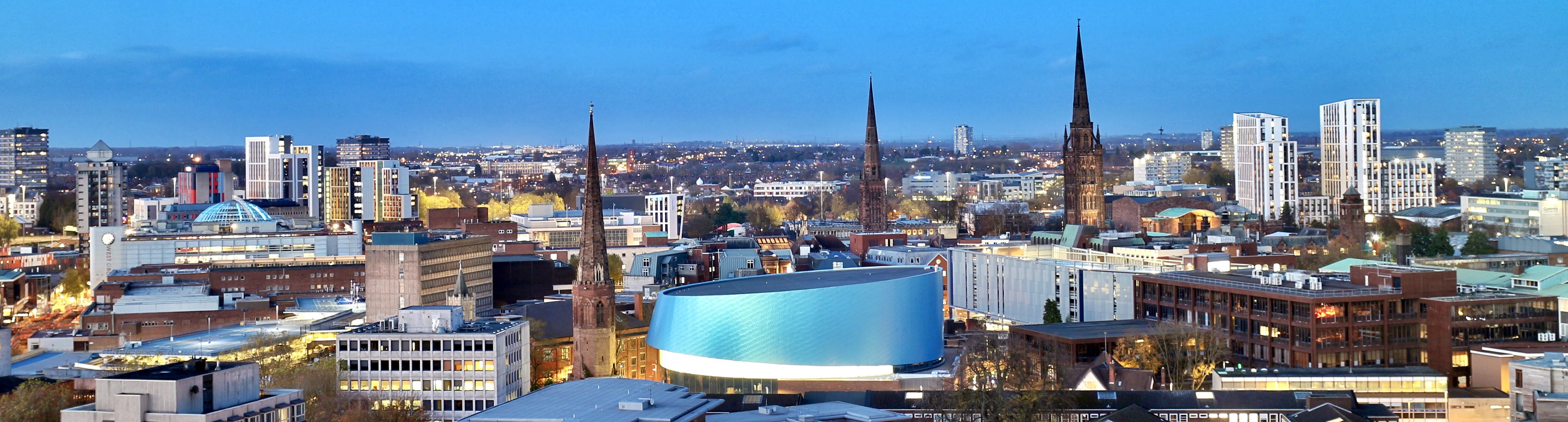
List of tallest buildings and structures in Coventry
(Three tallest buildings: CODE Coventry Block B 76m, CODE Coventry Block D 70m, Mercia House 68m)
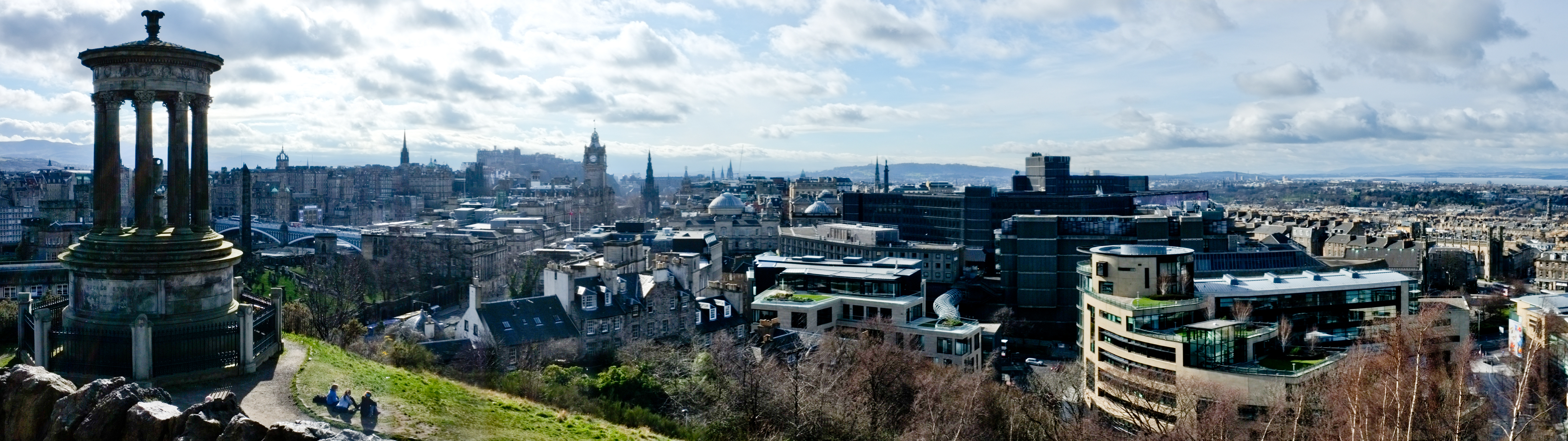
List of tallest buildings and structures in Edinburgh
(Three tallest buildings: Martello Court 64m, Fettes College 60m, Citadel Court 59m, Persevere Court 59m)
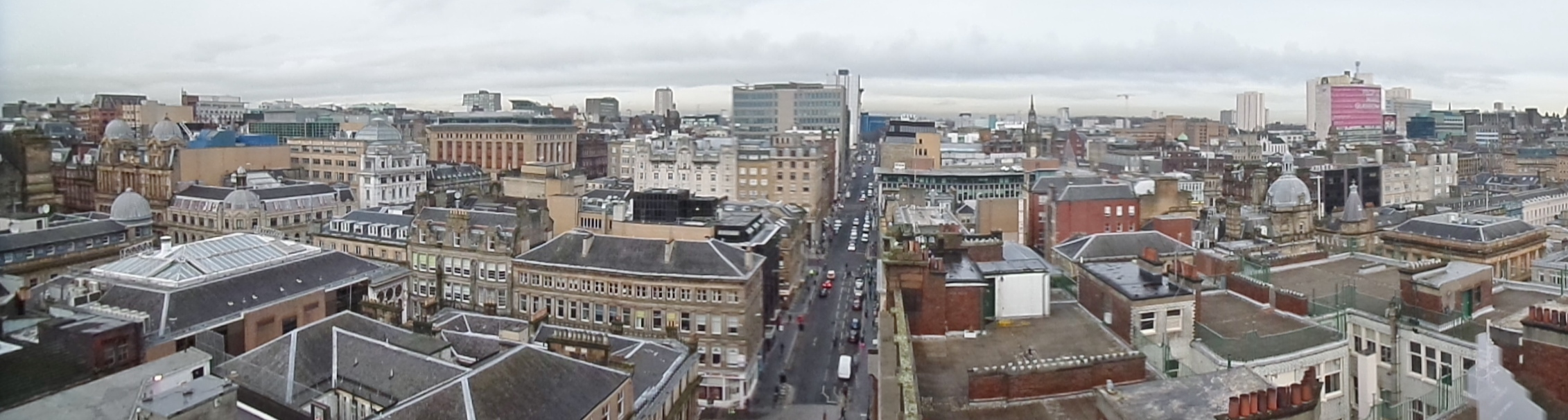
List of tallest buildings and structures in Glasgow
(Three tallest buildings: Glasgow University Tower 85m, Met Tower 75m, 22 Viewpoint Place 74m, 42 Viewpoint Place 74m, 15 Croftbank Street 74m, 250 Edgefauld Road 74m)
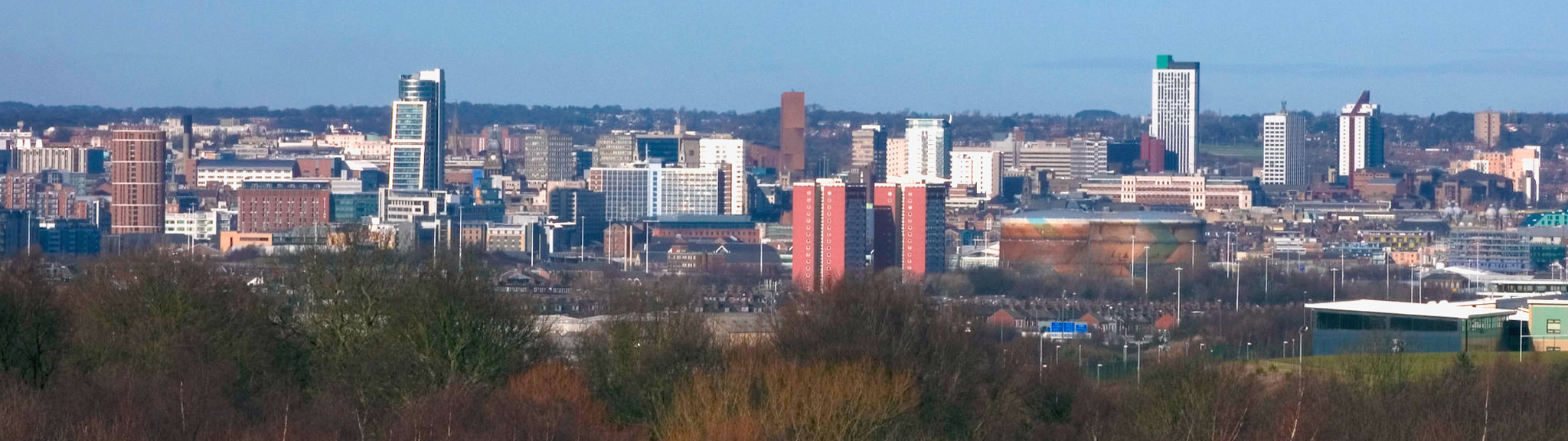
List of tallest buildings and structures in Leeds
(Three tallest buildings: Cirrus Point 134m, Altus House 114m, Bridgewater Place 112m)
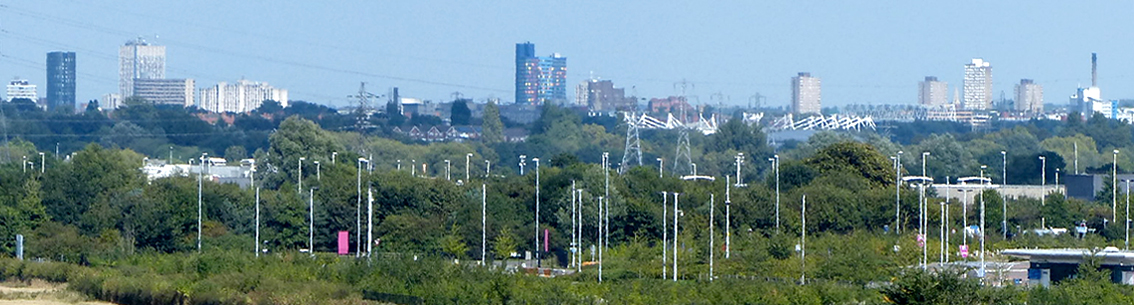
List of tallest buildings and structures in Leicester
(Three tallest buildings: Cardinal Telephone Exchange 84m, St George's Tower 82m, The Summit 67m)
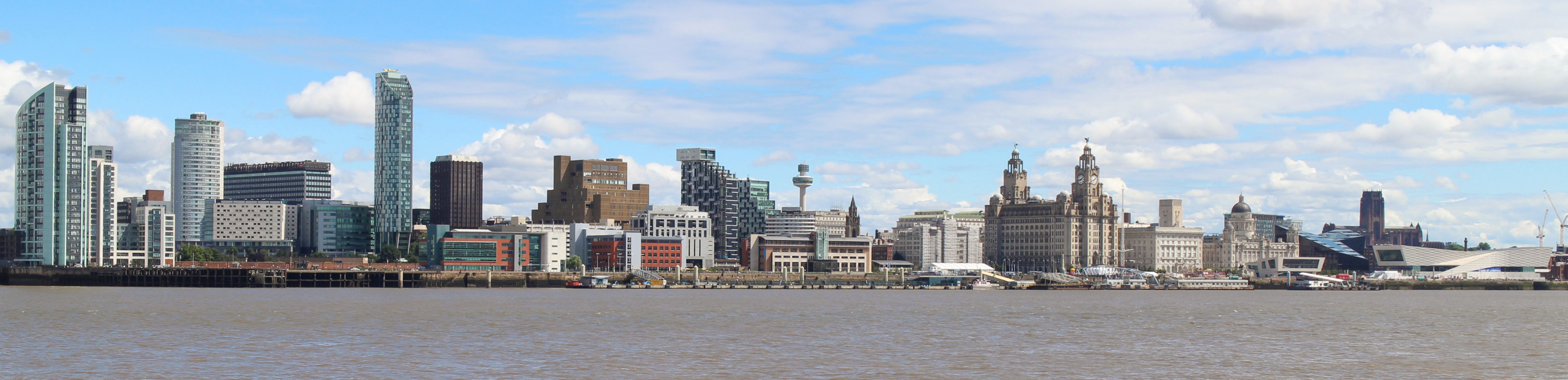
List of tallest buildings and structures in Liverpool
(Three tallest buildings: West Tower 140m, The Lexington 113m, Lighthaus 108m)
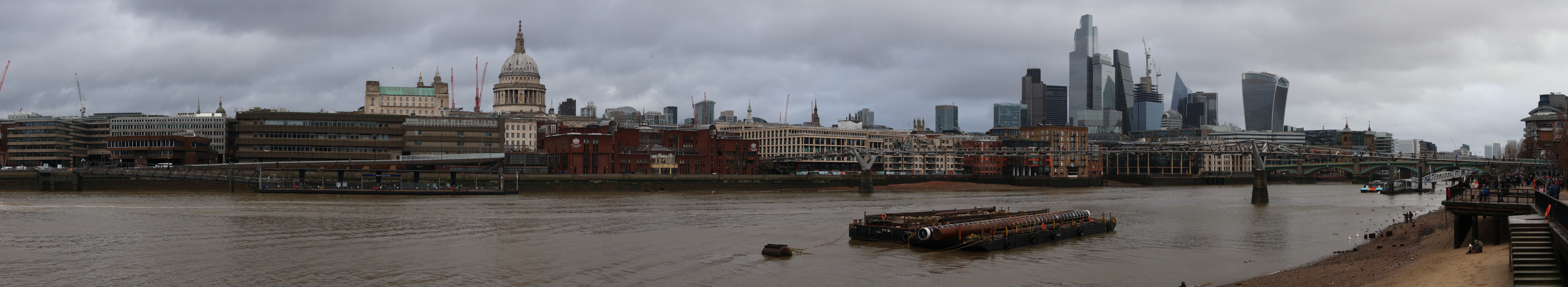
List of tallest buildings and structures in London
(Three tallest buildings: The Shard 310m, 22 Bishopsgate 278m, One Canada Square 235m)
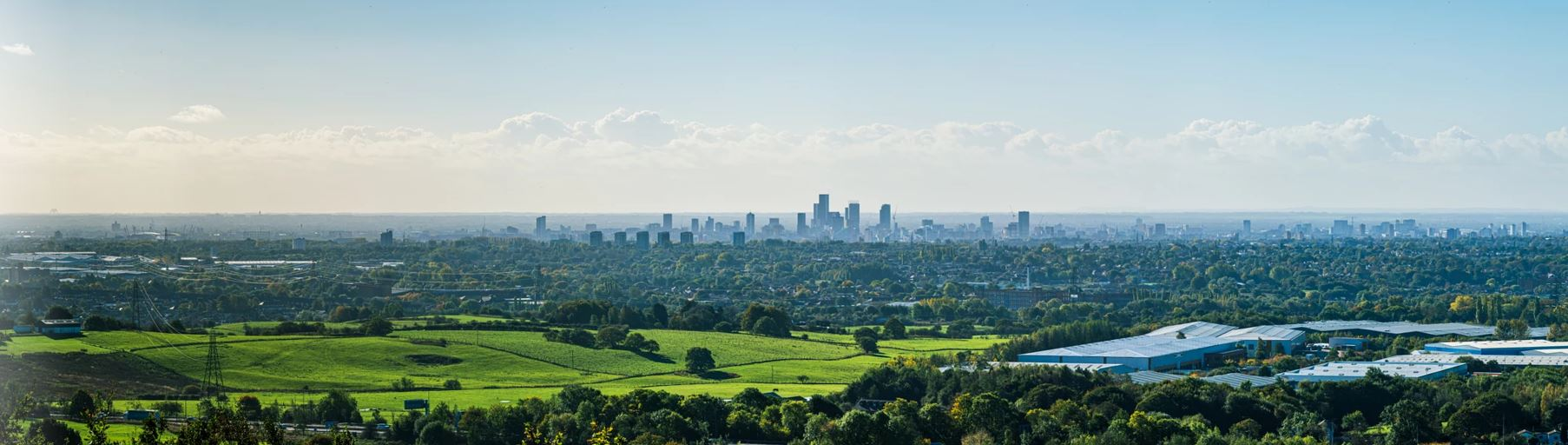
List of tallest buildings and structures in Manchester
(Three tallest buildings: Deansgate Square South Tower 201m, Trinity Heights 183m, Vista River Gardens 169m)
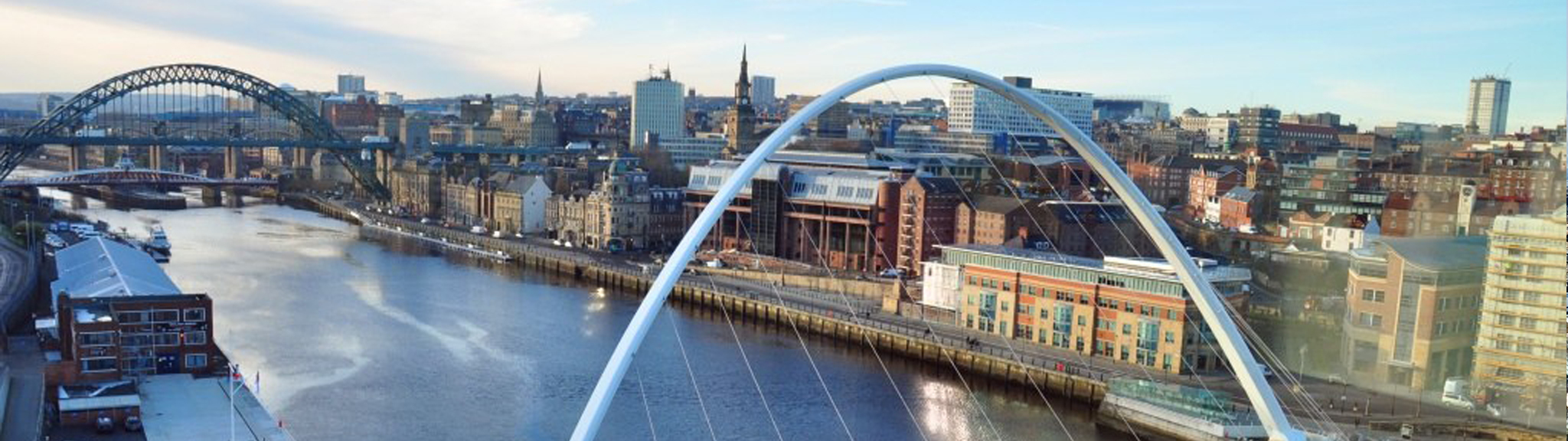
List of tallest buildings and structures in Newcastle upon Tyne
(Three tallest buildings: Hadrian's Tower 83m, Vale House 80m, Shieldfield House 77m)
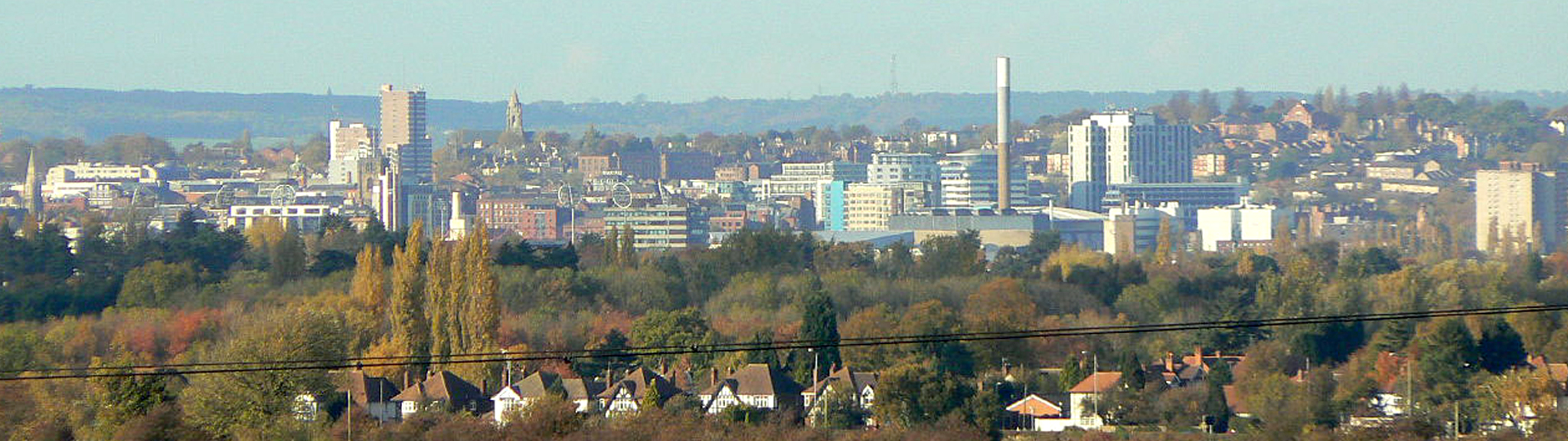
List of tallest buildings and structures in Nottingham
(Three tallest structures: Victoria Centre Flats A 75m, Pine View 62m, Bowman Telephone Exchange 61m)
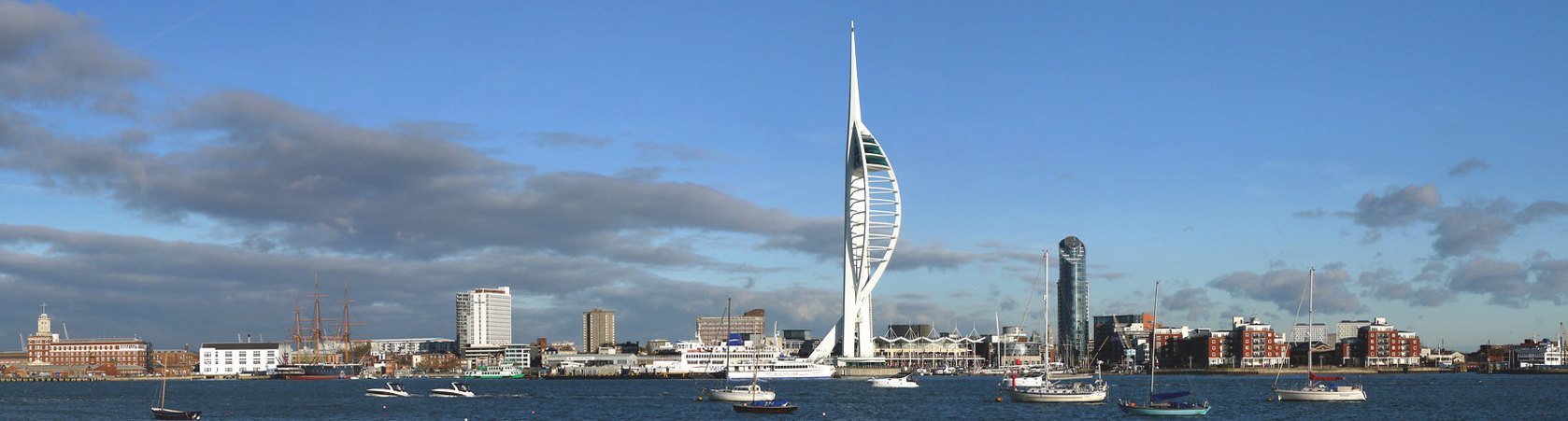
List of tallest buildings and structures in Portsmouth
(Three tallest buildings: Spinnaker Tower 170m, East Side Plaza 98m, Greetham Street 73m)
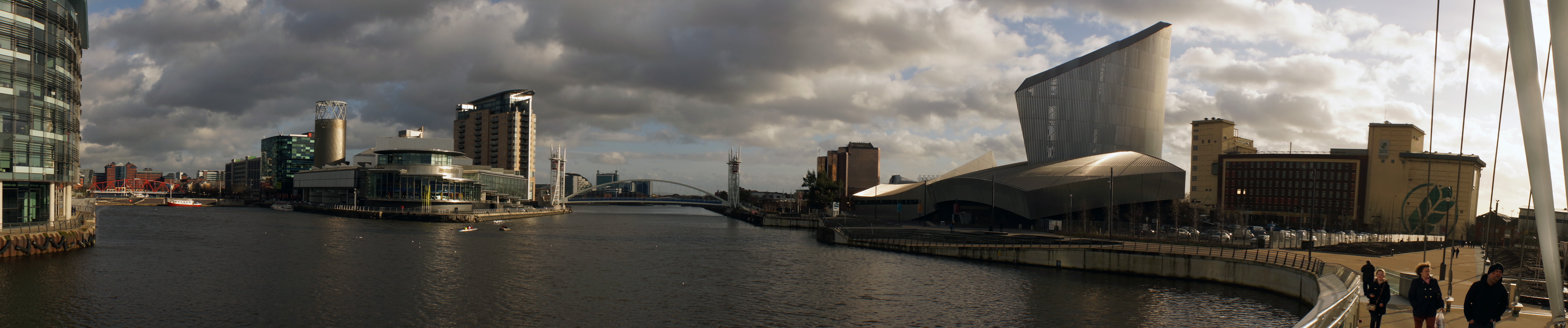
List of tallest buildings and structures in Salford
(Three tallest buildings: Cortland at Colliers Yard 153m, Anaconda Cut 131m, Bankside at Colliers Yard 129m)
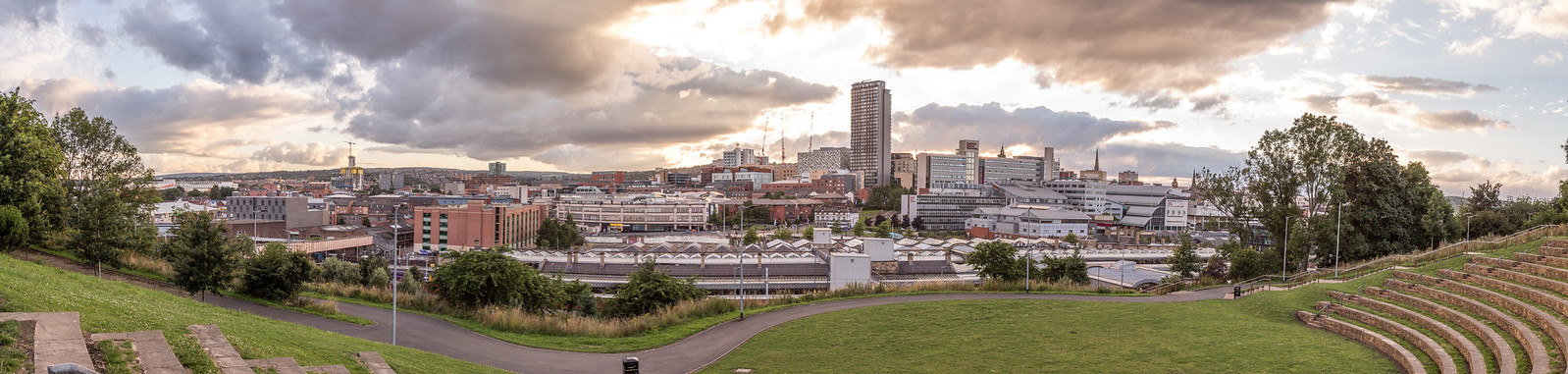
List of tallest buildings and structures in Sheffield
(Three tallest buildings: St Paul's Tower 101m, Calico Sheffield 85m, Arts Tower 78m)
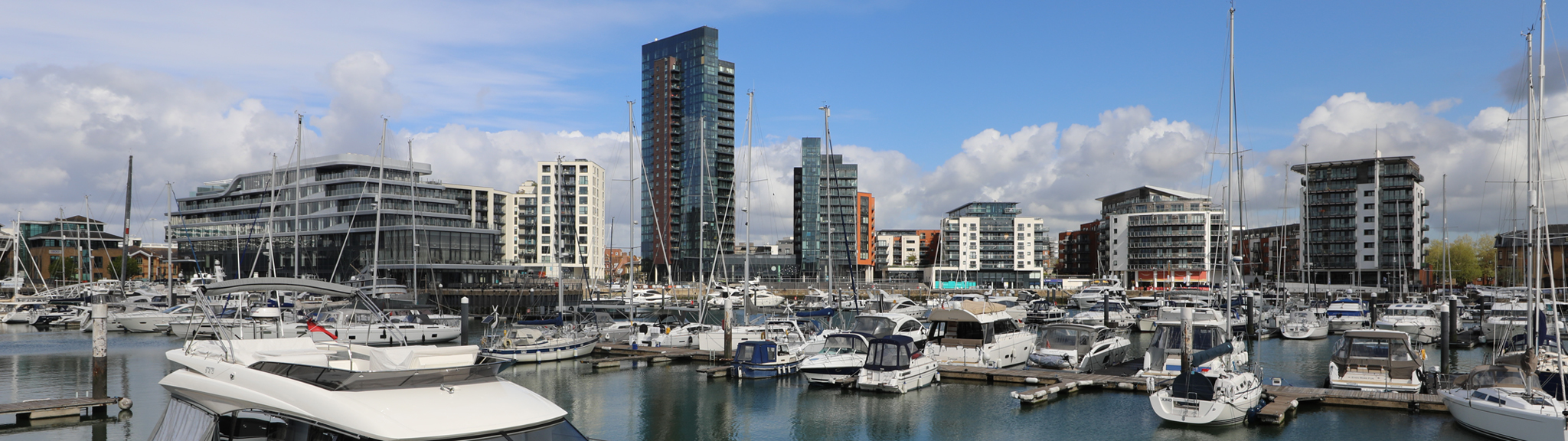
List of tallest buildings and structures in Southampton
(Three tallest buildings: Centenary Quay 85m, Moresby Tower 80m, Millbrook Tower 73m)
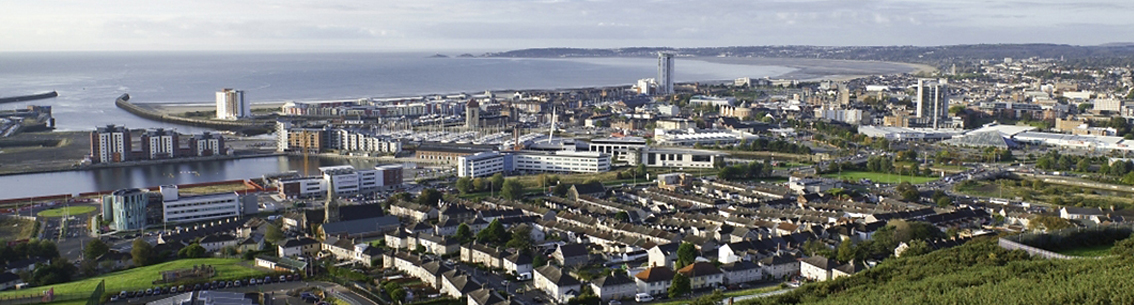
Tallest buildings and structures in Swansea
(Three tallest buildings: The Tower, Meridian Quay 107m, BT Tower 60m, Fusion Students Swansea 60m)
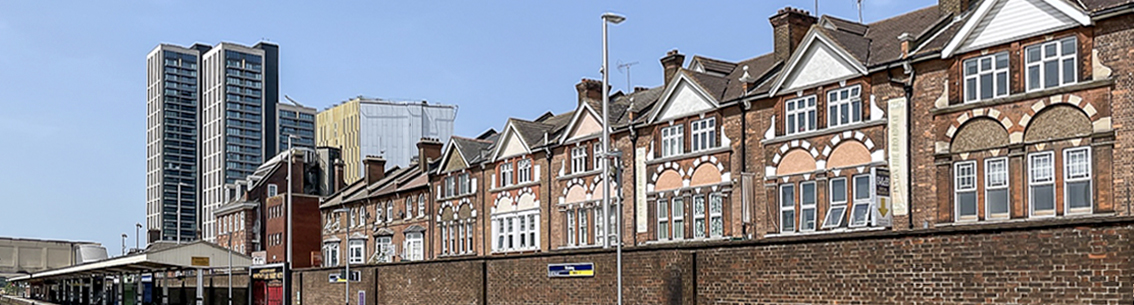
Tallest buildings and structures in Woking
(Three tallest buildings: Victoria Square Tower 1 117m, Victoria Square Tower 2 105m, Victoria Square Hilton Hotel 94m)

== Cities with tallest buildings ==
=== Cities with buildings >100 m ===
The table lists buildings measured by architectural height.

Updated 29 January 2026

County	Total	City/borough	≥300 m	≥250 m	≥200 m	≥150 m	≥100 m	Total
(England) Greater London	132	City of London	—	1	3	8	14	26
(England) Greater London	132	City of Westminster	—	—	—	—	4	4
(England) Greater London	132	Camden	—	—	—	—	3	3
(England) Greater London	132	Croydon	—	—	—	1	4	5
(England) Greater London	132	Ealing	—	—	—	1	1	2
(England) Greater London	132	Greenwich	—	—	—	—	1	1
(England) Greater London	132	Hackney	—	—	—	1	3	4
(England) Greater London	132	Hammersmith and Fulham	—	—	—	—	3	3
(England) Greater London	132	Haringey	—	—	—	—	1	1
(England) Greater London	132	Islington	—	—	—	1	3	4
(England) Greater London	132	Kensington and Chelsea	—	—	—	—	1	1
(England) Greater London	132	Lambeth	—	—	—	2	6	8
(England) Greater London	132	Lewisham	—	—	—	—	2	2
(England) Greater London	132	Newham	—	—	—	—	13	13
(England) Greater London	132	Redbridge	—	—	—	—	1	1
(England) Greater London	132	Southwark	1	—	—	2	7	10
(England) Greater London	132	Tower Hamlets	—	—	8	11	18	37
(England) Greater London	132	Wandsworth	—	—	1	2	3	6
(England) Greater London	132	Waltham Forest	—	—	—	—	1	1
(England) Greater Manchester	28	Manchester	—	—	1	8	13	22
(England) Greater Manchester	28	Salford	—	—	—	1	5	6
(England) West Midlands	12	Birmingham	—	—	—	2	10	12
(England) West Yorkshire	4	Leeds	—	—	—	—	4	4
(England) Merseyside	2	Liverpool	—	—	—	—	2	2
(England) Surrey	2	Woking	—	—	—	—	2	2
(England) East Sussex	1	Brighton	—	—	—	—	1	1
(England) South Yorkshire	1	Sheffield	—	—	—	—	1	1
(Wales) City and County of Swansea	1	Swansea	—	—	—	—	1	1

=== Cities with buildings >100 m (under construction) ===
List measures buildings by architectural height

Updated 9 September 2025

County	Total	City/borough	≥300 m	≥250 m	≥200 m	≥150 m	≥100 m	Total
(England) Greater London	22	City of London	—	—	—	2	—	2
(England) Greater London	22	Ealing	—	—	—	—	2	2
(England) Greater London	22	Hammersmith and Fulham	—	—	—	—	1	1
(England) Greater London	22	Haringey	—	—	—	—	1	1
(England) Greater London	22	Newham	—	—	—	—	1	1
(England) Greater London	22	Southwark	—	—	—	1	5	6
(England) Greater London	22	Tower Hamlets	—	—	—	2	7	9
(England) Greater Manchester	8	Manchester	—	—	1	3	3	7
(England) Greater Manchester	8	Salford	—	—	—	—	1	1
(England) West Midlands	3	Birmingham	—	—	—	—	3	3
(England) West Yorkshire	2	Leeds	—	—	—	—	2	2
(England) South Yorkshire	1	Sheffield	—	—	—	—	1	1
(Scotland) Greater Glasgow	1	Anderston	—	—	—	—	1	1

== See also ==
- List of tallest buildings and structures in the United Kingdom by usage
- List of tallest buildings in the United Kingdom by settlement
- List of tallest structures in the United Kingdom
