= Sky Gardens Nine Elms =

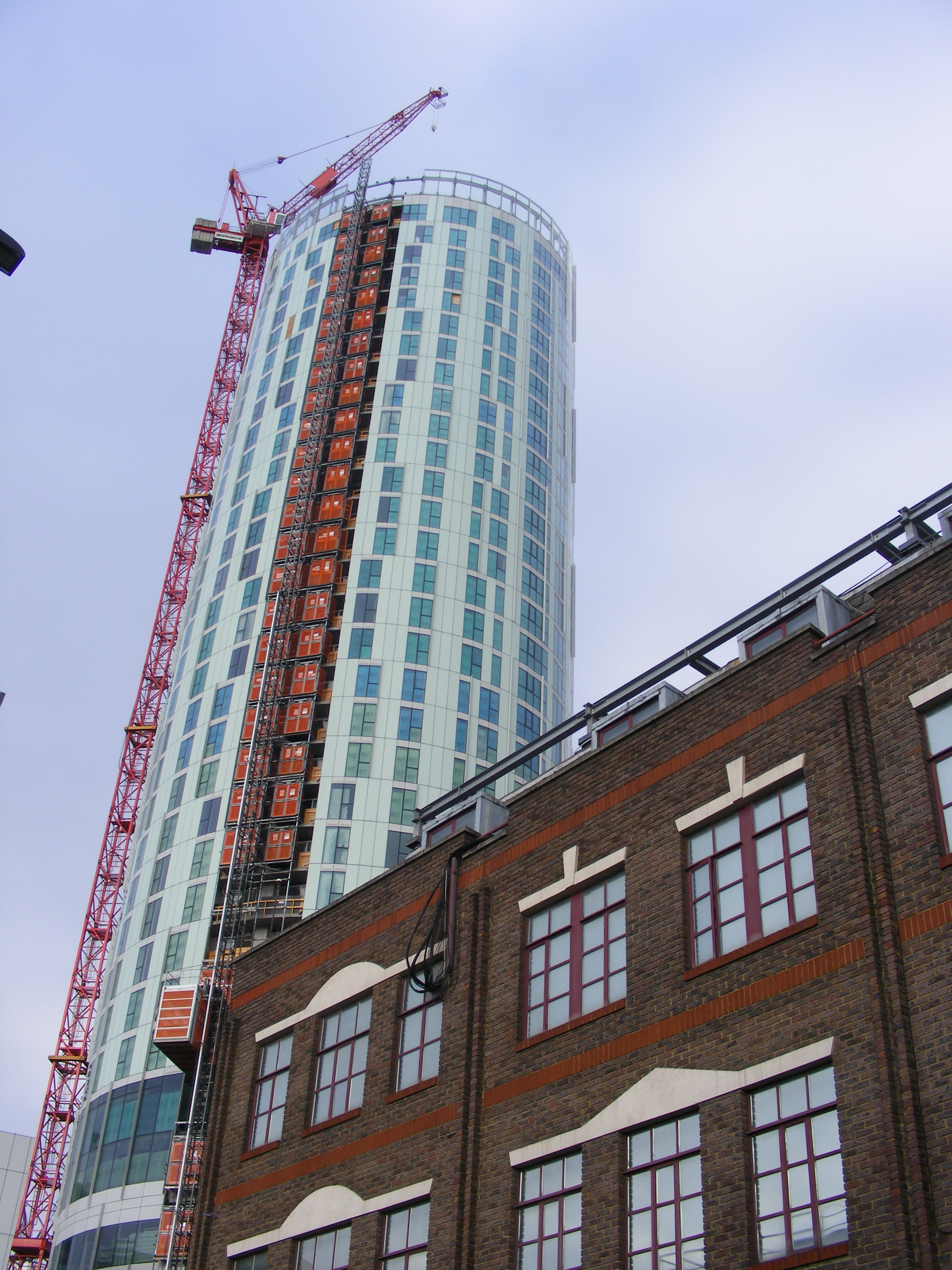
- Under construction in 2016
- Interactive map of the Sky Gardens Nine Elms area

General information
- Status: Completed
- Type: Residential
- Architectural style: Modern
- Location: London, SW8, United Kingdom
- Coordinates: 51.481469°N 0.127577°W
- Construction started: 2014
- Opening: 2017
- Owner: Fraser Property Development UK

Height
- Roof: 120 m AGL (394 ft)

Technical details
- Floor count: 36

Design and construction
- Architecture firm: Careyjones Chapmantolcher (CJCT)
- Main contractor: Mace Group
- Awards: Best Housing Project

Sky Gardens Nine Elms is a residential and retail tower in Nine Elms, within the borough of Lambeth, London. The scheme has been designed by architects Careyjones Chapmantolcher (CJCT) and developed by Fraser Property Development UK. Its construction was part of a wider regeneration of the Nine Elms area of London. The building is 120 metres (390 ft) in height.

== Background and design ==
Fraser Property Development UK proposed plans for Sky Gardens in 2008, designed by Amin Taha Architects and Careyjones Chapmantolcher. These plans included a tower of 120 metres (390 ft)) using only glass cladding. However, in 2010, revised plans were proposed, designed solely by Careyjones Chapmantolcher.

In 2010, Lambeth Borough Council granted planning permission for new proposals which consisted of a 36 storey tower, 239 residential apartments as well as 10,000 square metres (110,000 sq ft) of office space on the first seven floors of the tower. The building would not be clad entirely from glass, and retail space would form part of the scheme, with a low rise element adding affordable housing.

The name given to the development is taken from the 2,500 sq m gardens on its top floor. The gardens include an area for residents to grow a weekly salad box each for nine months of year.

In 2014, Sky Gardens won 'Best Housing Project' at the Sunday Times British Homes Awards.

== Construction ==
Construction began in 2014 after construction company Mace were awarded the contract to build the development. The building topped out in 2016. Construction was completed in April 2017.

== Location ==
Sky Gardens is located on the corner of Wyvil Road and Wandsworth Road. The nearest station is Vauxhall.

== See also ==
- List of tallest buildings and structures in London
- List of tallest buildings in the United Kingdom
