= List of tallest buildings and structures in Leicester =

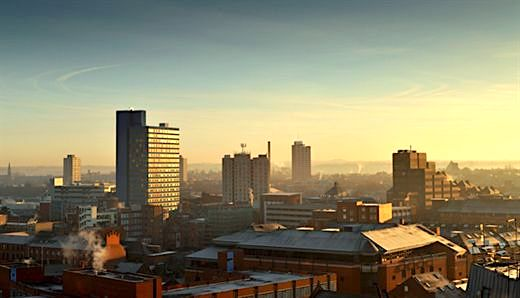
The Central Leicester Skyline

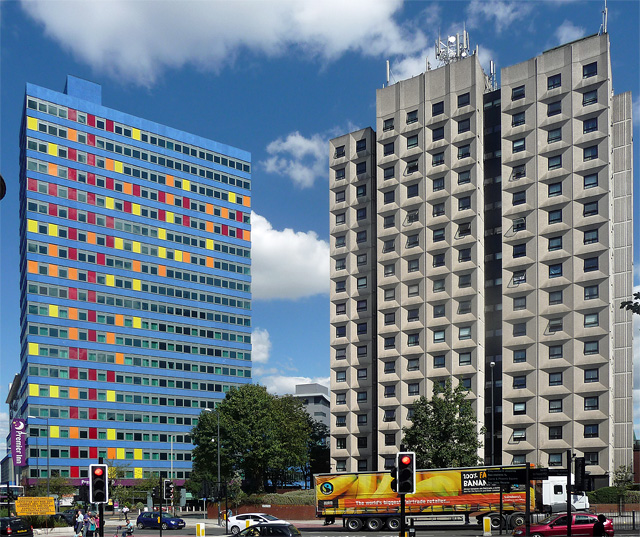
St George's Tower, the 2nd tallest building in Leicester (left) and Elizabeth House, the 15th tallest (right)

This list of tallest buildings and structures in Leicester ranks the tallest completed buildings and free‑standing structures in the city of Leicester, England. The list includes office towers, residential blocks, hotels, churches, and other prominent structures that are significant on the city skyline. Only completed structures above 35 m (115 ft) in height are included; proposals and buildings under construction are listed separately where reliable sources are available.

The proposed Westbridge Hotel Tower, at 117 metres (384 ft), was planned to become the city's tallest building; construction was expected to begin in 2009, but was put on hold due to the effects of the Great Recession.

There are twelve buildings in the city rising 50 metres (160 ft) or more.

== Tallest completed buildings ==
This sections lists the tallest completed buildings in Leicester. Heights include architectural elements, but not communications spires or antennae. The items listed are all buildings in Leicester with a height of 40 m (≈125 ft) and over. Heights are above ground level (AGL)

Rank	Name (Street address)	Postcode sector	Height AGL	Floors	Built	Use	Image
1	Cardinal Telephone Exchange	LE5 0	84 m (276 ft)	17	1970	Commercial Office	
2	St. George's Tower	LE1 1	82 m (269 ft)	20	1960	Commercial Office; Hotel	
3	The Summit, Eastern Boulevard	LE2 7	67 m (220 ft)	22	2013 (2020) (declad)	Residential	
4	Leicester Cathedral	LE1 5	61 m (200 ft)	n/a	1860	Church	
5	Equinox House (previously known as Thames Tower)	LE1 3	58 m (190 ft)	18	1969	Residential	
=6	Clipstone House	LE2 0	52 m (171 ft)	18	1970s	Residential	
=6	Framland House	LE2 0	52 m (171 ft)	18	1970s	Residential	(left to right) Framland House; Gordon House; Maxfield House
=6	Gordon House	LE2 0	52 m (171 ft)	18	1970s	Residential	(left to right) Framland House; Gordon House; Maxfield House
=6	Maxfield House	LE2 0	52 m (171 ft)	18	1970s	Residential	(left to right) Framland House; Gordon House; Maxfield House
=6	Attenborough Building (University of Leicester)	LE1 7	52 m (171 ft)	18	1970	University	
11	The Empire Banqueting Hall (formerly St. Mark's Church)	LE1 3	51 m (167 ft)	n/a	1876	Banqueting Hall; former church	
12	International Hotel	LE1 1	50 m (160 ft)	12	1970	Ex Office; Ex Hotel	
13	De Montfort House	LE1 5	48 m (157 ft)	16	c. 1996	Residential	
14	Merlin Wharf	LE3 5	47 m (154 ft)	15	2020	Residential	
15	Elizabeth House	LE2 0	46 m (151 ft)	16	1976	Residential	
=16	Midland House, 60 Charles St.	LE1 1	45 m (148 ft)	14	1976	Office; Retail	
=16	Opal Court	LE1 7	45 m (148 ft)	15	2003	Residential; Retail	
=16	Leicester Crown House	LE1 3	45 m (148 ft)	11	c. 1972	Office	
=16	St. John's House	LE1 6	45 m (148 ft)	11	c. 1975	Office	
20	Carrick Point	LE5 4	44 m (144 ft)	14	c. 1975	Residential	
21	Merlin Heights	LE3 5	43 m (141 ft)	16	2016	Residential	
22	The Charles Wilson Building, University of Leicester	LE1 7	43 m (141 ft)	13	1966	University	
23	The Wullcomb, Vaughan Way	LE1 4	42 m (138 ft)	5,7,10,12	2019	Residential; Retail	
=24	Lewis's Tower, Humberstone Gate	LE1 1	41 m (135 ft)	n/a	1936	Retail	
=24	National Space Centre	LE4 5	41 m (135 ft)	N/A	2001	Visitor attraction/ museum	

== Tallest buildings yet to complete ==
This is a list of the tallest buildings yet to complete in Leicester (over ≈ 40 m /≈130 ft/ in height) that are under construction or approved (c.2000–present).

Name (Street address)	Postcode sector	Height AGL	Floors	Completion date	Use	Developer	Architect(s)	Status
Block A Bath Lane	LE3 5	73 m (240 ft)	24		Residential	Urban Invest	Leach Rhodes Walker	Approved
Student Village, UoL Ext'n	LE2 6, LE2 7	43 m (141 ft)	5,9,14	2022 (est.)	Residential; University			Topped out
Humberstone Gate (Cultural Quarter)	LE1 1	≅ 65 m (213 ft)	21		Residential	Land Invest Ltd	Boden Associates	Under re/construction
97 Churchgate	LE1 3	45 m (148 ft)	14	(start before 2/2024)	Residential; Hotel	Mabble Limited	Maber Associates	Conditional Approval

== See also ==
- List of tallest buildings in the United Kingdom
