= Opus, London =

Approved skyscraper development in London

Opus
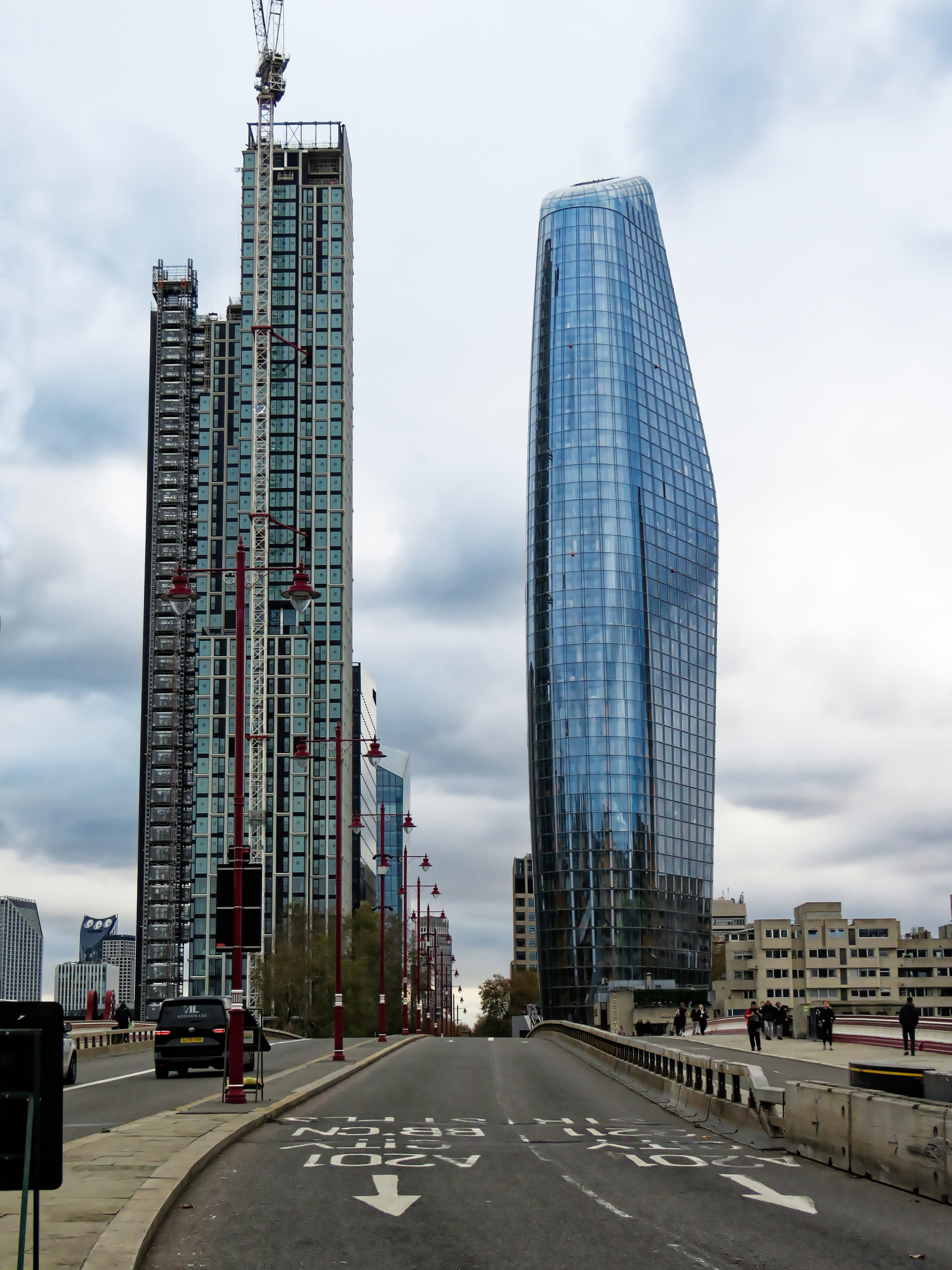
- Opus (left) and One Blackfriars

General information
- Type: Residential
- Location: Bankside, London, England
- Coordinates: 51.507951°N 0.103937°W
- Construction started: 2019
- Completed: 2026 (topped out)

Height
- Roof: 170 m (560 ft)

Technical details
- Floor count: 50

Design and construction
- Architecture firm: PLP Architecture

Opus is a residential skyscraper under construction in Bankside, London. The building was topped out in September 2025, and with a quoted height of 170 m (560 ft) claims to be the tallest residential building in central London. The building is expected to be completed by 2027. It is part of the emerging skyscraper cluster around Bankside.

== Background and description ==
Designs by PLP Architecture were submitted by developer Native Land in 2020 and planning permission was granted the same year. Construction began in 2024. Private amenities in the building include a padel court, bouldering wall, gym, Pilates studio and health centre.

== See also ==
- One Blackfriars
- 18 Blackfriars
