= 54 Marsh Wall =

Planned residential building in London, England

Coordinates: 51.5009°N 0.0217°W

- Interactive map of the 54 Marsh Wall area

General information
- Status: Approved
- Type: Residential
- Architectural style: Modern
- Location: London, E14; United Kingdom, 54 Marsh Wall
- Construction started: 2017
- Opening: 2031

Height
- Roof: 140 m AGL (459 ft)

Technical details
- Floor count: 41

Design and construction
- Architect: Rolfe Judd
- Main contractor: Daejan Limited

54 Marsh Wall is a planned residential/retail skyscraper in the Isle of Dogs, London. The building was approved by Tower Hamlets on 19 January 2017. At 140 m (460 ft) high and containing 216 residential units, the tower will be among a number of similar residential skyscrapers under construction in the Isle of Dogs, including South Quay Plaza and the Landmark Pinnacle. An earlier proposal, submitted in 2014, envisioned 240 residential units involving two twin towers at 39 and 29 stories. The structure is due to be completed in 2031.

== See also ==
- List of tallest buildings and structures in London
- List of tallest buildings in the United Kingdom
