= List of tallest buildings and structures in Southampton =

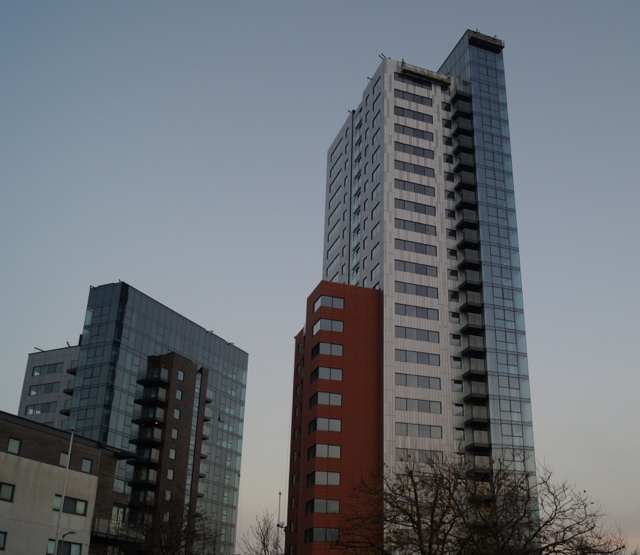
The Moresby tower and shorter Hawkins tower, part of the Admirals Quay development at Ocean Village

This list of the tallest buildings and structures in Southampton ranks skyscrapers and structures in Southampton.

The city's tallest structures are the 130 metres (430 ft) container port cranes. The tallest inhabitable structure is the 280 feet (85 m) Centenary quay tower, although several others are planned that will exceed this.

== Tallest buildings and structures ==
An equal sign (=) following a rank indicates the same height between two or more buildings.

Rank	Name	Use	Image	Height (m)	Height (ft)	Floors	Year	Notes
1	Container port cranes	Shipping		Nearly 150		N/A	2026	
2	Container port cranes	Shipping		130	427	N/A	2018	
3	Container port cranes	Shipping		126	413	N/A	2014	
4	Centenary Quay	Residential		89	278	27	2022	
5	Moresby Tower	Residential		80	262	26	2014	
6	Millbrook Towers	Residential		73	240	25	1965	
7	Canberra Towers	Residential		70	230	25	1967	
8	Norwich House	Residential		62	203	16		
9	St Mary's Church	Church		61	200		1878 (restored 1954)	
10	Redbridge Tower	Residential		58	190	19	1963	
11	Dukes Keep	Office		55	180	15		
12	Mercury Point	Residential		52	171	17	2004	
13	Mayflower Halls	Residential		53	174	15	2014	
14	Liberty Point	Residential		51	168	13		
15	Church of St. Michael the Archangel	Church		50	165		1150 (renovation 1878)	
16=	Capital House	Office		49	160	18	Refurbished 2018	
16=	City Gateway	Residential		49	160	15	2014	
18=	Millbank House	Residential		48	157	16	1960	
18=	Southampton Civic Centre	Mixed		48	157		1933	
20=	Albion Towers	Residential		46	151	16	1965	
20=	Shirley Towers	Residential		46	151	16	1967	
22	Richmond House	Mixed		46	151	13	1970s	
23	Sturminster House	Residential	Tower_Block_UK_photo_s13-10	44	144	16	1960s	
24=	Hampton Tower	Residential	Weston-tower-blocks	41	132	13	1960s	
24=	Havre Tower	Residential	Weston-tower-blocks-clouds	41	132	13	1960s	
24=	Oslo Tower	Residential	Tower_blocks_at_Weston,_as_seen_from_Hythe_-_geograph.org.uk_-_5939280	41	132	13	1960s	
24=	Copenhagen Tower	Residential	Social_Housing_Tower_Blocks_from_Weston_Shore_Southampton_Water_-_geograph.org.uk_-_1652822	41	132	13	1960s	
24=	Rotterdam Tower	Residential	Apartment_blocks,_Weston_-_geograph.org.uk_-_7082709	41	132	13	1960s	
30=	Brampton House	Residential		40	141	15	1960s	
30=	Meredith Towers	Residential	Tower_Block_UK_photo_s13-16	40	130	14	1960s	
30=	Hightown Towers	Residential	Hightown_towers_Southampton	40	130	14	1960s	
30=	Dumbleton Towers	Residential	Tower_Block_UK_photo_s13-17	40	130	14	1960s	
34=	Castle House	Residential	Castle_House_Southampton	37	121	15	1960s	
34=	14 Cumberland house	Student housing		37	121	12	2019	
35	Brunswick Apartments	Residential	Brunswick_apartments	35	115	12	1960s	

== Tallest under construction or approved ==
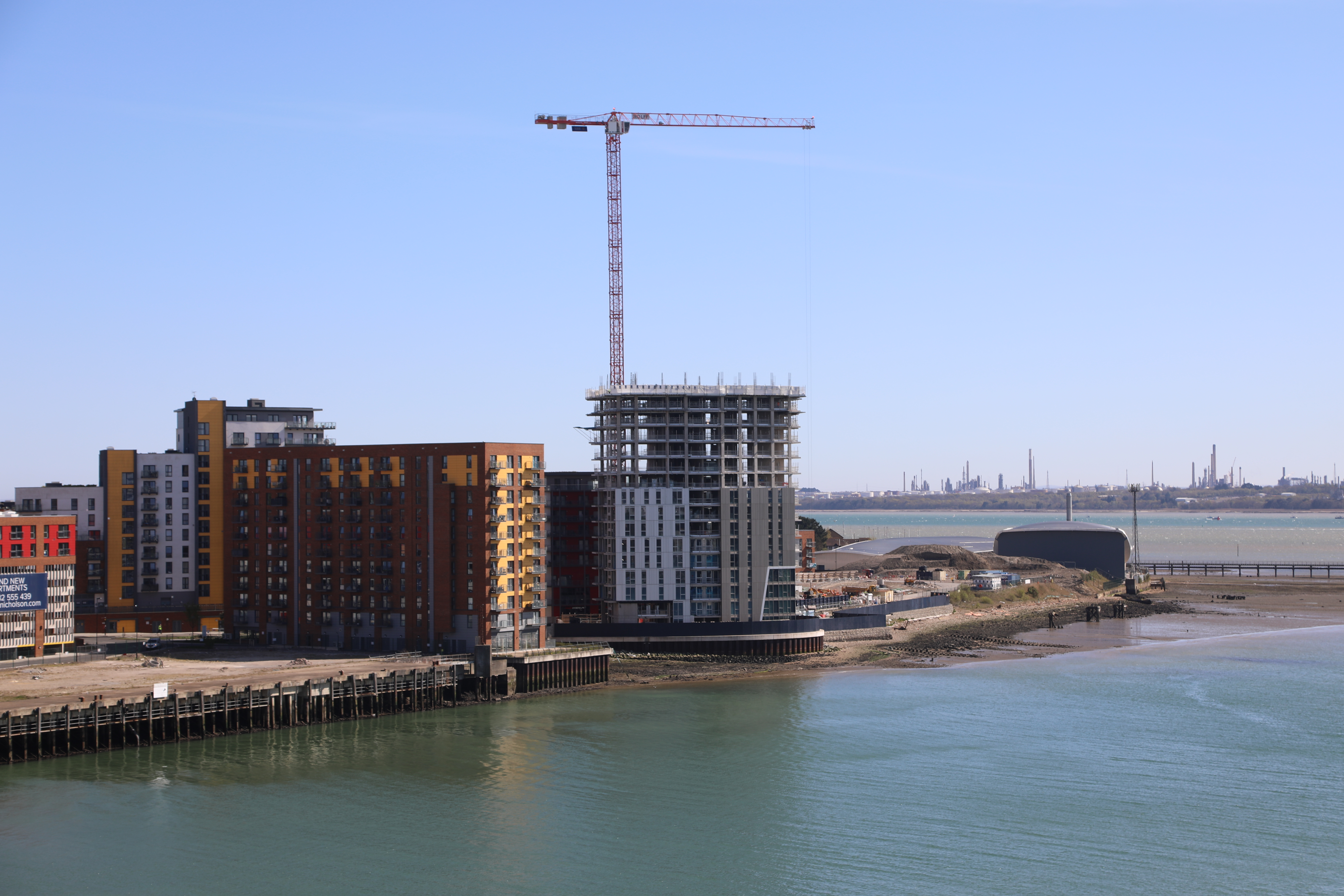
Centenary Quay under construction

Name	Use	Image	Height (m)	Height (ft)	Floors	Notes
Aviva Student Flats – Mama's & Papa's site	Residential		65	225	23	Multiple blocks including a 23-storey tower to be built oppsoite John Lewis
Watermark West Quay	Residential		90	295	26	Received planning permission in 2013 for both phases and phase 1 was completed in 2017 however the second phase has reportedly been put on hold.
Town Quay – 3 x 25 Storey towers	Residential		82	245	25	Planned to take place over 4 years circa 2027. Planning permission still needed to construct on the active waterway.
Maritime Gateway (Cancelled)	Mixed use		73.5	241	23	Was supposed to bring on the demolition of the old Toys "R" Us site. Scheduled to start in late 2022, but was cancelled in March 2025.
Britannia Road Tower	Residential		67.5	221	20	Demolition for the gasworks has begun as of October 2022 which is where this building will be placed. No construction active as of March 2026.
Houndwell Place	Residential		55	180	17	Will be constructed upon the old Debenhams site. The site was fully demolished in 2025, with construction scheduled to start in 2026.
Bargate Quarter	Mixed use		45	141	13	Under construction and due to be completed end of 2026.
The Firehouse	Student flats		38	126	13	Construction began start of 2026 after approval in 2023. Completion around end of 2027.
Millbrook Rd East Student Flats	Residential		58	200	20	Approved in 2025.
Shirley - Brownfield Site Student Flats	Residential		33	99	11	
St Marys student flats	Residential		51	153	17	
Mercury Point rebuild	Residential		70	189	21	Demolition and rebuilding of Mercury Point – awaiting approval.
Commercial Point flats	Residential		54	162	18	Demolition and rebuilding of Commercial Point – awaiting approval.
Northam Gasworks flat scheme	Residential		51	153	17	4 blocks up to 17-storeys
Ocean Village flats	Residential		75	225	25	Awaiting approval but has faced problems

== Demolished ==
Name	Use	Image	Height (m)	Height (ft)	Floors	Built	Demolished	Notes
South Stoneham House	Residential		49	160	16			
Faraday Building (Building 21)	University		47	154	12	1960		Currently being demolished (as of 29 November 2023) for possible asbestos inside.
