= 150 High Street, Stratford =

Coordinates: 51.5348°N 0.0065°W

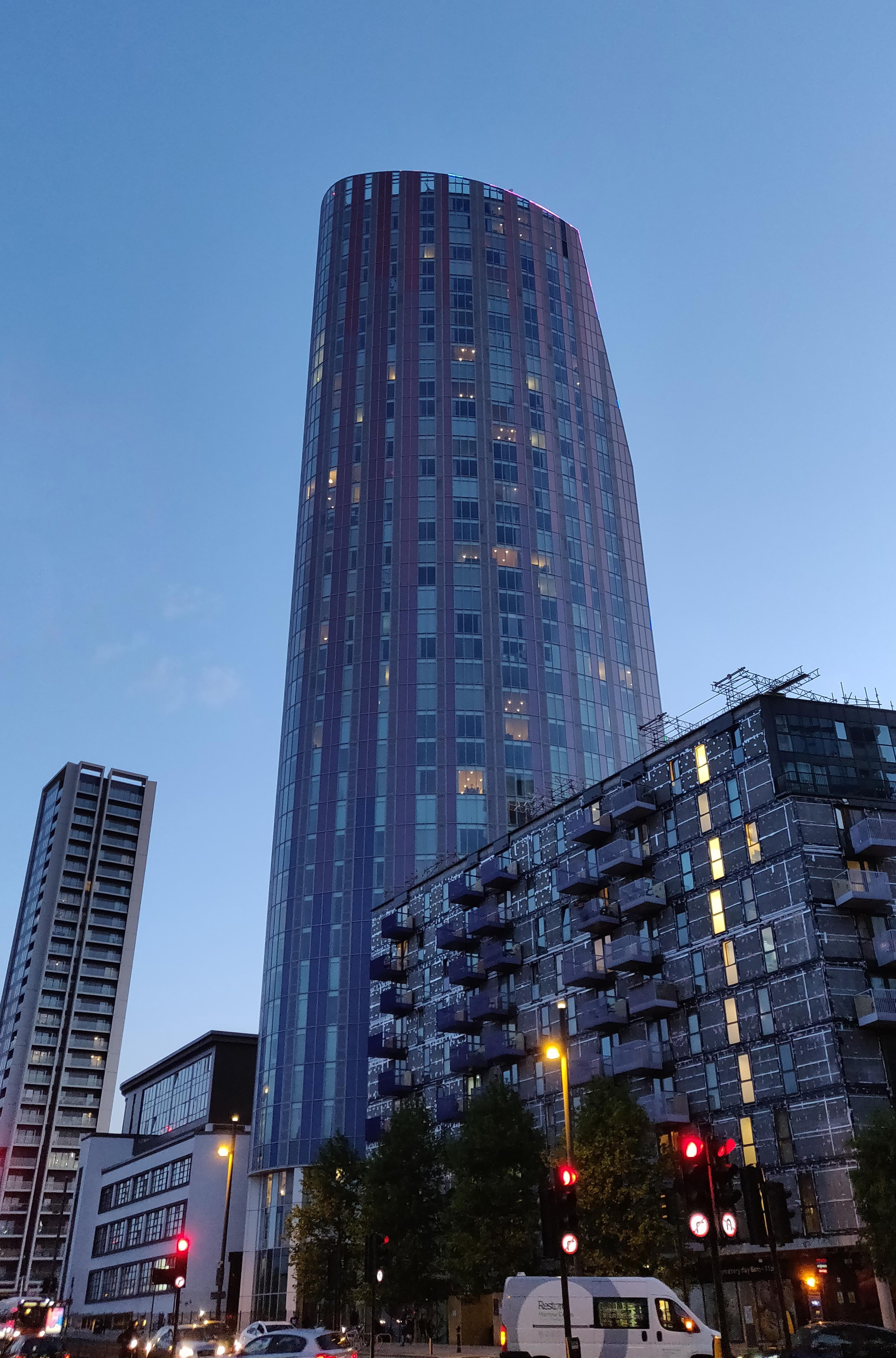

General information
- Status: Completed
- Type: Residential
- Location: London, E15; United Kingdom
- Construction started: 2008
- Completed: 2013

Height
- Roof: 131.88 metres (433 ft)

Technical details
- Floor count: 43
- Floor area: 129,167 sq ft (12,000 m^{2})

158 High Street, Stratford, also known as the Stratford Halo, is a 43-storey 135 m (443 ft) high residential tower in Stratford, London. It began construction in 2008 and was completed in 2013. As of 2026, it is the 61st tallest structure in London.

The Halo Tower forms part of a larger development also known as Stratford Halo. This is a mixed-tenure collection of market rent, social rent, shared ownership and special needs apartments managed by housing association Notting Hill Genesis.

In August 2025 residents of the Sapphire Court building within the development were evacuated due to structural issues. Amber Court, Opal Court, and Ruby Court were subsequently evacuated in December 2025, although the Halo Tower itself is unaffected.

== Architecture ==
The development was designed by Stock Woolstencroft Architects.

The tower, rising to 43 storeys, has a blue and purple exterior cladding. The development is accompanied by two medium rise buildings of seven and ten storeys. It has three enclosed multi-storey sky gardens.

In 2014, The Guardian included it in their list of "Horror storeys: the 10 worst London skyscrapers". Others in the list included 20 Fenchurch Street (also known as "The Walkie Talkie") and the Vauxhall Tower.

== See also ==
- List of tallest buildings and structures in London
