= One Bishopsgate Plaza =

Highrise residential development in London

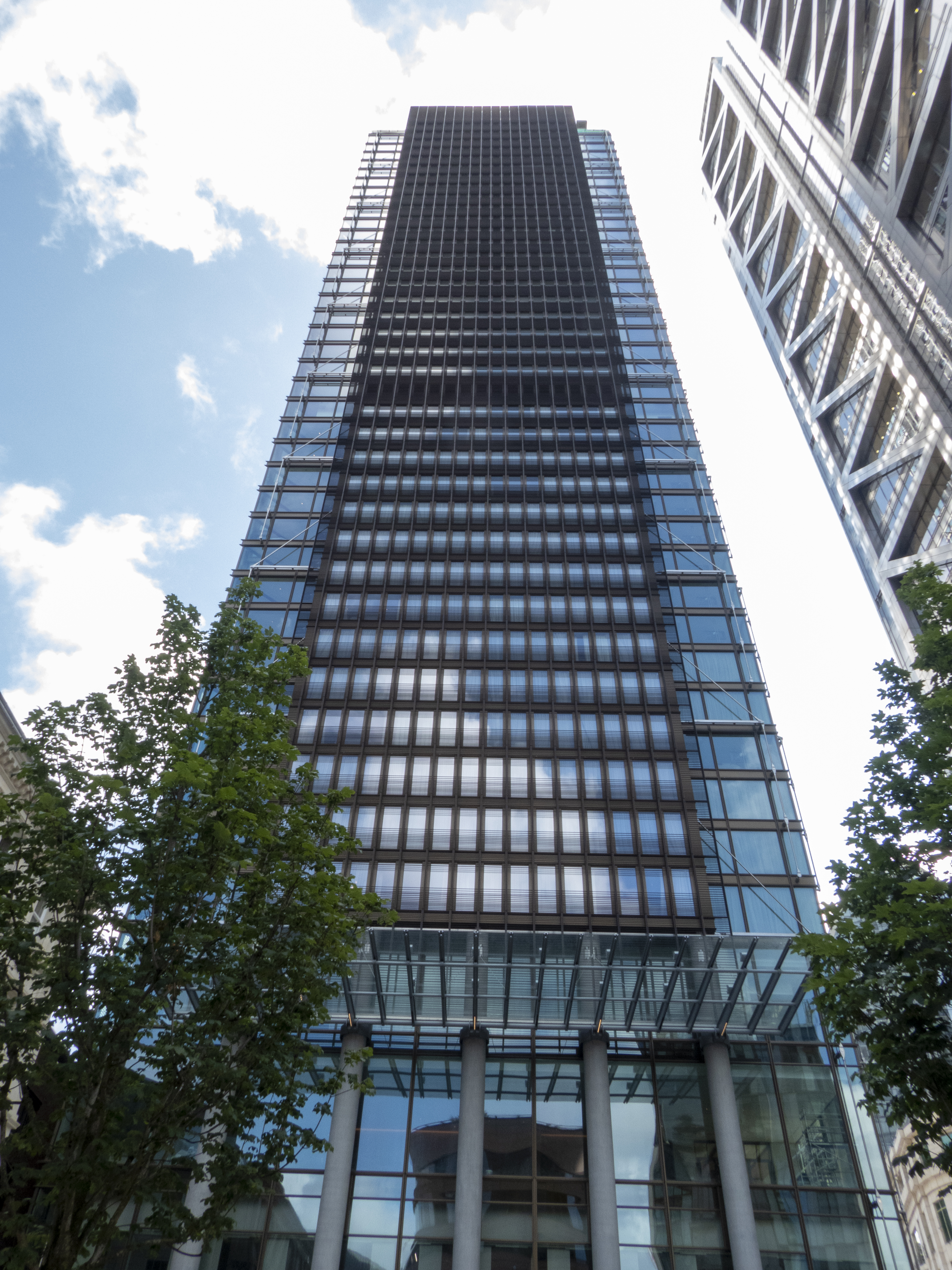
- One Bishopsgate Plaza

General information
- Type: Residential
- Location: Bishopsgate, London
- Coordinates: 51.516516°N 0.080121°W
- Construction started: 2016
- Completed: 2021

Height
- Roof: 136 m (446 ft)

Technical details
- Floor count: 42

Design and construction
- Architecture firm: PLP Architecture

One Bishopsgate Plaza is a residential residential highrise tower on Bishopsgate in the City of London. The 42 storey building rises to a height of 136 m (446 ft).

== Background and description ==
The building was developed by UOL Group and designed by PLP Architecture. Unlike most of the highrises in the City of London, the building was devised as a residential tower, comprising London's first Pan Pacific Hotel on the lower floors, and 160 flats across the 21st to 41st floors. The developers of the building also notably avoided penthouses.

Construction began in 2016, and the tower was completed by 2021. The redevelopment included the refurbishment of a number of buildings along the north of Bishopsgate Plaza, including Devonshire House.

== See also ==
- Heron Tower
