= Southside, Birmingham =

Central area of Birmingham, England

Coordinates: 52.475°N 1.897°W

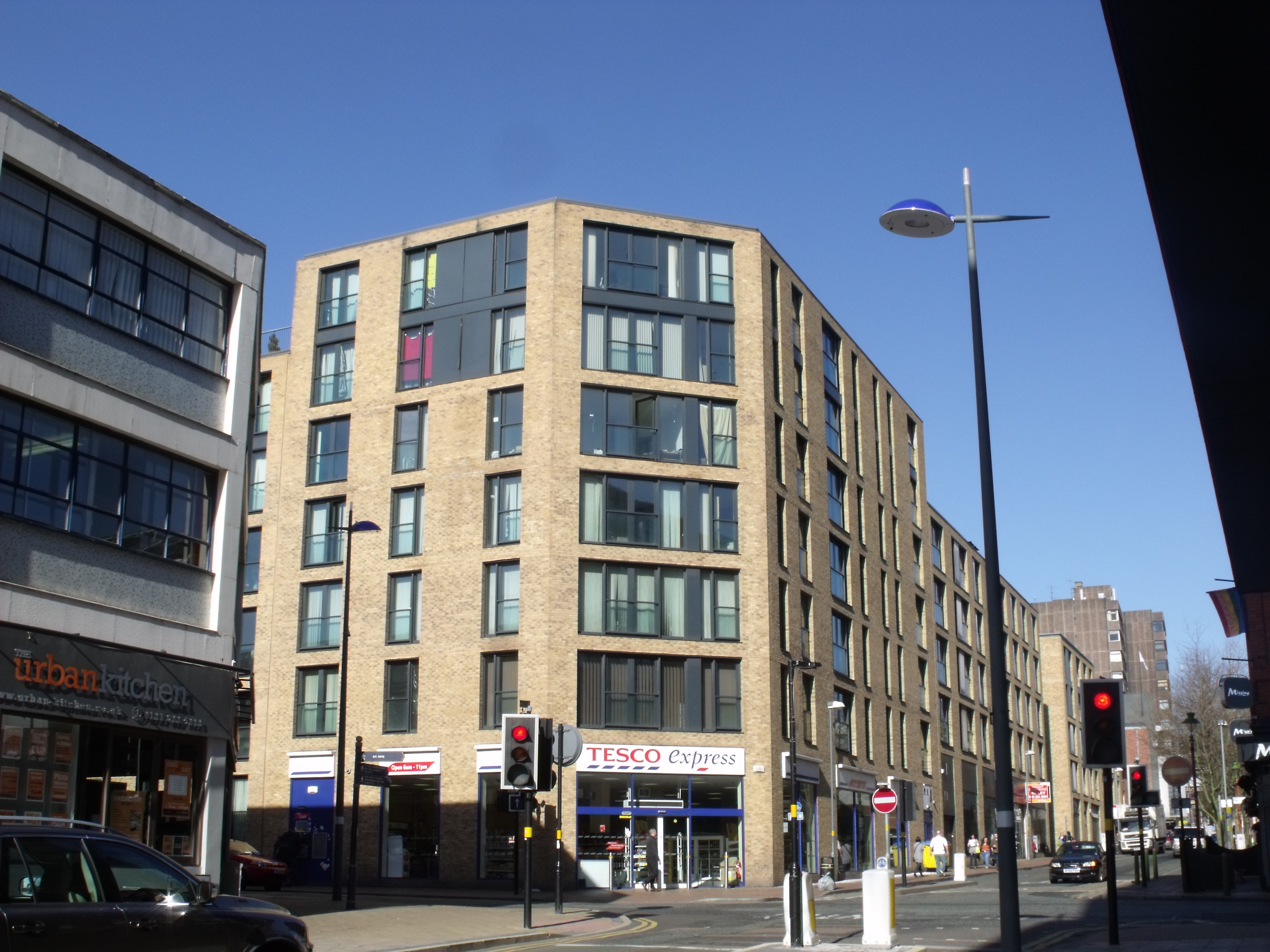
The Southside Apartments on Hurst Street

Southside is a new name for the district in the city centre of Birmingham, England. It contains the Chinese Quarter, the city's Gay Village, The Arcadian and the Hippodrome Theatre.

At the end of May 2009, the Birmingham City Council approved plans for a £530,000 environmental improvement scheme at the heart of the city's Gay Village area. The changes included extending the avenue of street trees to the full length of Hurst Street and parts of Kent Street; widening pavements to create space for café bars to provide outdoor seating and brighter street lighting with decorative lanterns.
