= 18 Blackfriars =

Approved skyscraper development in London

General information
- Type: Mixed use
- Location: Bankside, London, England
- Coordinates: 51.506808°N 0.105330°W

Height
- Roof: 195 m (640 ft)

Technical details
- Floor count: 48

Design and construction
- Architecture firm: Foster and Partners

18 Blackfriars also known as "The Round" is an approved mixed-use skyscraper development in Bankside, London. Designed by Foster and Partners the scheme includes two skyscrapers, an office tower rising 48 storeys to 195 m (640 ft) and a 44 storey residential tower reaching 151 m (495 ft). The office tower will be the tallest building of the emerging skyscraper cluster around Bankside.

== Background ==
Proposals for redevelopment of the site were first brought forward in 2008 and then in 2016. In 2021, the site was acquired by Hines and the scheme designed by Fosters and Partners was presented in 2023. Planning permission was granted in 2024. In 2025, work was delayed as amendments were made to the plans, construction is expected to be completed by 2030.

== See also ==
- One Blackfriars
- Southbank Tower
