= List of tallest buildings and structures in Brighton and Hove =

Skyline of Brighton and Hove
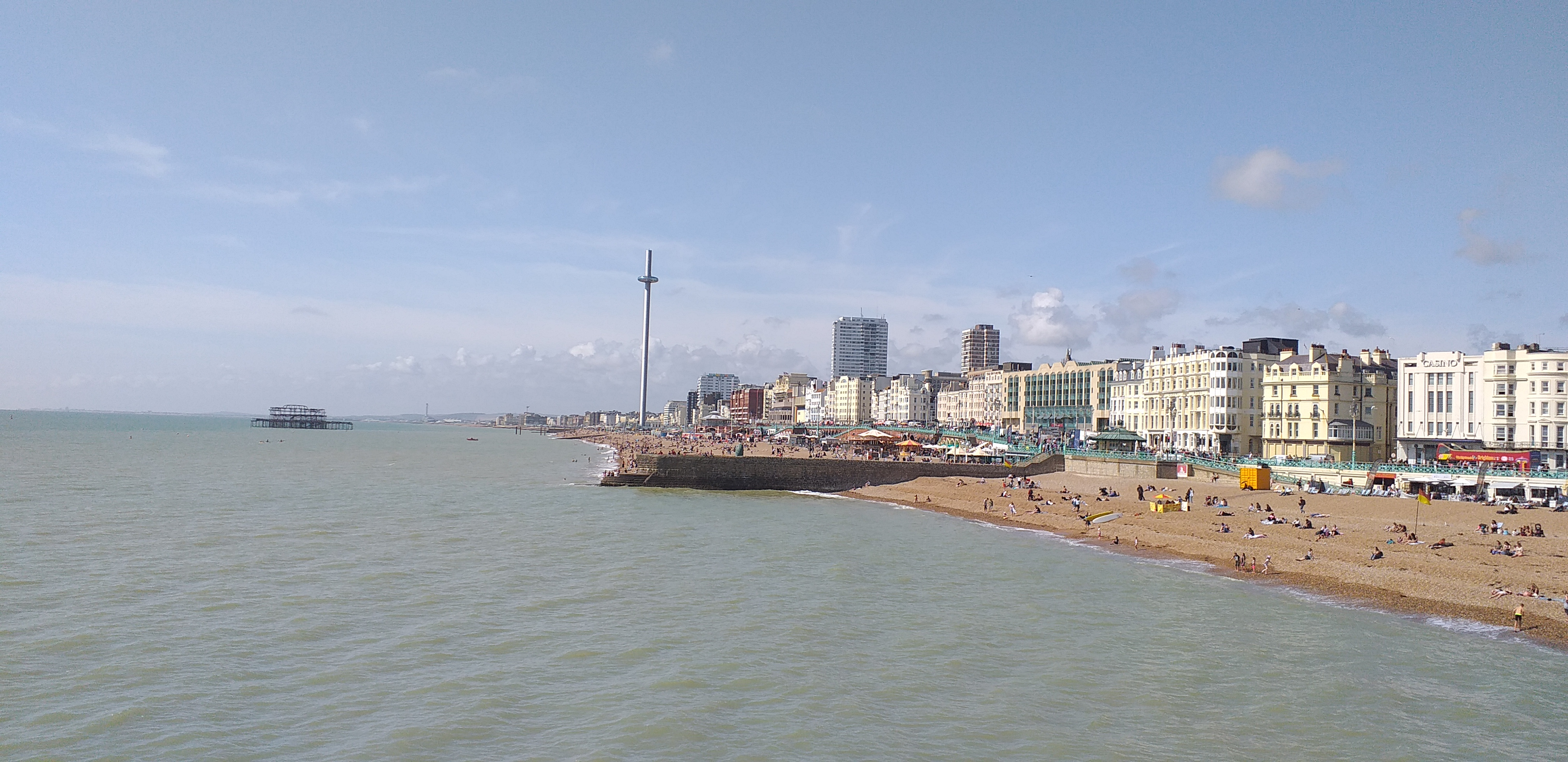
- Central Brighton viewed from the Palace Pier, showing some of the city's tallest buildings
- Tallest building: Sussex Heights (1968)
- Tallest building height: 102 m (335 ft)
- Tallest structure: Brighton i360 (2016)
- Tallest structure height: 162 m (531 ft)

Number of tall buildings
- Taller than 50 m (164 ft): 11
- Taller than 100 m (328 ft): 1

This list of tallest buildings and structures in Brighton and Hove ranks buildings and other structures by height in Brighton and Hove, United Kingdom, that are at least 40 m (130 ft) tall.

The tallest building in the city is Sussex Heights at 102 m (335 ft), which has been the tallest building in Sussex since its completion in 1968. The Brighton i360 is the city's tallest structure at 162 m (531 ft), completed in 2016; it does not count as a building because it has no floors.

== Map of tallest structures ==
The map below shows the location of every structure taller than 40 m (130 ft) in Brighton and Hove. Each marker is numbered by the building's height rank and colored by the decade of its completion.

Structures taller than 40 m (130 ft) in Brighton and Hove
- 1950s and before
- 1960s
- 1970s
- 1980s
- 1990s
- 2000s
- 2010s
- 2020s
1 Brighton i360
2 Rampion Wind Farm
3 Sussex Heights
4 Thomas Kemp Tower
5 Chartwell Court
6 Longley Place
7 Theobald House
8 Goldstone Hall
9 Louisa Martindale Building
10 Hove Gardens
11 Whitehawk Hill transmitting station
12 Bedford Towers
13 Essex Place
14 Wellesbourne, South
15 Moda, Hove Central Block E
16 Wiltshire House
17 Hereford Court
18 St John the Baptist's Church
19 iQ Brighton Block 8
20 Cockcroft Building
21 Wellesbourne, North
22 Wellesbourne, Central
23 St James's House
24 Preston Hall
25 Pelham Tower
26 St Bartholomew's Church
27 Moda, Hove Central Block C
28 Nettleton Court
29 Dudeney Lodge
30 iQ Brighton Block 6
31 Cavendish House
32 Somerset Point
33 Warwick Mount
34 American Express Brighton
35 Falmer Stadium
36 St Peter's Church

== Tallest structures ==
This list ranks completed and topped out structures that stand at least 40 m (130 ft) tall in Brighton and Hove. An equal sign (=) following a rank indicates the same height between two or more buildings. The "Year" column indicates the year in which a building was completed.

Was the city's tallest structure upon completion

Rank	Name	Image	Height m (ft)	Floors	Year completed	Primary use	Notes
1	Brighton i360		162 (531)	N/A	2016	Observation	The tallest structure in all of Sussex, which it became in 2015, more than a year before it opened.
2	Rampion Wind Farm		140 (460)	N/A	2017	Wind farm	The first wind farm off the south coast of England, comprising 116 turbines with 55 m (180 ft) blades.
3	Sussex Heights		102 (335)	24	1968	Residential	The tallest building in all of Sussex. When completed in 1968 it "replaced the steeple of St Paul's, West Street as the most significant landmark of Brighton".
4	Thomas Kemp Tower		72 (236)	15	c. 1968	Hospital	
5	Chartwell Court		66 (217)	18	1968	Residential	Built on top of a car park (not included in floor count).
=6	Longley Place		63 (207)	18	2023	Residential	
=6	Theobald House		63 (207)	18	1966	Residential	Built on top of a car park (not included in floor count). An 18-storey block with 110 flats; described in 1987 as "a gaunt tower out of sympathy and scale with its surroundings".
8	Goldstone Hall		61 (200)	18	2021	Residential	
=9	Louisa Martindale Building		58 (191)	13	2023	Hospital	
=9	Hove Gardens		58 (191)	18	2023	Residential	
11	Whitehawk Hill transmitting station		55 (182)	N/A	1959	Communication	
12	Bedford Towers		54 (177)	16	1967	Hotel/Residential	
13	Essex Place		51 (168)	17	1967	Residential	
14	Wellesbourne, South		51 (166)	14	2024	Residential	
=15	Moda, Hove Central Block E		49 (160)	15	2024	Residential	
=15	Wiltshire House		49 (160)	17	1969	Residential	
=15	Hereford Court		49 (160)	17	1969	Residential	
=15	St John the Baptist's Church		49 (160)	N/A	1854	Religion	
19	iQ Brighton Block 8		48 (157)	15	2020	Residential	
20	Cockcroft Building		47 (156)	10	1963	Office	
21	Wellesbourne, North		47 (155)	14	2024	Residential	
22	Wellesbourne, Central		46 (150)	12	2024	Residential	
23	St James's House		45 (148)	16	1966	Residential	
=24	Preston Hall		44 (144)	12	2021	Residential	
=24	Pelham Tower		44 (144)	11	1971	Education	
=24	St Bartholomew's Church		44 (144)	N/A	1874	Religion	
=27	Moda, Hove Central Block C		44 (143)	13	2024	Residential	
=27	Nettleton Court		44 (143)	15	1966	Residential	
=27	Dudeney Lodge		44 (143)	15	1966	Residential	
=30	iQ Brighton Block 6		43 (142)	13	2020	Residential	
=30	Cavendish House		43 (142)	14	1967	Residential	
=30	Somerset Point		42 (138)	13	1964	Residential	
=30	Warwick Mount		42 (138)	13	1964	Residential	
34	American Express Brighton		42 (137)	12	2012	Office	
35	Falmer Stadium		41 (136)	N/A	2011	Stadium	
36	St Peter's Church		41 (135)	N/A	1828	Religion	

== Tallest destroyed or demolished ==
This list ranks structures in Brighton and Hove that were destroyed or demolished and at one time stood at least 40 m (130 ft) in height.

Rank	Name	Image	Height m (ft)	Floors	Year completed	Year demolished	Primary use	Notes
1	Hollingdean Dust Destructor		67 (220)	N/A	1895	1962	Chimney	Height was reduced by 30 ft (9.1 m) to 190 ft (58 m) in 1952 after being struck by lightning.
2	Amex House		46 (151)	9	1977	2017	Office	
3	Dials Congregational Church		46 (150)	N/A	1870	1972	Religion	
4	Brighton Wheel		45 (148)	N/A	2011	2016	Ferris wheel	
5	The Booster		40 (130)	N/A	2006	2023	Ride	

== Timeline of tallest structures ==
This lists structures that once held the title of tallest building in Brighton and Hove.

Name	Image	Years as tallest	Height m (ft)	Floors	Notes
St Peter's Church		1828–1854	41 (135)	N/A	
St John the Baptist's Church		1854–1895	49 (160)	N/A	
Hollingdean Dust Destructor		1895–1962	67 (220)	N/A	Demolished in 1962
Whitehawk Hill transmitting station		1962–1966	55 (182)	N/A	
Theobald House		1966–1968	63 (207)	18	
Sussex Heights		1968–2016	102 (335)	24	
Brighton i360		2016–present	162 (531)	N/A	

== See also ==
- Buildings and architecture of Brighton and Hove
- List of tallest buildings in the United Kingdom

== Bibliography ==
- Brighton Polytechnic. School of Architecture and Interior Design (1987). A Guide to the Buildings of Brighton. Macclesfield: McMillan Martin. ISBN 1-869865-03-0.
