= Sussex Heights =

Residential tower block in Brighton, England

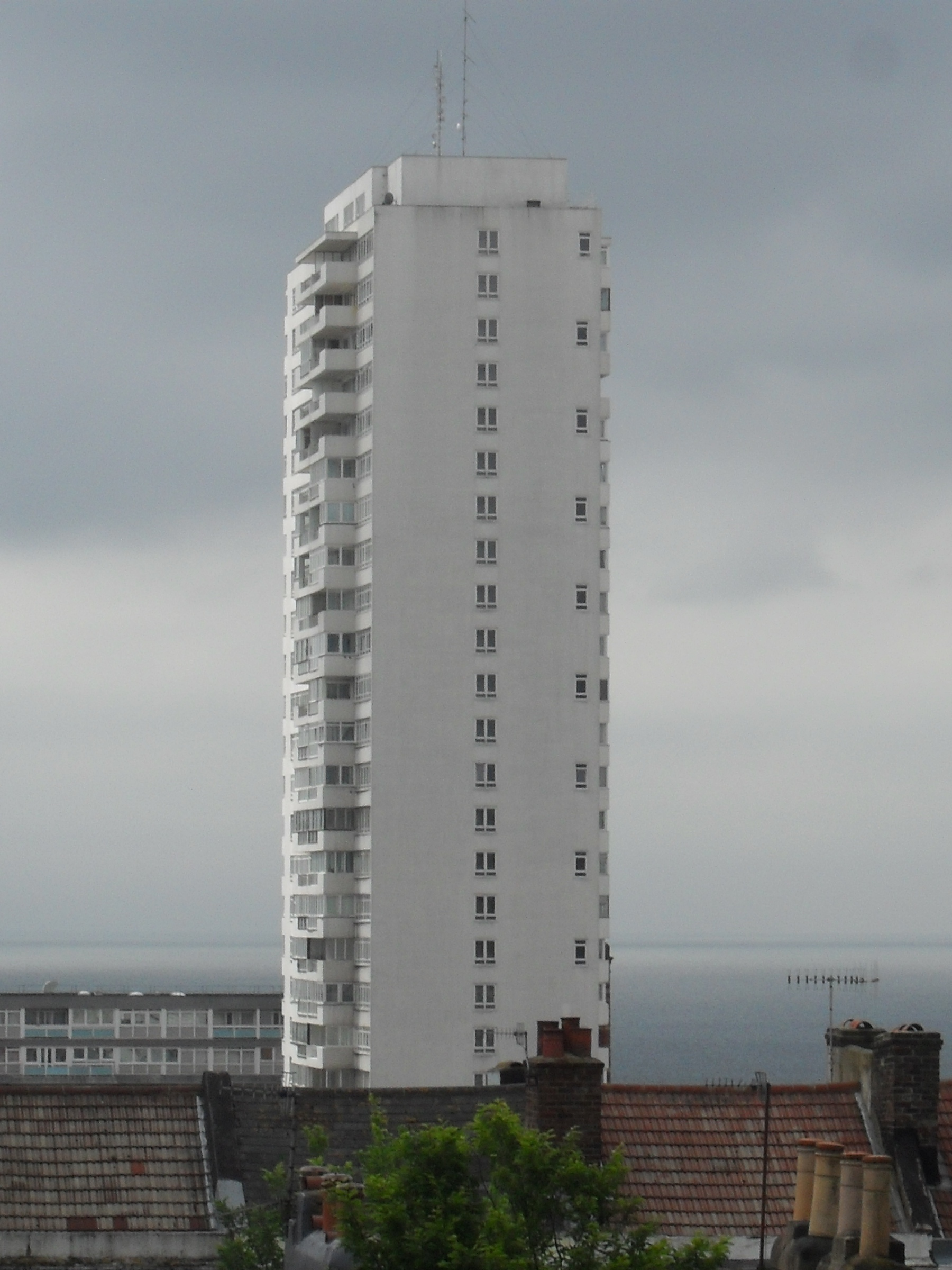
- Sussex Heights seen from the St Nicholas' Church Garden of Rest on Dyke Road (to the north)

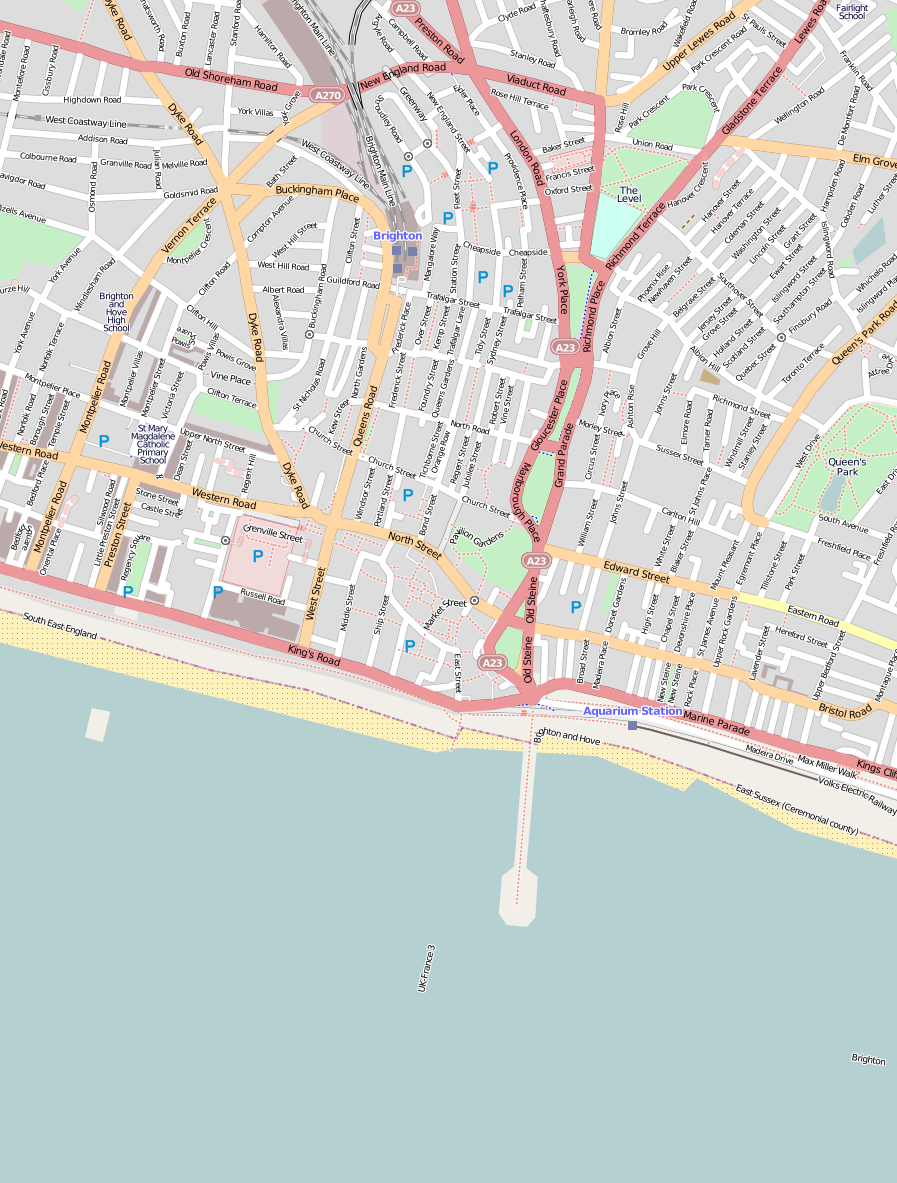
- Location within Brighton

General information
- Type: Residential tower block
- Architectural style: Modernist
- Location: Sussex Heights, St Margaret's Place, Brighton BN1 2FQ, Brighton and Hove, United Kingdom
- Coordinates: 50.8225°N 0.1488°W
- Construction started: 1966
- Completed: 1968
- Owner: Sussex Heights (Brighton) Ltd

Height
- Height: 102 m (335 ft)

Technical details
- Floor count: 24
- Lifts/elevators: 3

Design and construction
- Architect: Richard Seifert
- Architecture firm: R. Seifert & Partners

Sussex Heights is a residential tower block in the centre of Brighton, part of the English city of Brighton and Hove. Built between 1966 and 1968 on the site of a historic church, it rises to 102 m (335 ft) and has 116 flats (including the penthouse). As of August 2022, the tower is the 125th tallest building in the UK, and until 2005 it was the tallest residential tower in the UK outside of London. Until 2015, it was the tallest structure in Brighton and Hove, however it has now been exceeded by the Brighton i360, which stands at 162 metres; the tower is still Brighton and Hove's tallest building, as observation towers do not meet the definition of a building.

Richard Seifert's design has been criticised for its overbearing scale and contrast with neighbouring Regency architecture, but it is acknowledged as an "imposing and prestigious" luxury building. Peregrine falcons have been resident at the top of the tower for several years, and have successfully bred.

== History ==
Charles Busby was part of an architectural partnership (with Amon Wilds and his son Amon Henry Wilds) which gave Brighton much of its character in the 19th century. They met high demand for residential, ecclesiastical and public buildings of all types in the rich, fashionable town by producing elegant designs which combined contemporary architectural expectations with imaginative devices (such as prominent cornices, bold bay windows and columns with decorative capitals) in a distinctively "powerful and assertive" style. Busby has been described as the best architect of the three, having already achieved much by the age of 20. He moved to Brighton in 1822 and joined Amon and Amon Henry Wilds.

One of their commissions was St Margaret's Chapel, a proprietary chapel built near Regency Square for Barnard Gregory, a local speculator and businessman. The Greek Revival/Neoclassical church stood at the end of St Margaret's Place, just behind the seafront. Built in 1824, it was one of five Anglican churches to be constructed in the town in six years—an indication of the growth being experienced at the time. The chapel is usually attributed to Busby alone (and has been called "his finest church" and "the best Classical church in Brighton"), but Amon Henry Wilds has also been identified as its designer. It had a gigantic tetrastyle portico of Ionic columns, a stuccoed façade, a large dome over the nave and a cupola. The first service was on 26 December 1824, and the church could accommodate 1,500 worshippers. John Oldrid Scott carried out alterations in the 1870s.

The church closed on 30 September 1956 after congregations fell. It survived until 1959, but it stood within a zone of proposed redevelopment behind the Metropole Hotel, Alfred Waterhouse's prestigious seafront hotel of 1888 (once England's largest outside London) which was itself about to be altered by the R. Seifert & Partners architectural firm. St Margaret's Chapel was demolished in June of that year, and the same firm was commissioned to build a series of exhibition and conference halls topped by a block of flats on the site. Work on the hotel itself started in 1961, followed a few years later by the rest of the redevelopment. The block of flats was given the name Sussex Heights after the historic county of Sussex in which Brighton is situated, and work started in 1966. The 24-storey tower was finished in 1968. The 334-foot (102 m) building had 91 two-bedroom flats and 24 with one bedroom, all with balconies, allocated garage space and leases of 125 years. The typical sale price of a two-bedroom flat in 1968 was recorded as £5,950; by 2006 it was £250,000 (£432,000 in 2025).

Peregrine falcons have nested at the top of Sussex Heights since early 1998, when a nest box was erected. A breeding pair moved in and successfully reared two chicks. Although the birds occasionally used the (now destroyed) West Pier as well, Sussex Heights has been a successful breeding ground ever since. The Sussex Ornithological Society rings the chicks each year and has installed a webcam through which activity in the nest box can be viewed. As of 2010, 40 chicks have been reared. The nest box was threatened with removal in January 2010 when renovation work was scheduled, but this did not happen and the 2010 breeding season produced two chicks.

In November 2013, Sir Terence Conran's architectural practice Conran and Partners—who had recently worked on Embassy Court and Saltdean Lido elsewhere in the city—were commissioned to refurbish the building. Work was expected to begin in spring 2014.

At 101.8 metres (334 ft) tall, Sussex Heights is the tallest building in Sussex and the only building in Sussex taller than 100 metres (330 ft). It is also the fifth-tallest structure in Sussex, after the British Airways i360 at 162 metres (531 ft) tall, the mast at Heathfield transmitting station at 135 metres (443 ft) tall, the mast at Midhurst transmitting station at 117.7 metres (386 ft) tall and Shoreham Power Station at 106 metres (348 ft) tall.

== Description ==
Sussex Heights was the tallest building in the city of Brighton and Hove. It has 115 flats on 24 floors, plus a penthouse which takes up the whole of the top floor. The 23 floors below the penthouse have five flats each; three face east and two face west, and four have two bedrooms (the other is a single-bedroom flat). Two-bedroom flats typically have a 23-foot (7.0 m) balcony, a 20-by-15.5-foot (6.1 m × 4.7 m) living room, a 10.5-by-7.5-foot (3.2 m × 2.3 m) kitchen, a master bedroom of 18.5 by 11.5 feet (5.6 m × 3.5 m), a second bedroom of 11.5 by 8.5 feet (3.5 m × 2.6 m), a bathroom, separate lavatory and hallway. The bedrooms in single-bedroom flats are considerably larger and have been subdivided in many cases.

Most flats have uninterrupted sea views, and many also have views over the South Downs and the city of Brighton and Hove. The tower has three elevators, two for passengers and one for goods. Other facilities include underground parking garages, communal TV and broadband, concierge and CCTV monitoring. Early advertising material described the flats as "beautifully finished" and "built to the very highest standards", and the building is typically described as a luxury apartment block.

== Architecture ==
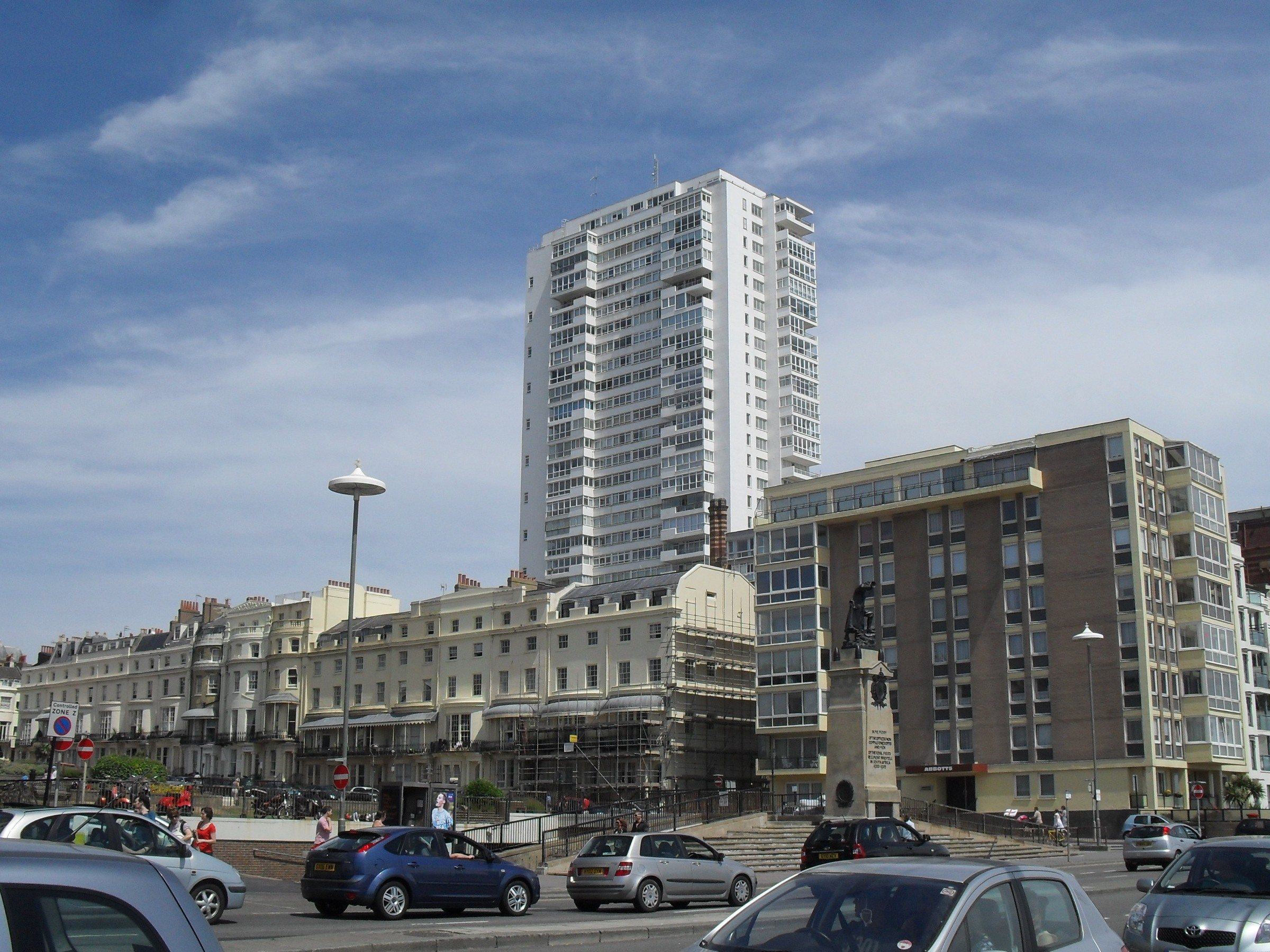
Sussex Heights dominates the skyline above Regency Square and the seafront.

Opinion regarding Sussex Heights' architectural quality and its contribution to Brighton and Hove's cityscape and skyline is mostly negative. Although it stands on the seafront, the lowest ground in the area (Brighton is built on a north–south slope, with the South Downs sloping towards the English Channel), its height dominates the surroundings, which consist mostly of early 19th-century terraces of Regency-style houses of three and four storeys. Its effect on both short- and long-distance views has led to it being called "appalling" and the "most damaging" modern building in the city. Other commentators have noted that it has an "imposing and prestigious" presence, and that it has become Brighton's main landmark (replacing the octagonal tower of the nearby St Paul's Church, which had this status for more than 100 years and was used as a reference point by generations of sailors).

== Ownership ==
Sussex Heights is owned by a management company called Sussex Heights (Brighton) Ltd, which is in turn owned jointly by all lessees—each of whom holds one share. It was formed as a private company limited by shares in 1992. Its company officers are residents of the building, and all shareholders are invited to an annual general meeting.

The company's formation was prompted by concerns that the former freeholder of the lease was letting Sussex Heights become dilapidated and potentially structurally unsound by failing to exercise control over the actions of the managing agency which looked after the building on the freeholder's behalf. The company now oversees the agency's actions and scrutinises its work.
