= Bedford Hotel, Brighton =

Hotel in Brighton, United Kingdom

Bedford Hotel
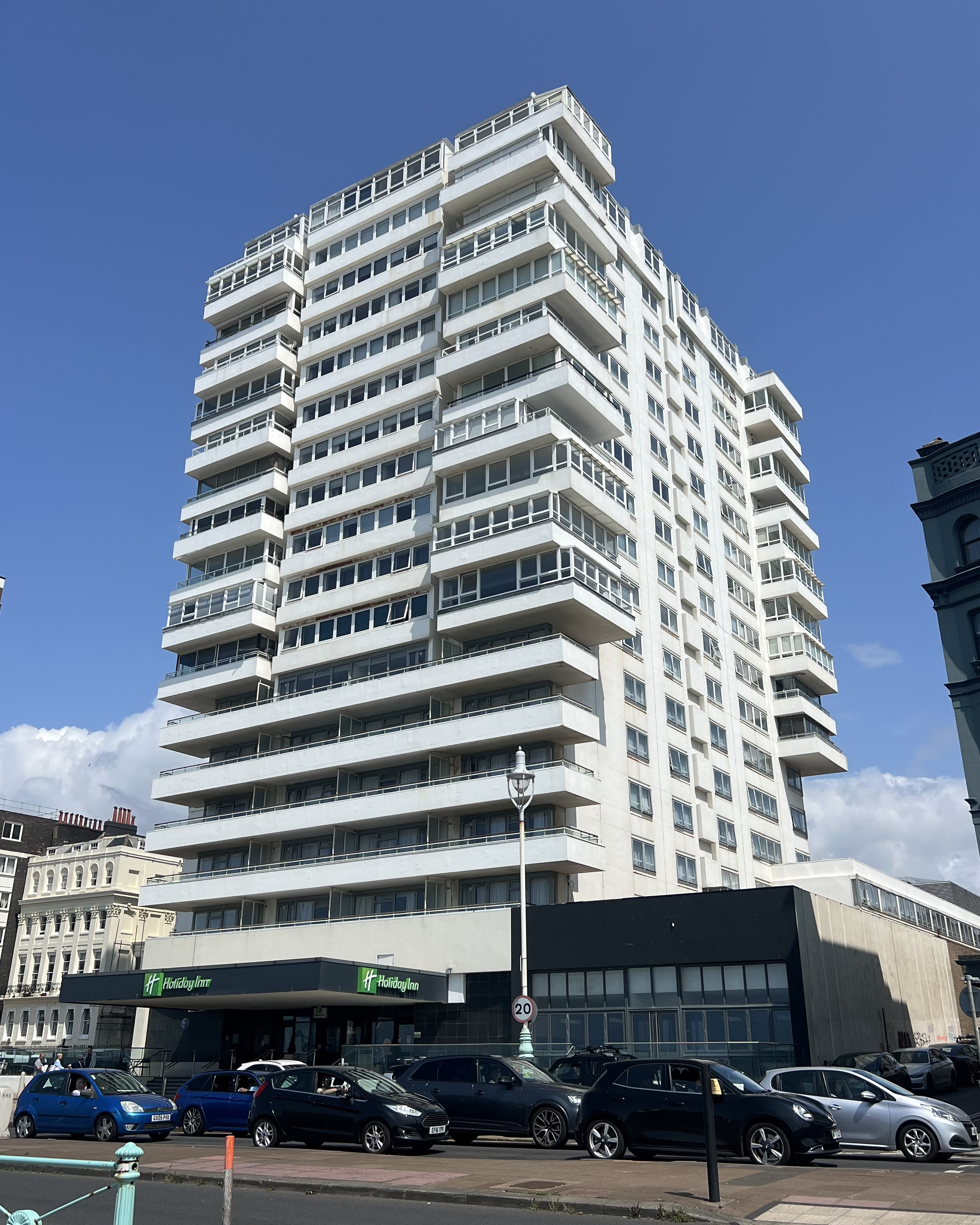
- The hotel from the southeast

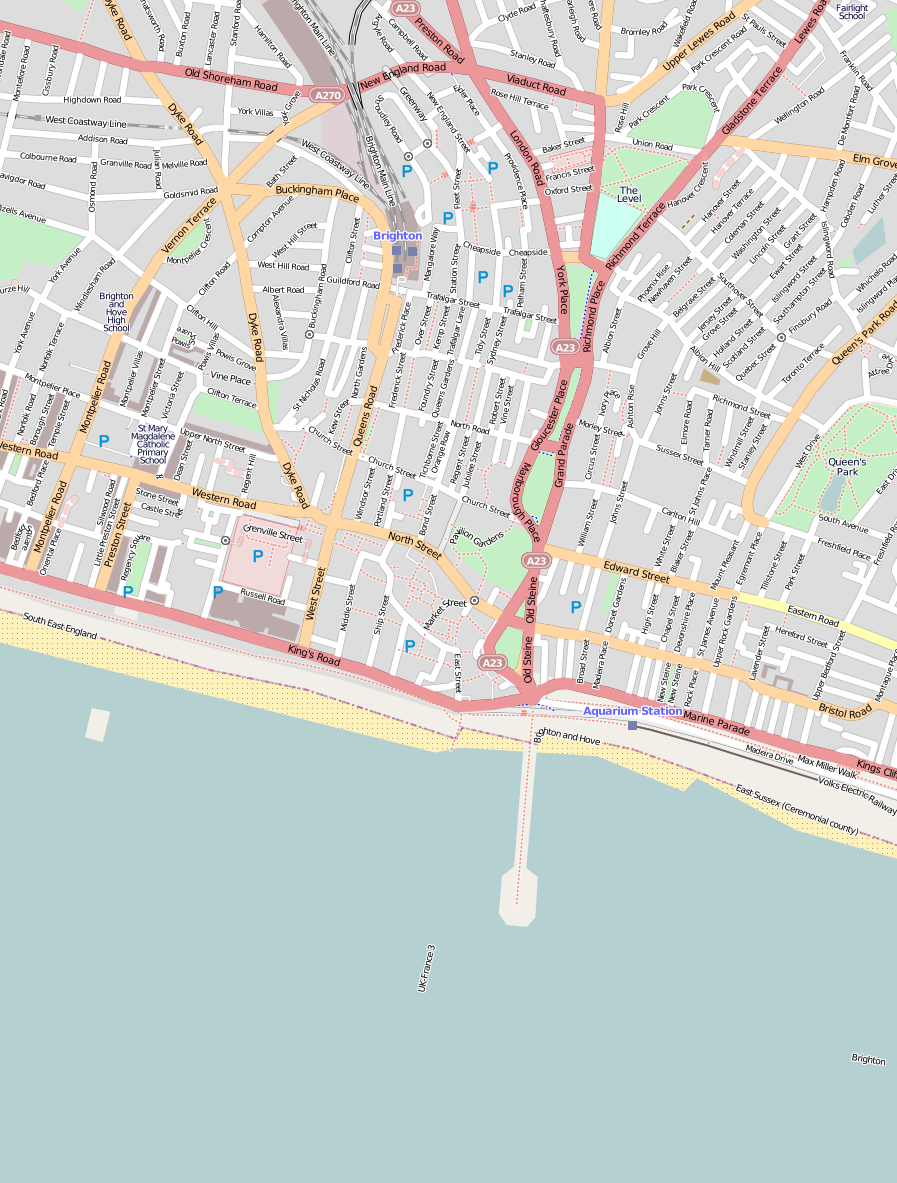
- Location in central Brighton

General information
- Location: Brighton, United Kingdom
- Coordinates: 50°49′21″N 0°09′08″W
- Opening: 1967 (original: October 1829)

Height
- Height: 168 ft (51 m)

Other information
- Number of rooms: 131

Holiday Inn Brighton is a hotel on the seafront of Brighton, England, which was formerly called the Bedford Hotel. The hotel itself, operated by Holiday Inn, only covers six floors of the 17-storey building, with the other 11 floors used for residential purposes. At a height of 51 m (167 ft), it is the 11th tallest structure in Brighton and Hove

The original hotel dated from 1829, but the current building opened in 1967.

== History ==
Pre-dating Brighton's more famous Grand Hotel by over 30 years, the Bedford opened in October 1829, having been built for William Manfield. The late Georgian-style hotel was subsequently leased to its designer, Thomas Cooper, in 1835. This arrangement lasted only until the following year, after which Manfield ran it again until 1844 when he leased it to Joseph Ellis. In 1855 Ellis purchased the hotel outright. As a fashionable hotel in a fashionable resort town, the Bedford attracted many celebrity guests and even royalty. Amongst the guests was Charles Dickens, who wrote Dombey and Son while staying at the hotel.

In 1866 the now derelict West Pier was built by Eugenius Birch; it met the seafront opposite Regency Square, very close to the hotel.

The International Gun and Polo Club, founded by George Mashall in 1874, was based in the Bedford Hotel, though the grounds were located in Preston Village, Brighton, probably at Preston Park.

The original Bedford Hotel was mentioned in the patter of the English music hall song "By the Sea", as recorded in 1910 by Mark Sheridan, who popularised the more famous "I Do Like to Be Beside the Seaside". The song was composed by Billy Williams and Fred Godfrey.

Mr. A. J. Morriss (often referred to as "AJ"), bought the hotel in 1947 and made numerous alterations and improvements to it. It is believed that his all stainless steel kitchen and utensils was the first to be installed in any hotel in England. He also had a proper sprung dance floor put in, so that they could extend the use of the dining-room. Whilst refurbishing the bedrooms, other rooms were found hidden behind fireplaces which were being dismantled.

On one evening, Morriss was attacked with a heavy hydrant key to his head by a young man who was staying at the hotel with his mother. The man had recently been discharged from a psychiatric hospital, and Morriss made medical history at the time by having brain surgery whilst still conscious – he eventually recovered, but his eyesight was greatly impaired.

Morriss sold the hotel in 1961, and by 1963 the hotel was owned by AVP Industries. In that year, there was controversy surrounding their desire to replace the building with a modern 14-storey tower block. Shortly after this, on 1 April 1964, the original building was destroyed by a fire, which also killed two people.

The hotel was rebuilt on the same site, re-opening on 16 September 1967. The 168 ft (51 m) tall, 17-storey block was designed by R. Seifert and Partners as a 127-room hotel and a section of private domestic flats, known as Bedford Towers.

As of 2007 the hotel has 131 guest rooms, a cocktail lounge and restaurant.

In 2015, the hotel had a £3 million refurbishment, in which the ground lobby was redesigned, a burger restaurant was added, and the building's façade was covered in white render.

== Architecture ==
The original hotel had five storeys with two recessed Ionic porticoes facing south and west above the entrances. Its west wing (the first part to open) was recessed from the road and decorated with giant pilasters. The interior had a Grecian hall with Ionic columns and a glazed dome.

The modern replacement building bears no resemblance to its predecessor. There is a tower with balconies on most floors in a staggered arrangement, atop a broad ground floor section; the ground floor has large windows and a covered terrace which serves as a porte-cochère.
