= Chartwell Court =

Residential tower block in Brighton, England

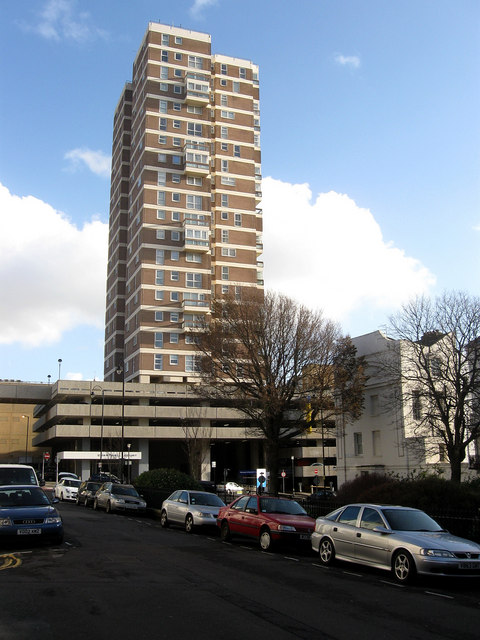

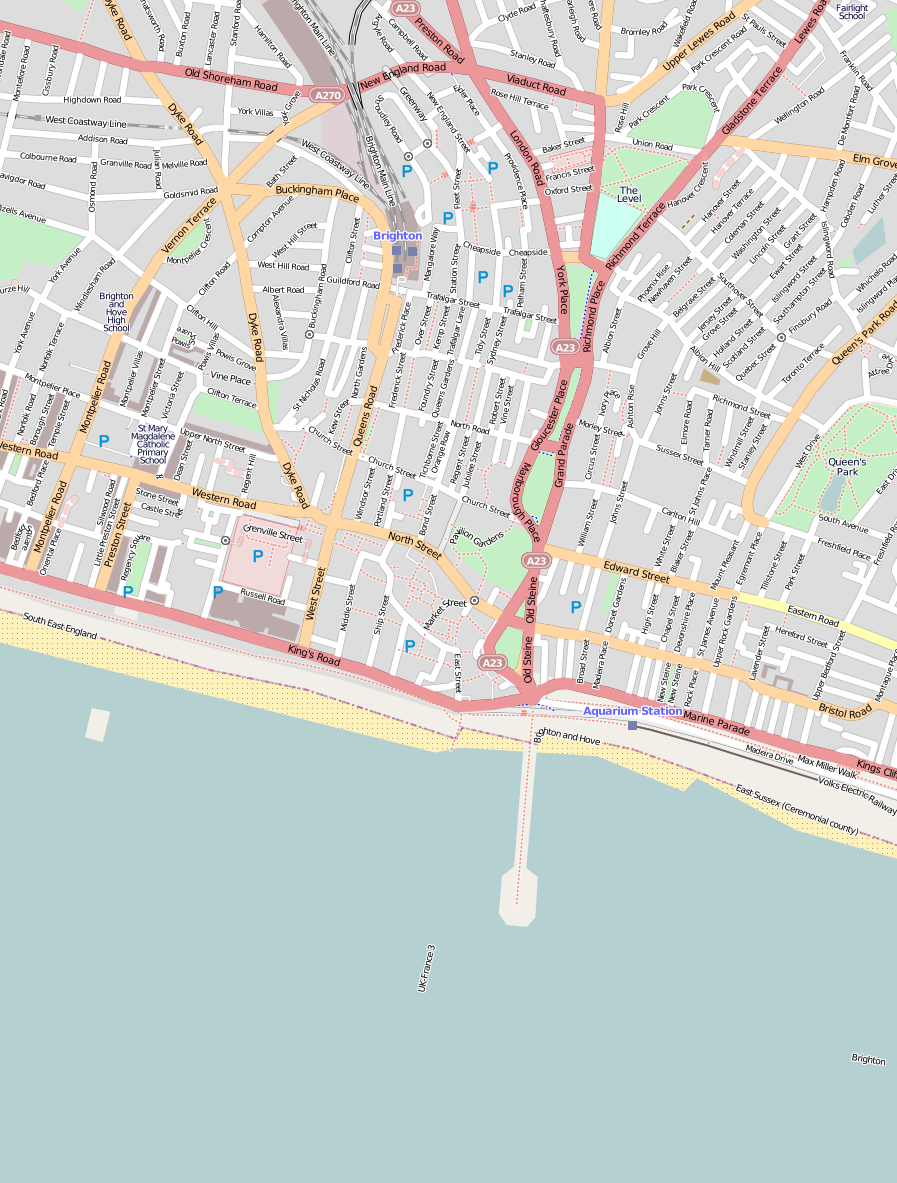
- Location within Brighton

General information
- Type: Residential tower block
- Location: BN1 2EW / 2EX, Brighton and Hove, United Kingdom
- Coordinates: 50.8229°N 0.1475°W
- Construction started: 1967
- Completed: 1968
- Owner: Churchill Square

Height
- Height: 66 m (217 ft)

Technical details
- Floor count: 18
- Lifts/elevators: 2

Design and construction
- Architect: Richard Seifert
- Architecture firm: R. Seifert & Partners

Chartwell Court is a residential tower block in the centre of Brighton, part of the city of Brighton and Hove in the United Kingdom. The tower is unusual in that is built directly on top of a car park serving the Churchill Square shopping centre. Construction work started in 1967 and continued until the following year.

At a height of 66 m (217 ft), it is the second tallest building in Brighton and Hove and amongst the tallest in the surrounding county of East Sussex. Most flats have uninterrupted sea views, and many also have views over the South Downs and the city.
