= Regency Square, Brighton =

Square in Brighton, UK

Regency Square
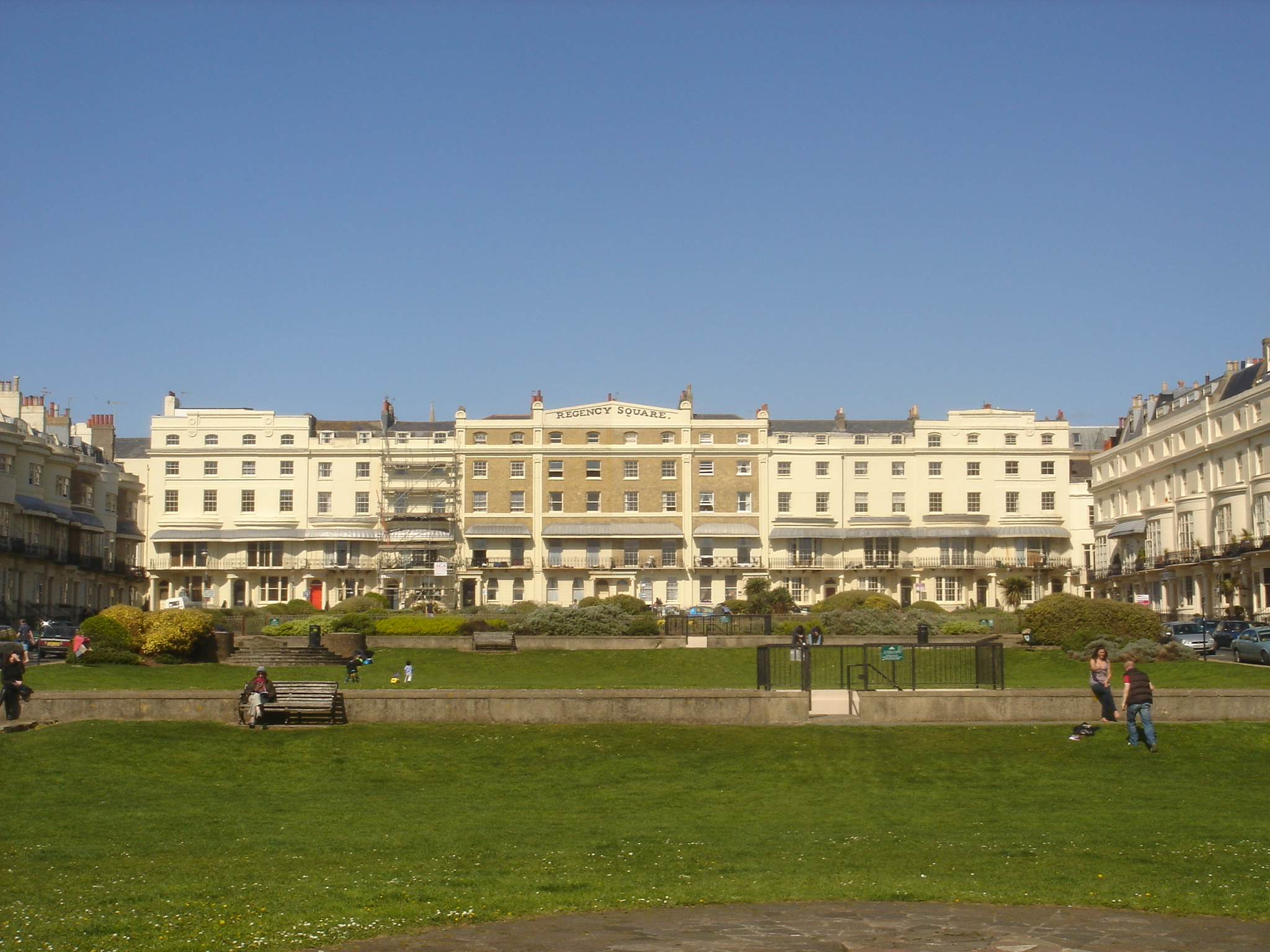
- General view of the square from the south

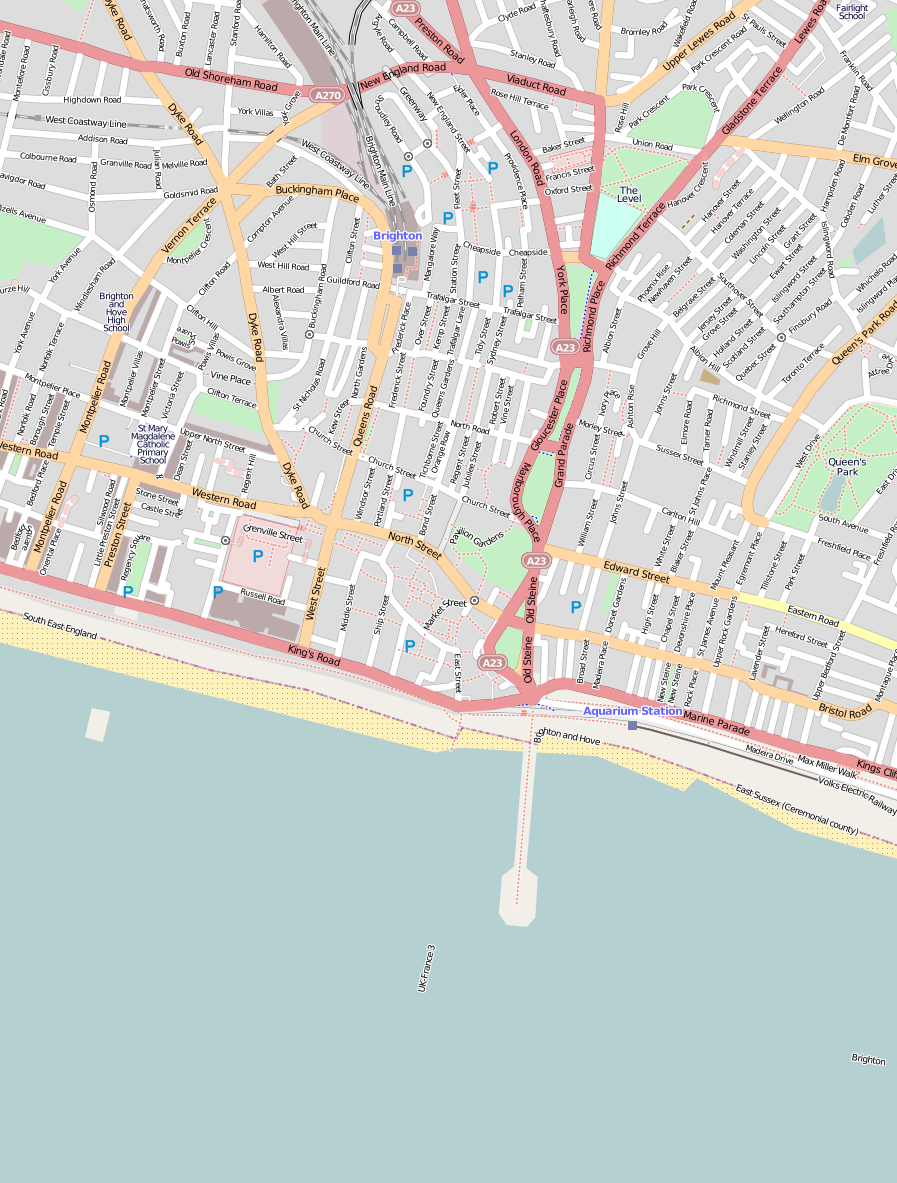
- Location within central Brighton
- 50.8226°N 0.1504°W
- Location: Regency Square, Brighton, Brighton and Hove, East Sussex, United Kingdom

History
- Built: 1818–1828
- Built for: Joshua Hanson

Site notes
- Architect(s): Amon Wilds, Amon Henry Wilds (attr.)
- Architectural style: Regency/Classical

Listed Building – Grade II*
- Official name: 2–4 Regency Square; 5–20 Regency Square; 26–37 Regency Square; 51–56 Regency Square; 57–59 Regency Square; 60–66 Regency Square; 131 King's Road
- Designated: 13 October 1952
- Reference no.: 1380802; 1380803; 1380805; 1380811; 1380812; 1380813; 1381640

Listed Building – Grade II
- Official name: 22–25 Regency Square; 38–46 Regency Square; 46a Regency Square; 46b Regency Square; 47–49 Regency Square
- Designated: 20 August 1971 (22–25, 38–46); 26 August 1999 (others)
- Reference no.: 1380804; 1380806; 1380807; 1380808; 1380809

Regency Square is a large early 19th-century residential development on the seafront in Brighton, part of the British city of Brighton and Hove. Conceived by speculative developer Joshua Hanson as Brighton underwent its rapid transformation into a fashionable resort, the three-sided "set piece" of 69 houses and associated structures was built between 1818 and 1832. Most of the houses overlooking the central garden were complete by 1824. The site was previously known, briefly and unofficially, as Belle Vue Field.

The square was a prestigious, high-class development, attracting the social elite. The central garden, originally private, has been council-owned since 1885 and publicly accessible since the Second World War. An underground car park was built beneath it in 1969.

Most of the buildings in and around the square have been designated listed buildings—47 houses are each listed at Grade II*, the second-highest designation, while 18 other houses, a war memorial, a nearby inn and a set of bollards outside it have each been given the lower Grade II status. The house at the southwest corner is now numbered as part of King's Road but was built as part of Regency Square, and is also Grade II*-listed.

== History ==
=== Belle Vue Field ===
Regency Square was built on one of the fields to the west of the town but within the parish of Brighton. The field was briefly and unofficially known as Belle Vue Field after it was acquired by Francis Hanson, the owner of the nearby Belle Vue House, in the late 1790s.

Belle Vue House was built near to a windmill known as West Mill. The windmill was owned by Matthew Bourne in 1744, but was not marked on Ogilby's 1762 map, although a windmill is shown on Lambert's View of Brighthelmstone which is dated 1765. In the 1790s, the windmill was owned by John Streeter. On 28 March 1797, when 86 oxen dragged it 2 miles (3.2 km) uphill on a sled to the nearby village of Preston. It was re-erected there and renamed Preston Mill. After several more renamings, it was demolished in 1881. Its machinery was cannibalised by the owners of nearby Waterhall Mill. A watercolour painting, now displayed at Preston Manor, shows crowds of people watching the mill's removal to Preston.

By the late 18th century, Brighthelmstone (as it was originally known) had begun to develop into a fashionable coastal resort. When the annual town fair could no longer be accommodated on its traditional site in the Old Town, Belle Vue Field was used as one of several temporary locations.

Belle Vue Field is sometimes said to have been the site, in 1793, of a 10,000-man military encampment. However, Belle Vue Field did not yet exist in 1793 and contemporaneous sources show that the encampment occupied a much wider area of land, extending as far as the boundary with the neighbouring parish of Hove. Jane Austen refers to the encampment in her novel Pride and Prejudice (written in 1796 and published in 1813). The heroine Elizabeth Bennet's sister is invited to Brighton and elopes with, and later marries, army officer George Wickham. The annual military encampments moved to other sites in and around Brighthelmstone in subsequent years.

=== Hanson builds the square ===
In 1818, the field was acquired by Francis Hanson's son, Joshua Flesher Hanson, a businessman. By this time, Brighton's profile was such that speculators were commissioning architects and builders to design and lay out sea-facing residential developments to attract wealthy long-term visitors or permanent residents. Royal Crescent, New Steine and Bedford Square were already in existence; Clarence Square, Russell Square and Marine Parade were being developed.

Hanson's plan for Regency Square was on a much larger scale than these developments. He divided Belle Vue Field into 69 plots, leased them individually and put strict covenants in place, demanding that each house be built in a specific style in order to ensure architectural harmony. In return, the leaseholders (mostly private builders) would have the right to buy, and would end up with houses much larger than average for the town, with excellent sea views and exclusive access to the large central garden. Most leaseholders bought the houses as soon as they could, which was to Hanson's advantage as he made money and had no ongoing responsibility for the buildings. Restrictions in the covenants included the requirement to erect a façade with an iron balcony, to clad the area below the balcony in stucco, to paint the façade at least every three years, to repair any damage, and to pay towards maintenance of the central garden. No stucco was to be applied above the balcony line.

The covenants included a requirement to form a residents' committee, whose job it was to ensure the covenants were obeyed and to impose a levy on the occupiers of the houses to pay for the upkeep of the garden.

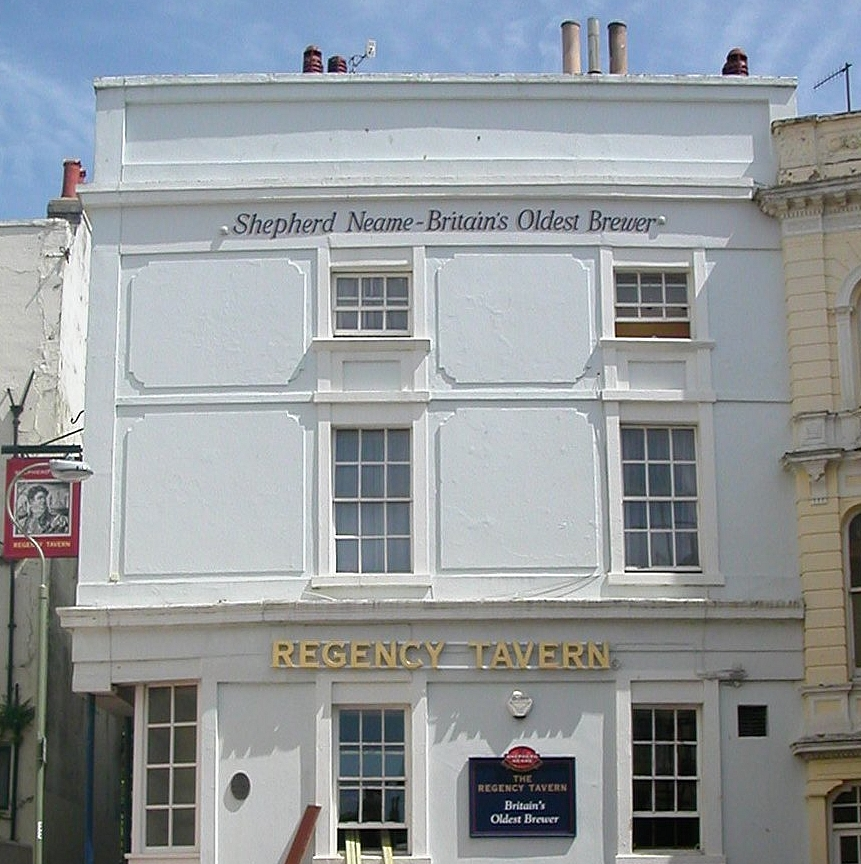
Regency Tavern stands at the northeastern corner of the square

Although there is no documentary evidence confirming the architects, most sources attribute Regency Square's buildings to the father-and-son partnership of Amon and Amon Henry Wilds, who moved to Brighton from nearby Lewes in 1815 and became two of Brighton's most important architects; they were extremely prolific, and were responsible for defining and developing the town's distinctive Regency style. Although they worked extensively with fellow architect Charles Busby during the 1820s, historians agree that he was not involved in Regency Square, at least not in its early stages: the buildings "appear to lack his distinctive flair" and are not as impressive as those at the Kemp Town estate to the east of Brighton, which all three men were involved with. No. 1 Regency Square (now 131 Kings Road) is confirmed as the work of Amon Henry Wilds. Some evidence points to William Mackie being involved in the design of houses on the east side of the square.

Building work started in 1818 and continued until 1832, with most of the houses complete by 1824. A passageway (Regency Colonnade) was built at the northeast corner to connect the square to the neighbouring development of Russell Square. The Regency Tavern has occupied most of the passageway since the 1870s, all of it since 1939. St Margaret's Church, an Anglican chapel of ease designed in the Greek Revival/Neoclassical style in 1824 by Busby, was the local place of worship.

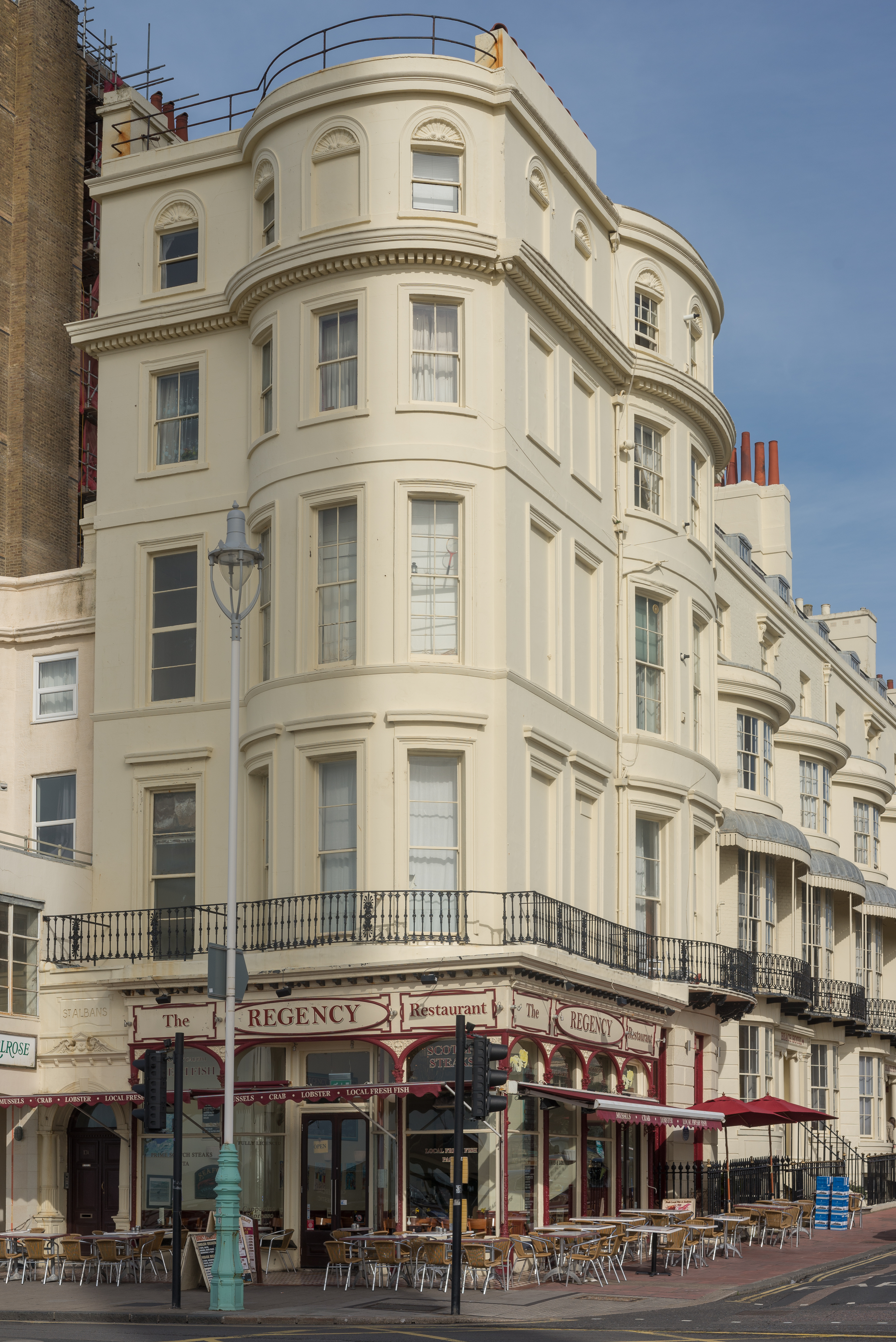
131 King's Road was formerly known as 1 Regency Square and St Albans House

In 1866 the West Pier, designed by Eugenius Birch, was built opposite the square's central garden.

Unusually, Hanson had set a 71-year time limit on the covenants rather than granting them in perpetuity, and on 25 December 1889 they were due to expire. Among other things, residents would then lose their rights to use the gardens. The residents committee, led by solicitor Somers Clarke (unrelated to the Brighton-born architect of that name), attempted unsuccessfully to purchase the gardens and extend the covenants by an Act of Parliament; two years later, the passing of the Brighton Improvement Act 1884 achieved the same aims. Brighton Corporation took ownership of the gardens, and householders signed new deeds confirming they wished for the covenants relating to their houses to be extended indefinitely.

=== 20th century ===
From the beginning, Regency Square was a prestigious, high-class development, and it is still considered to be "one of Brighton's best sea-facing squares". By the mid-20th century most of the houses had become hotels, but the majority have since been converted into flats and the square today is overwhelmingly residential. In early 1963 a surface-level car park was planned for the Brighton Corporation owned central garden; this was changed to a 520-space underground car park, created in 1967-9 using the cut and cover method in which the garden was dug up, the car park with roof constructed, and the lawns and flowerbeds restored.

Richard Seifert's 334-foot (102 m), Modernist 24-storey residential block, Sussex Heights, was built in 1968 on land immediately to the east of the square, and was criticised for affecting the character of the square because of its contrasting style and height.

During the early 1970s the hotels sought permission from Brighton Corporation to erect neon signs advertising themselves; after negotiation with the Regency Society, a Brighton-wide conservation group formed in 1945, the corporation made the square and the surrounding area into a conservation area in 1973. Conservation area status gives the council firmer control over planning permission and changes to buildings or street furniture, especially in respect of their effect on "the character and appearance of the area". The original conservation area has since been enlarged twice to its present size of 80 acres (32 ha).

== Architecture ==
Almost all buildings in Regency Square have been designated a Listed building: 47 houses are each listed at Grade II*, while 18 other houses, a memorial, an inn and a set of bollards, have each been given the lower Grade II status. The house at the south west corner is now numbered as part of King's Road, but was built as part of Regency Square and is also Grade II*-listed.

The five Grade II* parts of the square, including the house at the south west corner (formerly St Albans House), were listed on 13 October 1952.

The entire west side was listed in 1952: St Albans House, the three houses at numbers 2–4 and the sixteen houses at number 5-20. The northern side's central section, numbers 26–37, forms another Grade II* listing. On the east side, all of the surviving original houses, at numbers 51–56, 57–59 and 60–66, are listed at Grade II*. Apart from St Albans House, all of these listings include iron railings attached to the exterior.

Numbers 22–25 and 38–46, on the north side, were listed at Grade II on 20 August 1971, while most of the rest of the square's original houses were listed at the same grade on 26 August 1999: numbers 46a, 46b and 47–49. All listings except numbers 46a and 46b include attached railings. The listing for numbers 38–46 includes a carriage arch, which has nonetheless been lost.

A small block of flats, Abbotts, stands at the southeast corner of the square. Built by architecture firm Fitzroy Robinson & Partners in 1961–62, it replaced three of the original Regency Square houses (nos. 67–69) which, along with the neighbouring property at 129 Kings Road, had been converted into a hotel of the same name in the early part of the 20th century. The original four houses were considered "quite good" by architectural historian Nikolaus Pevsner.

=== Grade II* listings ===
2–4 Regency Square

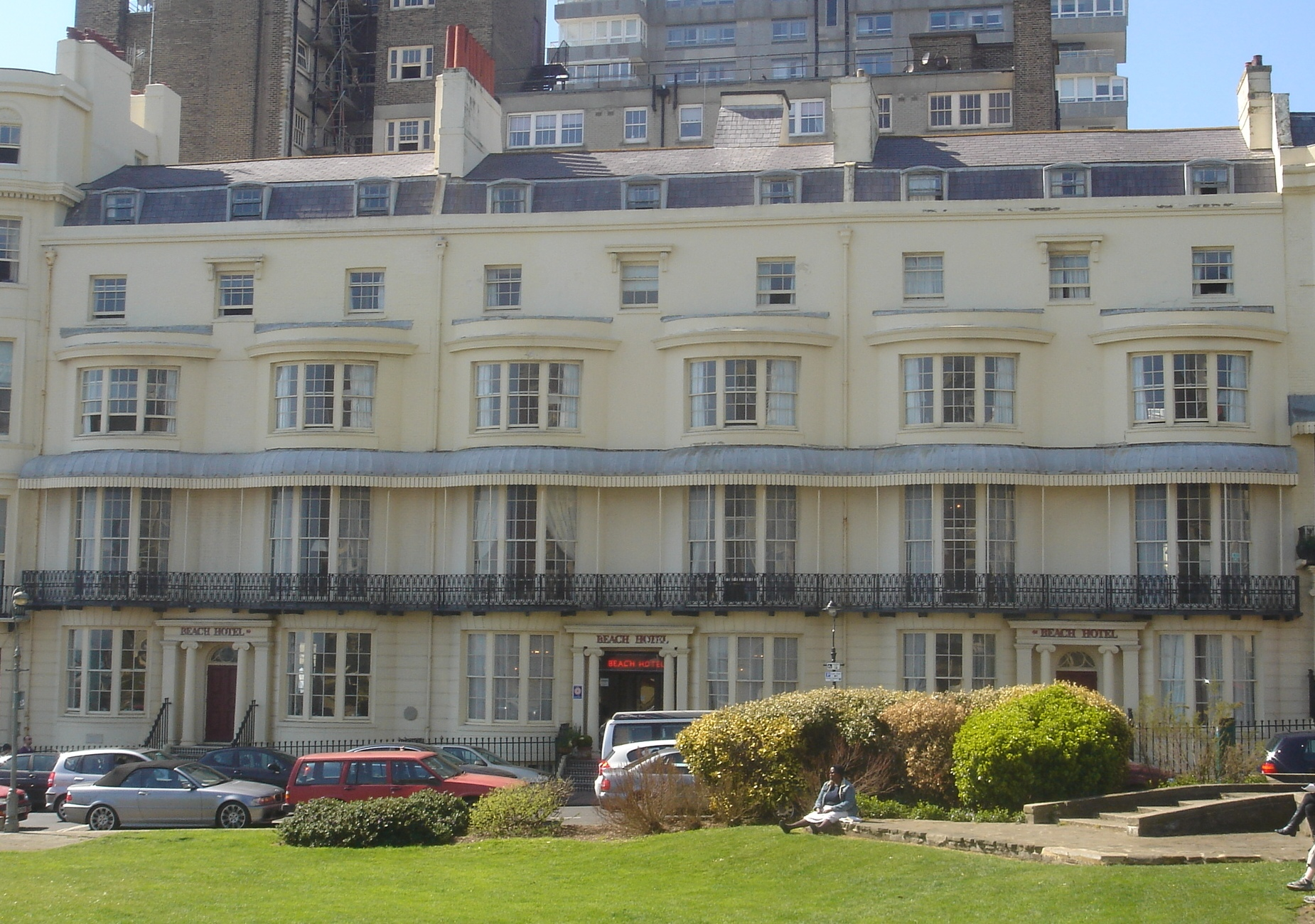
2–4 Regency Square

These three four-storey houses (now the Beach Hotel) have double bow fronts, and were considered by Nikolaus Pevsner to be more austere in their detailing than most Brighton houses of their era. Number 2, a former home of social reformer William King (whose two-year stay is commemorated by a blue plaque), is built of brick which has been painted over; the others are stuccoed. Each house also has a basement and a dormer window. The ground floors are rusticated and have arched doorways set into Classical-style porches with both Ionic and Doric columns—the latter in the form of antae. The tripartite bay windows are neither full-height nor continuous: only the first three storeys have them, and they are offset to the right on the first and second floors. The first-floor windows sit between a curved cast-iron balcony and a verandah-style canopy supported on decorative brackets. On each house, the third floor has three small flat-arched sash windows; the centre window sits below a small cornice supported on corbels.

5–20 Regency Square

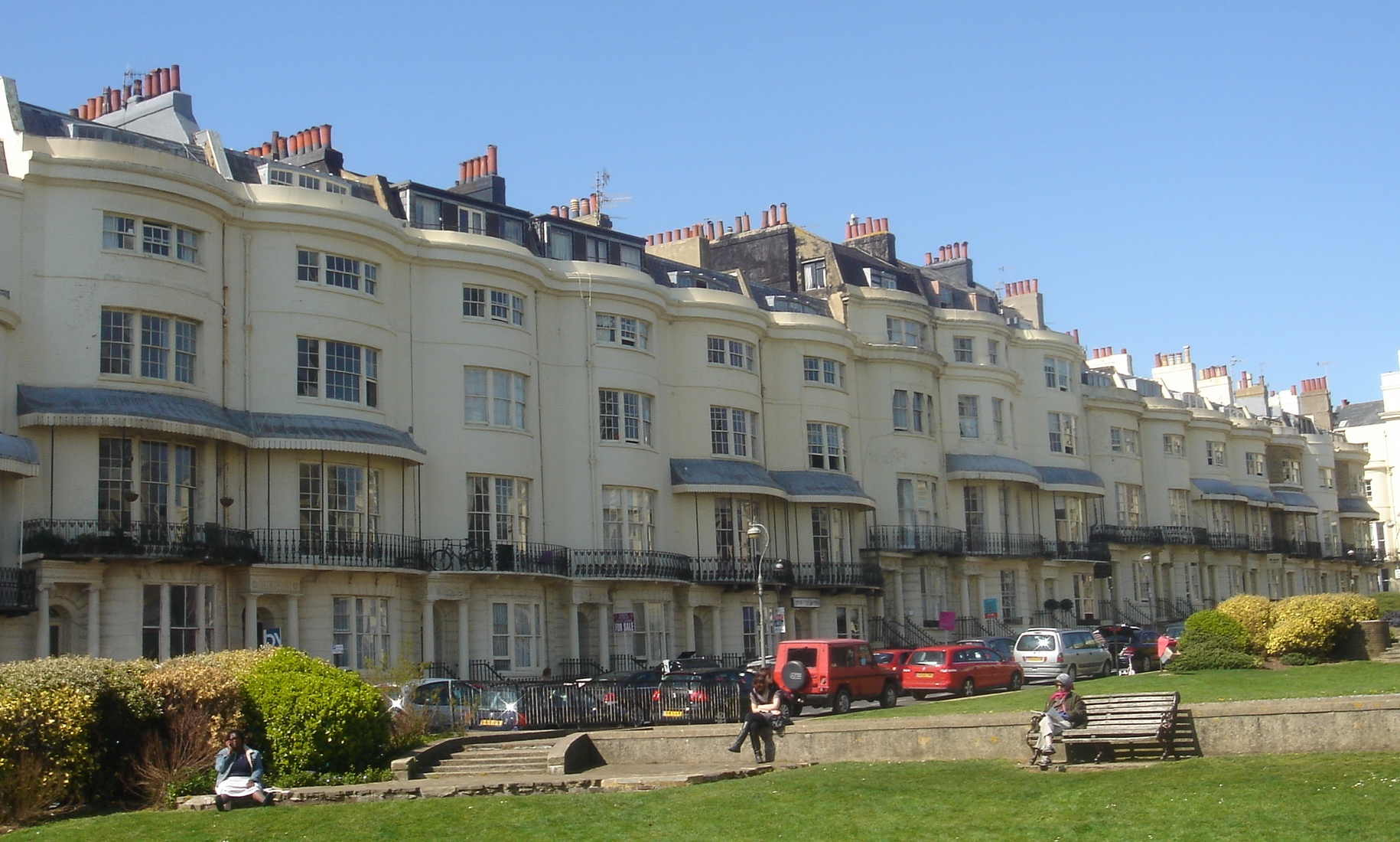
5–20 Regency Square

These sixteen houses form the greater part of the square's west side. Although there are differences in height and detail between individual houses, they were designed at the same time and maintain "the longstanding tradition of the terraced townhouse" which had been developed "by Henry Holland [...] in his own speculative enterprises at Hans Town and Sloane Street, London". Numbers 7, 8, 11 and 15 are entirely stuccoed; number 18 retains its original unpainted yellow-brick upper façade; and all other houses have painted brick to their upper storeys and stuccoed ground floors with rustication. The roofs are mansard-style and laid with slate. Each house has dormer windows; numbers 5–13 inclusive rise to four storeys, while the other seven houses are one storey shorter. All houses except number 12 have a single bay window, mostly in tripartite form. Number 12 has three windows to each floor. The entrance porches, reached via staircases, are either Doric or Ionic in form, with columns and entablatures. They have arch-headed doorways set into them. Small cast-iron balconies run across the terrace at first-floor level (although number 5's has been lost), and some houses have canopy-style verandahs as well. A nearly continuous cornice (absent on numbers 13 and 19) spans the terrace; some houses also have a second cornice above this. Several houses have fanlights with coloured glass, and other non-standard details include decorative stucco panelling at number 5; paterae (circular motifs), triglyph-decorated friezes and other Classical-style ornamentation in some of the porch entablatures; original window-guards of iron; a blocked doorway flanked by pilasters at number 20; and many original sash windows.

26–37 Regency Square

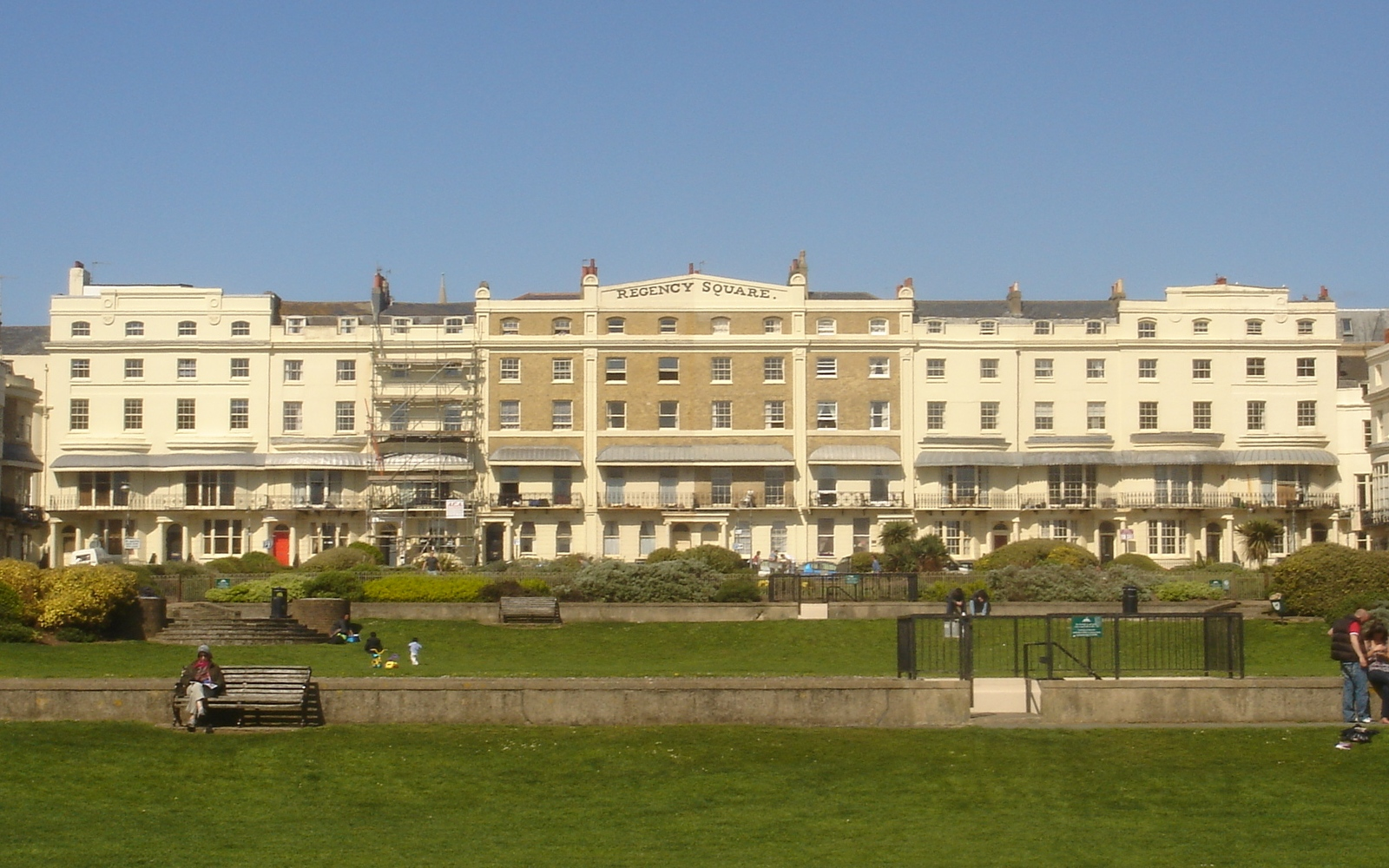
26–37 Regency Square

These 12 houses, arranged along the sea-facing north side in the form of two wings flanking a four-house centrepiece, are the focal point of the square, forming "a kind of palace front" topped with a pediment displaying Regency Square in prominent black lettering. Pevsner described this feature as "not [being] enough of an accent to pull the square together". The terrace is a five-part composition: the end "wings" (formed by numbers 26–27 and 36–37) are of four storeys, stuccoed and with tall parapets pinched upwards to form small pediments; the central section (numbers 30–33), also of four storeys and built in yellow brick, and topped with the inscribed pediment; and numbers 28–29 and 34–35, rising to three storeys and forming a link between the central and outer sections. Numbers 30–33 have a two-window range, rather than the single window on each of the other houses, and have four pilasters running the full height of the façade and terminating at the parapet in circular antefixae. The entrance porches are of the Ionic order. Each house has a canopied cast-iron balcony at first-floor level. There is rusticated decoration at ground-floor level.

51–56 Regency Square

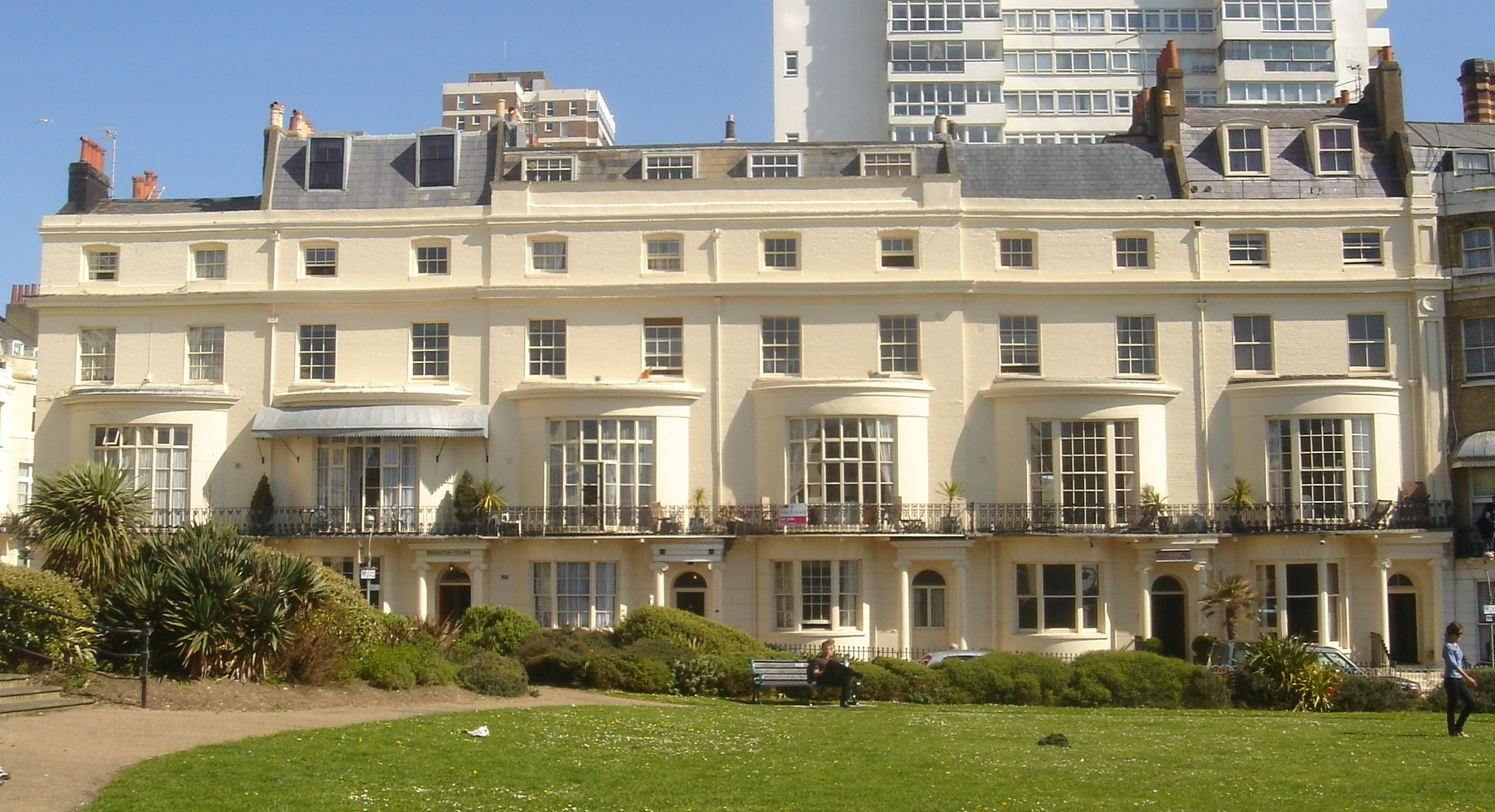
51–56 Regency Square with Sussex Heights behind

The east side of Regency Square is architecturally less consistent than either the north or west sides. Numbers 51–56 were designed as a symmetrical composition: the two houses at the centre stand forward slightly and have a more prominent pediment. Each house has four storeys and a single bay window on the ground and first floors; other common features include rustication on the ground floor and Ionic-style porches with recessed flat-arched doorways and arched fanlights. There are cast-iron balconies at first-floor level; number 52's has a canopy above it. Some windows are sashes, and numbers 52, 53, 54 and 56 have dormer windows in their slate roofs.

57–59 Regency Square

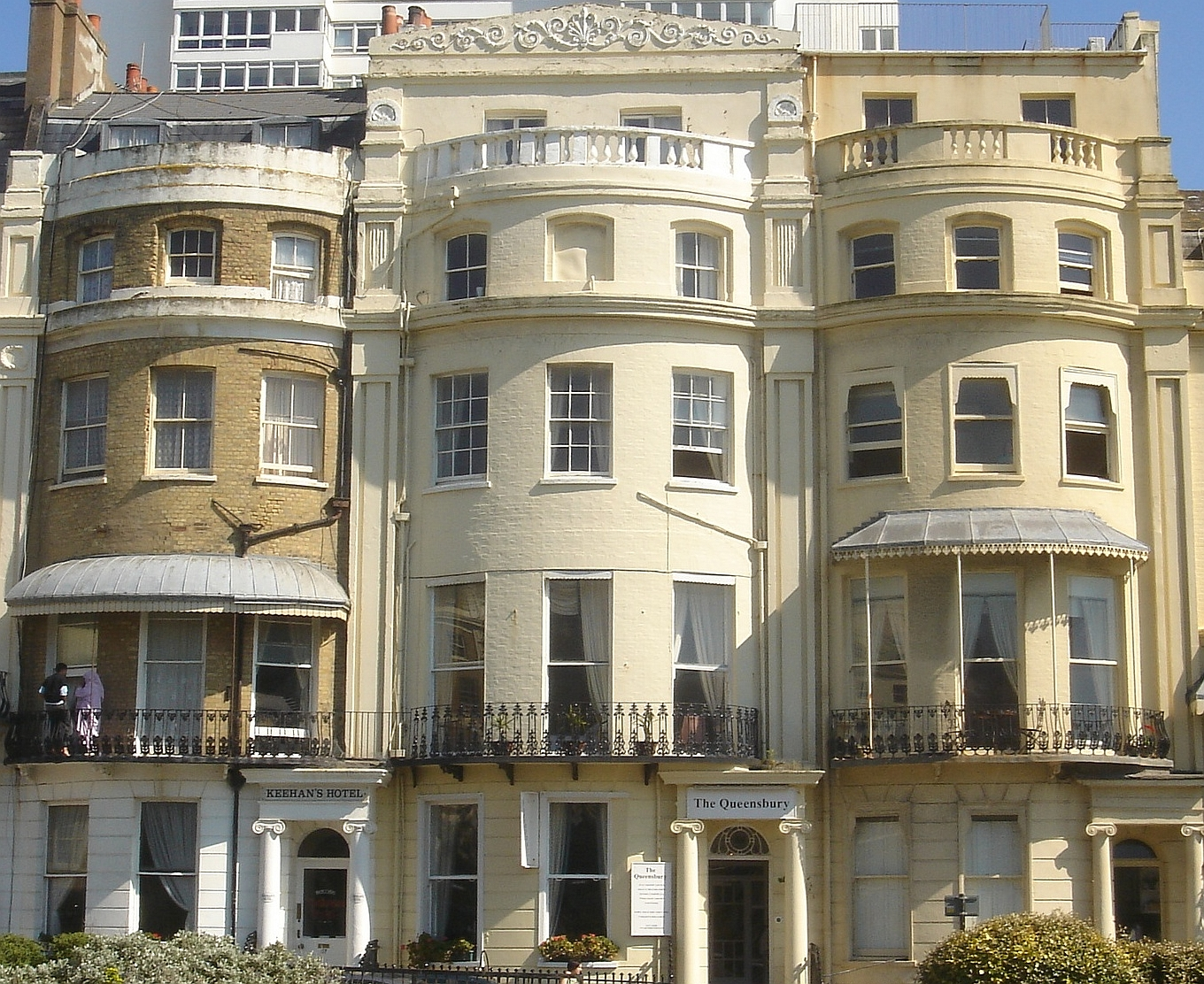
57–59 Regency Square

These three houses may also have been designed as a single composition, but this effect has been lost. Numbers 58 and 59 are of five storeys; number 57 has four storeys and dormer windows. The parapet rises into an intricately decorated pediment above number 58, with palmette scrollwork and semicircular antefixae. Each house has an Ionic-columned porch with a straight-headed door and semicircular fanlight. Numbers 57 and 59 have canopies and first-floor balconies; number 58 has only a balcony. The three houses are the only ones on the east side to have full-height bows, and number 57 is unique on that side in retaining its original unpainted yellow-brick façade.

60–66 Regency Square

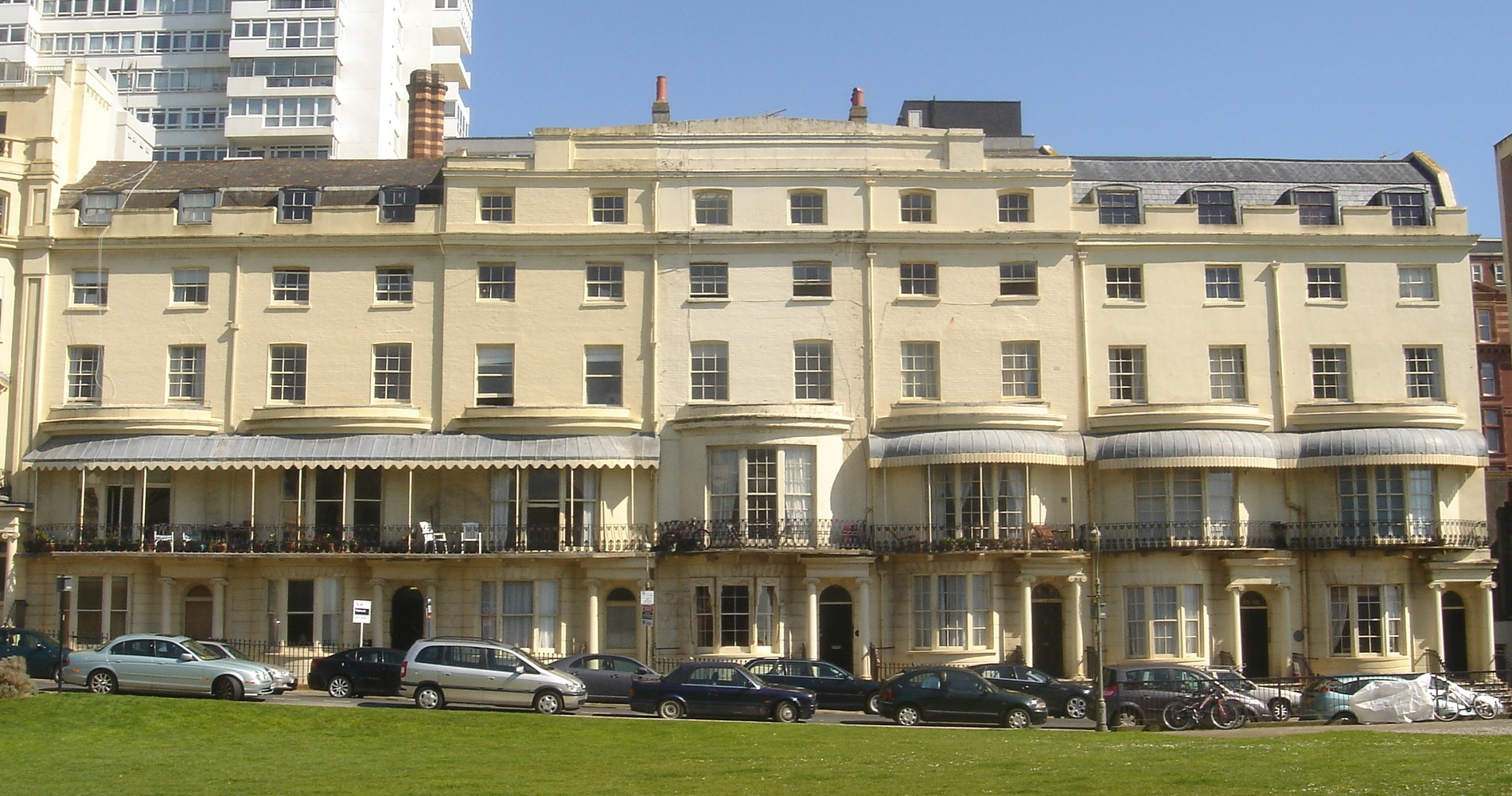
60–66 Regency Square

These seven houses are also a symmetrical composition: the three in the middle are set forward and have a tall parapet topped by a very shallow pediment. Like the rest of the east side, the houses have Ionic porches with flat-arched doors and round-headed fanlights. The ground and first floors have three-part bay windows topped with cornices. Except on number 63, a narrow canopy sits between the first-floor window and the cornice. Another cornice spans the full width of the terrace above third-floor level. The slightly recessed houses on each end (numbers 60–61 and 65–66) have pairs of dormer windows.

131 King's Road

The former St Albans House was designed in 1828 by Amon Henry Wilds alone and was fitted out by William Izard. A shopfront was fitted in the early 20th century, and the ground floor has housed a restaurant since 1930. Contemporary with the shopfront was the round-headed entrance on the King's Road elevation, with an archway supported on fluted columns, a dentil-patterned cornice and ornamentation including scrollwork and a panel inscribed St Albans. The building has five storeys, three windows facing King's Road and the sea, and a five-window range to Regency Square. It is stuccoed and slate-roofed. The shopfront is topped by a thin cast-iron balcony. The right-hand (east) side of the King's Road façade has a full-height tripartite segmental bay window with architraves to each window. The Regency Square elevation also has a three-light full-height bay window; all other windows are blocked.

=== Grade II listings ===
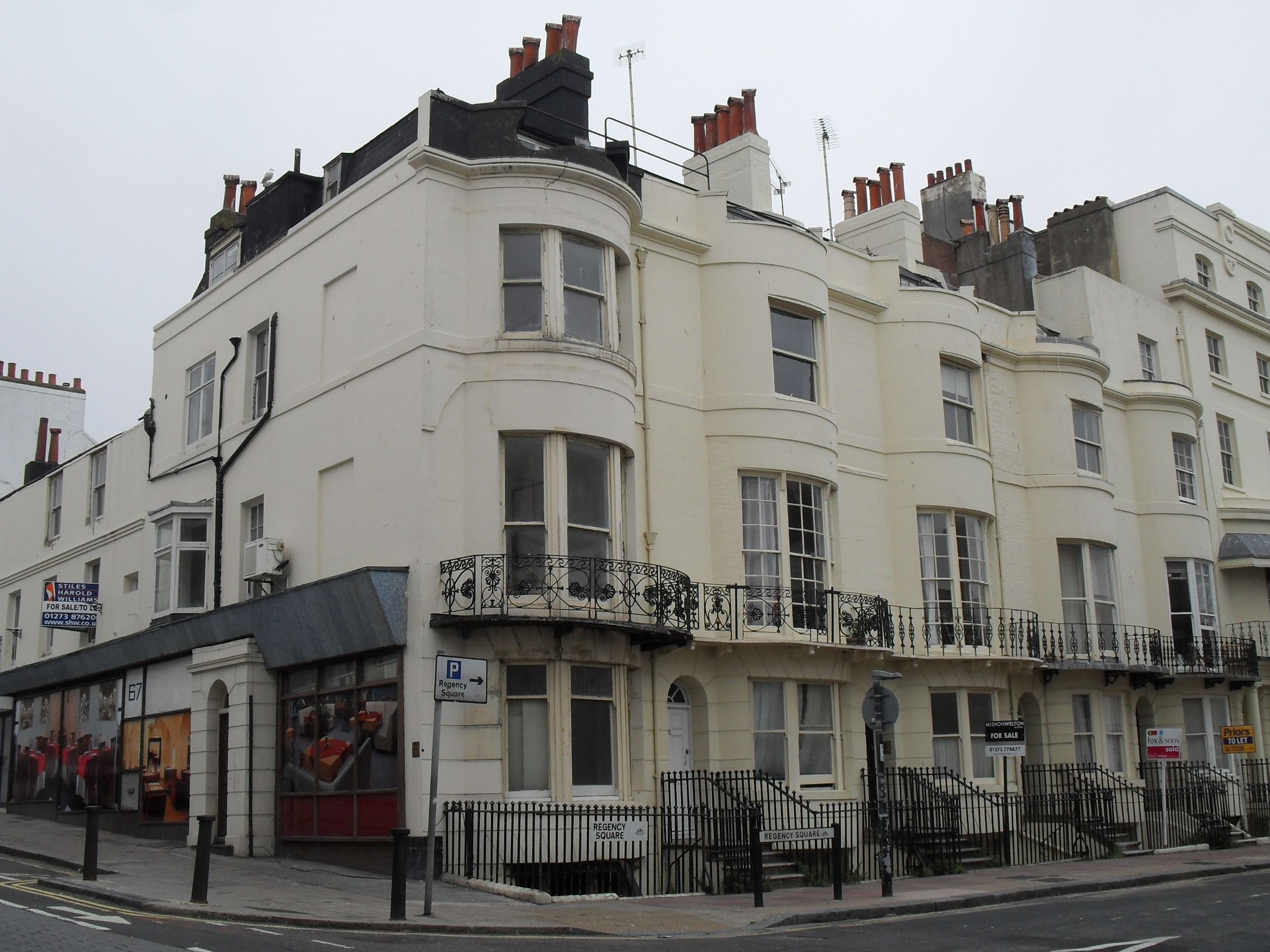
22–25 Regency Square

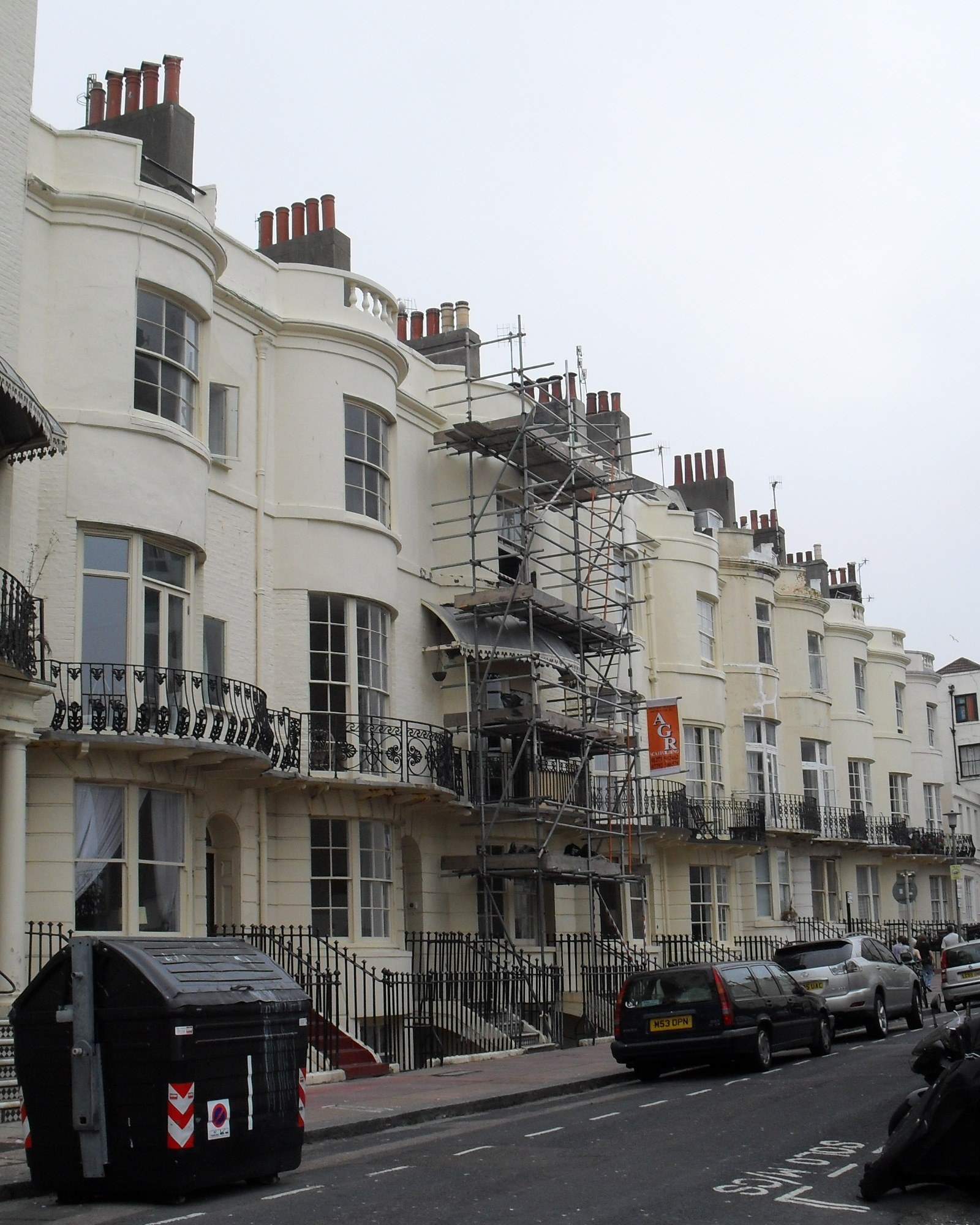
38–46 Regency Square

22–25 Regency Square

Numbers 22–25 Regency Square—at the northwest corner of the square on a short road leading to Preston Street—include the building (number 67) on the corner of that street, which absorbed the house built as number 21 Regency Square. These bow-fronted terraced houses were built in the early 1820s. Number 67 Preston Street is of three storeys and has a shopfront facing west into that street; alongside that is a porch with rusticated decoration and an arched doorway. The Regency Square (south) façade has blocked windows at first- and second-floor level. The four houses facing Regency Square are of three storeys, except number 25 which also has an attic storey. They are of brick faced with painted stucco. Each house has a chimney on its slate roof. Each has an entrance staircase with iron railings, a rusticated ground floor, a single bay window to each storey, an iron balcony at first-floor level, a cornice and a parapet in front of the roof. At numbers 22 to 24, dormer windows cut through the parapet.

38–46 Regency Square

Numbers 38–46 Regency Square run alongside the northeast side, and are contemporary with the houses at the northwest corner. A carriage arch ran between numbers 42 and 43. Together with numbers 22–25 and the Grade II*-listed centrepiece of numbers 26–37, the houses form an approximately symmetrical three-part arrangement when viewed from the south. Each house is of stucco-clad brick, and all but number 40 have slate-covered roofs. All houses rise to three storeys and have dormer windows; number 43 has two bay windows on each floor (except the ground floor, where the space is taken up by the carriage arch), but the other houses have only one. Each house also has a balcony, a cornice and a parapet (topped with a balustrade in some cases).

46a Regency Square

Number 46a Regency Square stands partly in the square and partly in the passageway opposite the Regency Tavern. It is thought to have been the last property to be completed. Originally built as a single storey architect's studio, it acquired an upper storey in the 1960s and is now a two-storey stucco-faced cottage with three windows on the first floor and a fourth in a recessed wing on the east side. The flat roof sits behind a parapet. The ground floor has a broad single window flanked by decorative panels. A cornice runs between the two storeys, and projects forward over the right-aligned entrance.

46b Regency Square

Number 46b Regency Square is squeezed into a narrow corner between number 47 and the Regency Tavern. It has three storeys, a single-window range and much ornamentation. The ground floor is a 20th-century alteration. Above it, pilasters with banded rustication rise to the level of the parapet. They are broken at second-floor level by a small balcony with balustrades. The window above this has a round arch, a moulded archivolt, a keystone with acanthus decoration and thin pilasters topped with capitals in the form of leaves.

47–49 Regency Square

Numbers 47–49 Regency Square are noticeably different from the rest of the square. All three have a single canted bay window to each of three storeys, topped with an architrave supported on pilasters with capitals. However, the canted bay windows are late 19th century alterations. When built in 1832, the houses were variously bow-windowed or flat fronted. Each house also has a cornice and parapet. Number 47's doorway is straight-headed, but the other two houses have round-arched entrances.

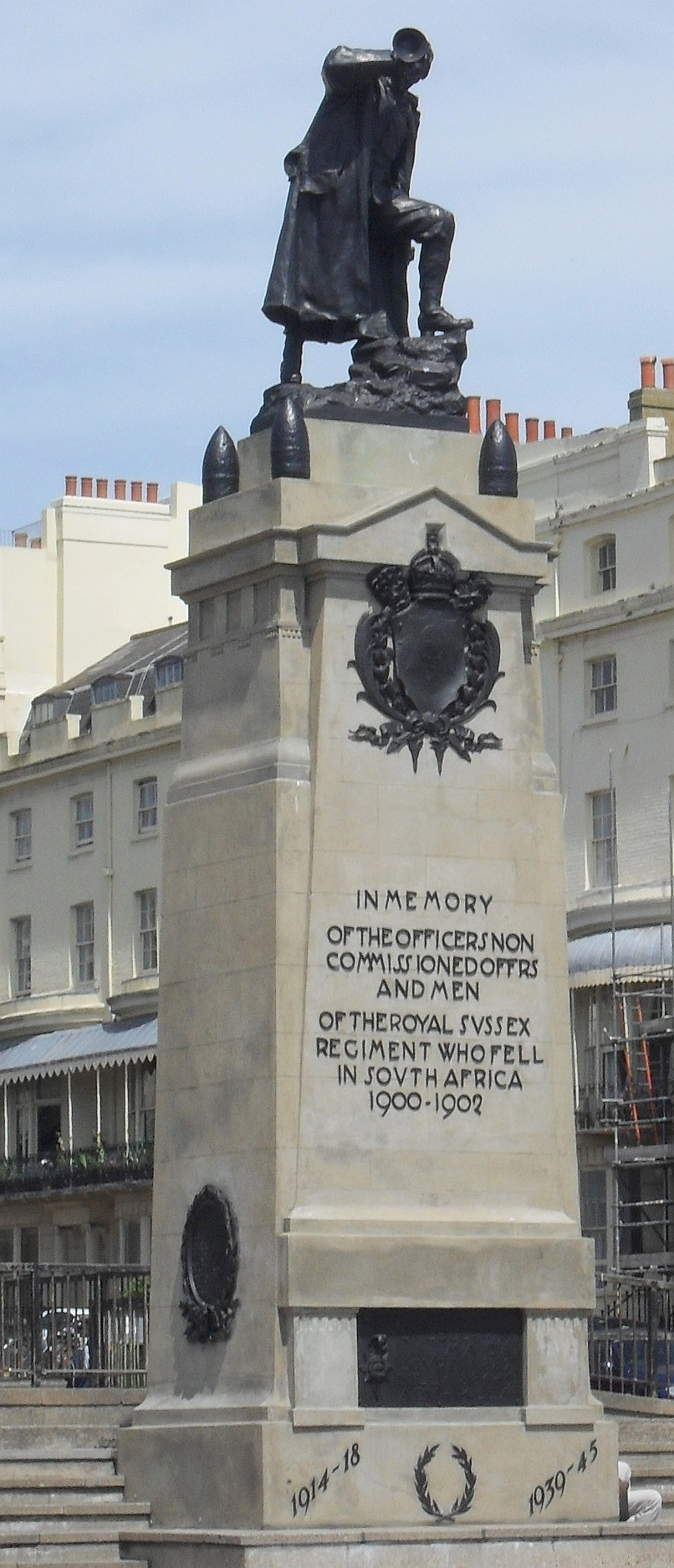
Sir John Simpson's South African War Memorial

War memorial

The South African War Memorial commemorating 152 members of the Royal Sussex Regiment who died in the Second Boer War stands at the south end of Regency Square's garden, facing King's Road and the sea. It was erected in 1904, and takes the form of a square pedestal topped by an entablature and pediment. Originally of Portland stone with some bronze and stucco, the bronze parts have now been obscured. A bronze trumpeter stands on top of the entablature. Local architect Sir John Simpson designed the memorial and Charles Hartwell sculpted it. The memorial's unveiling ceremony, conducted by William Nevill, 1st Marquess of Abergavenny, was on 29 October 1904.

Regency Tavern

The Regency Tavern's main façade faces north into the passageway leading to Russell Square, and has a six-window range. The side wall, facing into Regency Square, has two windows to each of the three storeys. The frontage is assumed to be mostly original, although it was built, in 1829, as a row of three individual houses, which merged into a single establishment in two phases in the late 19th and mid 20th centuries. The frontage has been augmented by modern iron columns. All but one of the windows are original sashes; those on the first floor of the Regency Square elevation have architraves which join the sill of the second-floor window directly above. There are stuccoed panels between these windows as well, and some of the north-facing windows also have panelling in their spandrels. A tall parapet rises above the cornice.

Bollards

Two cast-iron bollards in the passageway outside the Regency Tavern are also listed at Grade II. They were erected in the mid-19th century, and are fluted along their length. One has the name of its local founder at the bottom. On 31 December 2012, one was broken and was replaced with a smaller plain bollard instead of a facsimile, causing controversy locally.

== Social aspects ==
Regency Square was a prestigious, high-class development, attracting the social elite. The square gradually lost its prestige status after World War I as hotels started to move in. Although most of the houses had become hotels by the mid-20th century, the majority have since been converted into flats and the square today is overwhelmingly residential.

Military bands gave a performance in the garden in 1831 and 1849, and again in 1904 at the unveiling of the Royal Sussex Regiment Memorial, but the residents' committees strove to ensure that the garden was mainly a quiet space for residents. In the 1890s, temporary tennis courts were marked out on the lawn. During World War II air-raid shelters were built on the square and an underground car park was built beneath it in 1969.

Number 1 Regency Square, later known as St Albans House and now numbered 131 King's Road, is "historically the most interesting house in the square". Amon Henry Wilds designed and built it in 1829, William Izard laid out the interior. The house was one of the most important social venues in Brighton between 1830 and the Duchess's death in 1837. She was born Harriet Mellon in 1777, became an actress, married banker Thomas Coutts in 1815, and inherited his fortune when he died in 1822—thereby becoming England's richest woman. After being courted by many men, she met and married William Beauclerk, the 9th Duke of St Albans, and they became regular visitors to Brighton. From 1830, their prolonged stays at No. 1 Regency Square were so frequent that it was named St Albans House. For the next seven years, it was the venue for lavish balls and extensive feasts, with hundreds of upper-class guests. The Duke was the Grand Falconer of England and occasionally displayed his falcons in the Regency Square garden. St Albans House had a nearby riding school which supposedly had the second largest unsupported interior space and the second largest dome in England, behind Westminster Abbey and St Paul's Cathedral respectively. (Part of the Bedford Hotel now occupies the site.)

Two other famous characters paid an unintentional visit to Regency Square at the end of the 19th century: Oscar Wilde and his lover Lord Alfred Douglas crashed their horse and carriage into the railings of the gardens. Local newspapers reported the story with interest, but Wilde dismissed it as "an accident of no importance"—possibly a punning allusion to one of his best-known plays.

Some of Regency Square's buildings are currently hotels. The Beach Hotel occupies numbers 2–4, the three houses north of St Albans House. Hotel Pelirocco occupies numbers 9 and 10; Hotel 360 is at number 12; and the West Pier Hotel (at numbers 14–15) and Topps Hotel (numbers 16–18) also occupy the west side of the square. There are three hotels on the north side: the Regency at number 28, the Prince Regent at number 29, and the Artist Residence at number 33. The east side has Adelaide House (number 51), Brighton House (number 52), Hotel Una (numbers 55–56), and the Queensbury Hotel (number 58).
