= Latest TV =

Television channel in Brighton, United Kingdom

- Country: United Kingdom
- Broadcast area: Brighton

Programming
- Language: English

Ownership
- Owner: The Latest

History
- Launched: 28 August 2014; 11 years ago

Links
- Website: thelatest.co.uk

Availability

Terrestrial
- Freeview: Channel 8

Latest TV is the local television service for Brighton, England, owned by The Latest. The station is available on Freeview channel 8 from the Whitehawk Hill transmitting station from its own local multiplex.

== History ==
The Latest had already operated an online television station in 2012, when it submitted its own licence as part of a plan to implement local television stations on Freeview. Its licence was the first to receive approval on 12 September. The introduction of such licences caused a potential problem, especially in areas around London, and Latest TV complained to Ofcom that its signal would not reach east Brighton and Lewes, which the station thought to be its "natural community". The station had a prospective 2013 launch date, and was already receiving programming to air once it opened; among them was a music series presented by Nick Pynn. As of August 2013, the station recruited six full-time journalists.

Latest TV started on 28 August 2014, to a potential audience of over 400,000 viewers, and pledged to air local content for "up to 24 hours a day", with six hours a day of new content, the rest being made up of repeats. Its first night started with the 6pm news bulletin, followed by the launch show Brighton Lights.

In February 2024, it announced its move from Manchester Street to Palace Pier. In September 2025, it became the first local television station to have its licence renewed.

== Programmes ==
The station's news bulletin is broadcast five times a day (11am, 4pm, 6pm, 11pm and 2am). It also has partnerships with Hubei Television and "a company in Ukraine", the latter of which enabled the station to have Ukrainian presenters, as well as hosting the Ukraine International Film Festival in Brighton. Chinese and Ukrainian communities are among the most prominent immigrant diasporas in Brighton. The station also broadcasts movies, in the FilmOnTV strand, mostly consisting of Hollywood classics and Chinese films.
