= Whitehawk Hill transmitting station =

Transmitter for Brighton & Worthing, England

Whitehawk Hill
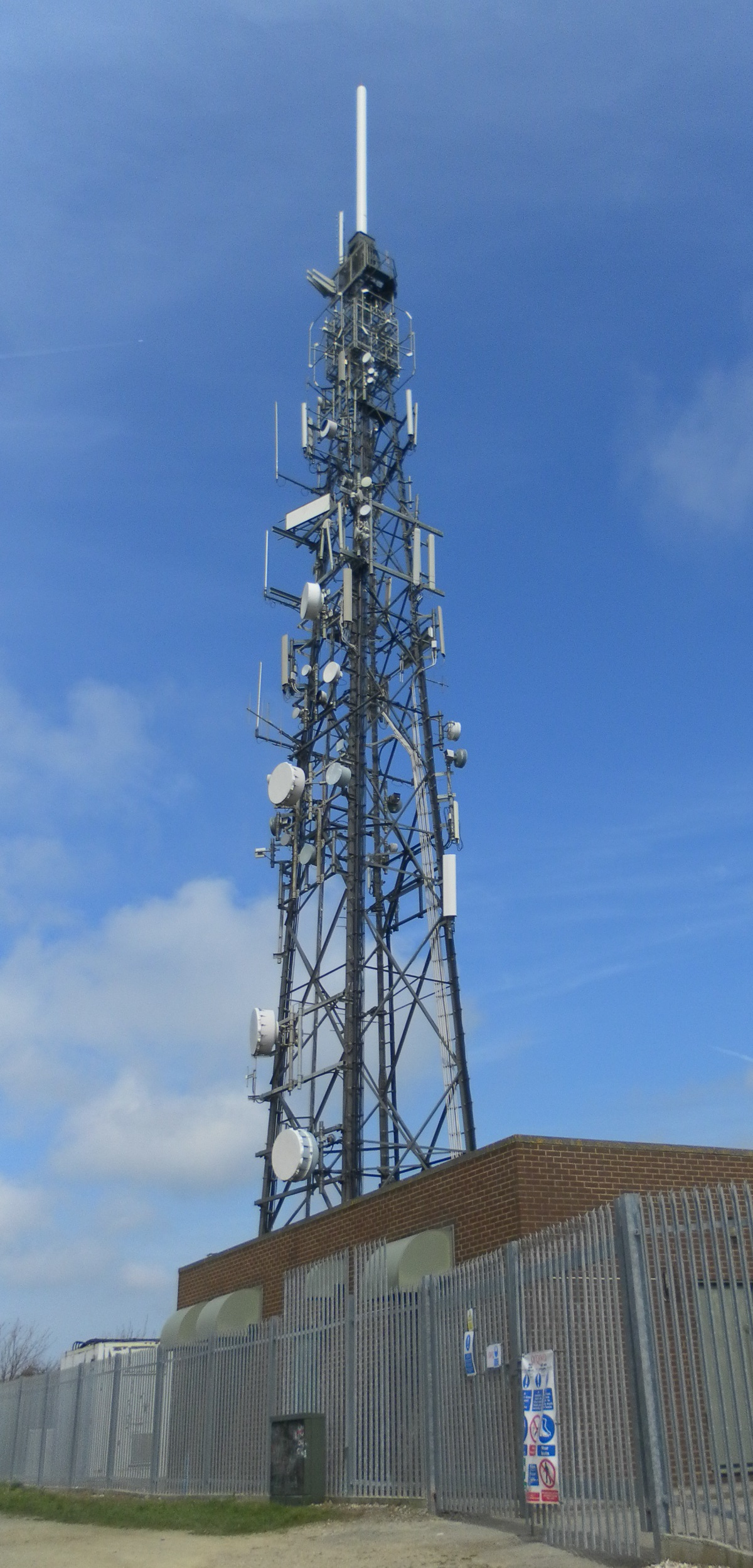

- Location in East Sussex
- Mast height: 45 m (148 ft)
- Tower height: 55 m (182 ft)
- Coordinates: 50°50′N 0°07′W
- Grid reference: TQ32960452
- Built: 1959
- BBC region: BBC South East
- ITV region: ITV Meridian (West)
- Local TV service: Latest TV

The Whitehawk Hill transmitting station (also known as the Whitehawk transmitting station) is a broadcasting and telecommunications facility located at Whitehawk, an eastern suburb of Brighton in the English city of Brighton and Hove. It is the city's main transmission facility for television and radio signals. It broadcasts digital television, FM and DAB radio to the coastal city of Brighton and Hove and to surrounding areas along the Sussex coast including Shoreham-By-Sea, Worthing and as far as Seaford. It stopped broadcasting analogue television when the digital switchover occurred locally in March 2012.

Services broadcast include BBC One (South East), BBC Two, ITV1 (Meridian), Channel 4, BBC national radio stations, BBC Sussex and Heart South.

== History ==
A radar station was opened on the high ground of Whitehawk Hill, to the east of central Brighton, during World War II. Meanwhile, television broadcasts first reached the town in 1953 when a relay transmitter was erected on Truleigh Hill, several miles to the west on the South Downs. On 5 April 1959, after the wartime facility was demolished, a 148-foot (45 m) transmitter was opened at Whitehawk. It took a feed from the Crystal Palace transmitting station until 14 April 1962; after that, signals were relayed from the Rowridge transmitting station. The original VHF signal was accompanied by colour UHF transmissions from 21 September 1970 (BBC1 and BBC2 only) until the VHF 405-line TV transmissions from this site ceased in 1983. UHF signals for ITV and Channel 4 followed from 28 April 1972 and 17 May 1983 respectively. Radio broadcasts started on 13 March 1967, in mono only; stereo transmissions commenced on 4 November 1972. From the beginning, signals were relayed from the Wrotham transmitting station; this arrangement continues as of 2026.

The original mast was replaced in 1983 by the present structure, which stood alongside it for a short time until the earlier mast was demolished. The present mast is also 148 feet (45 m) tall; it reaches a height of 182 feet (55 m) when the UHF aerial is taken into account. It is the 10th tallest structure in Brighton and Hove and is a prominent landmark due to its position atop Whitehawk Hill, which is 396 feet (121 m) above sea level. In 1990, the transmitting station was reported to serve 400,000 people and was supported by relay transmitters at several locations around Brighton: Patcham, Ovingdean and Saltdean (all installed in 1982–83), and Coldean and the North Laine area of central Brighton (both planned for 1990 but delayed).

== Services available ==
=== Analogue radio ===
Frequency	kW	Service
99.7 MHz	0.25	BBC Radio 1 (FM)
90.1 MHz	0.25	BBC Radio 2 (FM)
92.3 MHz	0.25	BBC Radio 3 (FM)
94.5 MHz	0.25	BBC Radio 4 (FM)
95.3 MHz	0.5	BBC Radio Sussex (FM)
101.9 MHz	0.2	Classic FM
103.5 MHz	0.45	Heart South
107.2 MHz	0.2	Capital South

The coverage area of BBC Radio Sussex extends to Worthing and Shoreham-By-Sea. Other stations have smaller coverage areas from this transmitting station.

=== Digital radio ===
Frequency	Block	kW	Operator
218.640 MHz	10B	1	Sussex
216.928 MHz	11A	0.6	Sound Digital
222.064 MHz	11D	0.5	Digital One
225.648 MHz	12B	2	BBC National DAB

The Sussex Coast DAB ensemble includes BBC Radio Sussex, Capital, Gold Sussex and Heart South.

=== Digital television ===
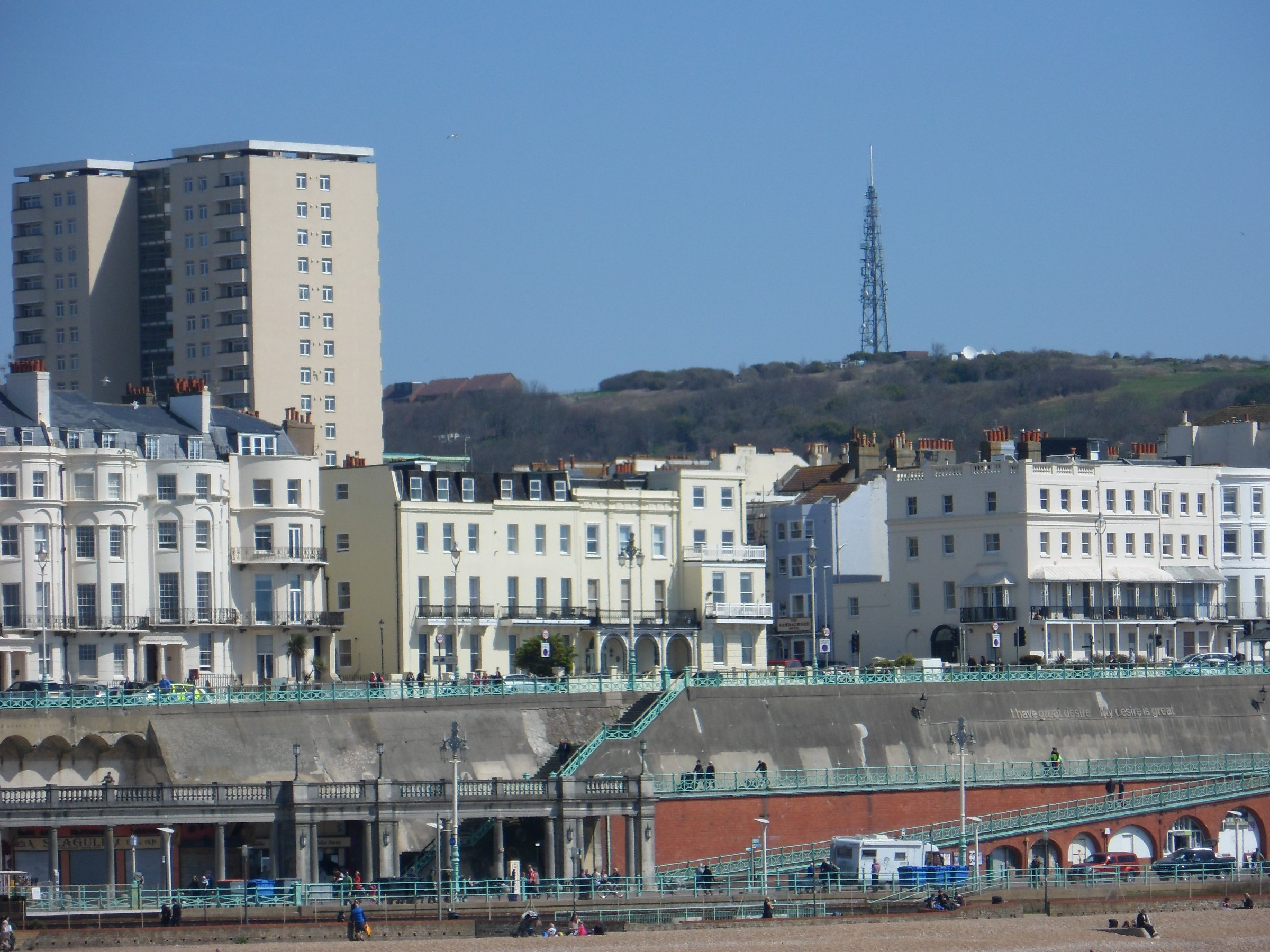
The transmitting station (seen here from the Palace Pier) stands on high ground to the east of the city.

The transmitting station provides Freeview television to 96,000 households. Since 28 August 2014, a local television station called Latest TV has been broadcast from LTVmux.

Frequency	UHF	kW	Operator	System
562.000 MHz	32	4	SDN	DVB-T
570.000 MHz	33	4	Arqiva B	DVB-T
578.000 MHz	34	4	Arqiva A	DVB-T
586.000 MHz	35	4	Digital 3&4	DVB-T
594.000 MHz	36	4	BBC B	DVB-T2
626.000 MHz	40	0.4	LTVMux	DVB-T
690.000 MHz	48	4	BBC A	DVB-T

Whitehawk Hill completed the 700 MHz Clearance Programme in November 2019 and ceased transmitting on UHF 51, UHF 53, UHF 54, UHF 57 and UHF 60.

=== Analogue television ===
Analogue television transmissions were turned off in two stages—on 7 March 2012 and 21 March 2012. At this time, the local BBC service broadcast from the transmitter was changed from BBC South to BBC South East. BBC South East had been broadcasting around the fringes of Brighton and Hove prior to switchover and had been part of the region's remit since its formation in 2001. then ITV was moved to channel 63 (because the frequency was going to be sell off so they didn't launch BBC A on BBC2'S old frequency so they launch on channel 60 (ITV1's old frequency and ITV moved for 14 days). the rest of the Analogue channels was switched off at midnight on the 21st of March 2012 (the same as Rowridge)

Frequency	UHF	kW	Service
583.25 MHz	35	5	Channel 5
727.25 MHz	53	10	Channel 4
759.25 MHz	57	10	BBC1 South East
783.25 MHz	60	10	Meridian
807.25 MHz	63	10	BBC2 South East

== Bibliography ==
- Carder, Timothy (1990). The Encyclopaedia of Brighton. Lewes: East Sussex County Libraries. ISBN 0-861-47315-9.
