= Hollingdean Depot =

Waste management facility in Brighton, England

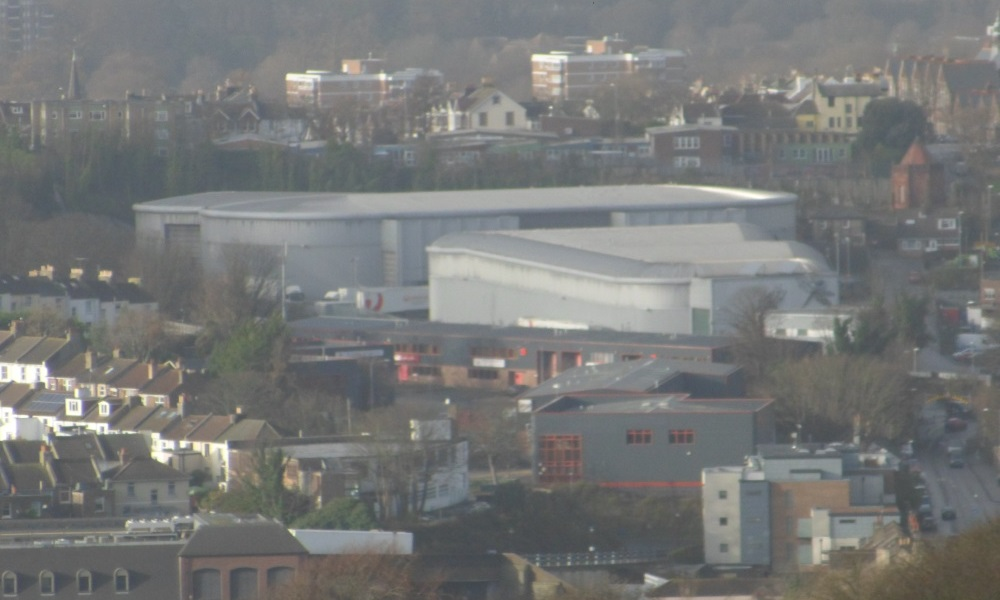
- The facility in 2013
- Interactive map of the Hollingdean Depot area
- Former names: Brighton Parish Dust Yard

General information
- Status: Operational
- Location: Brighton, England
- Coordinates: 50.8383°N 0.1312°W
- Owner: Brighton & Hove City Council
- Management: Veolia Environmental Services

Technical details
- Grounds: 3.5 hectares (8.6 acres)

Hollingdean Depot is a large waste management facility in Hollingdean, an area of the city of Brighton and Hove. The site is operated by Veolia Environmental Services in cooperation with Brighton & Hove City Council and East Sussex County Council. It is separated into two areas: a materials recovery facility and waste transfer station operated by Veolia, and a depot for council vehicles such as bin lorries.

== Site ==
The facility is located between Lewes Road and Ditchling Road in Hollingdean, an area in northern Brighton. It is bordered by the East Coastway line to the south and a large residential area to its north. The site is split into two sections: one operated by Veolia Environmental Services and the other by Brighton & Hove City Council. It contains a depot used for vehicles and operations by the council, which covers around 1.7 ha (4.2 acres), and a materials recovery facility and waste transfer station operated by Veolia, which covers around 1.8 ha (4.4 acres).

The most significant building within the site is the Hollingdean Materials Recovery Facility (MRF), which combined with the Waste Transfer Station has a throughput 160,000 tonnes every year. The facility is part of a wider network of facilities operated by Veolia South Downs across Brighton and Hove and East Sussex which also includes numerous household waste recycling sites and transfer stations as well as a composting facility and the Newhaven Energy Recovery Facility (ERF). In 2014, the MRF's budget plan expected 90% of material to go to recycling processors and 10% to be incinerated at the Newhaven ERF, however the latter figure was only 7.2% at the time.

== History ==
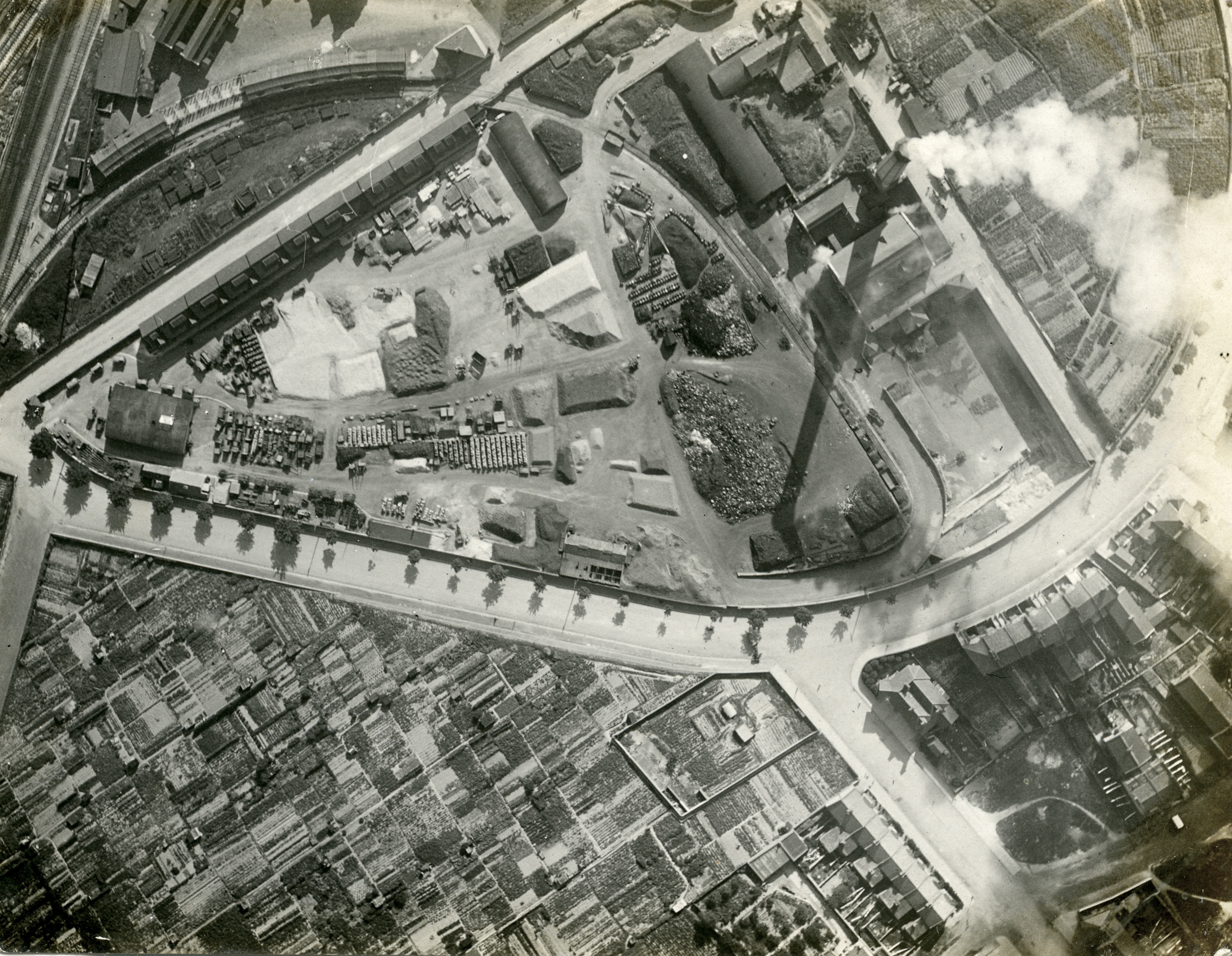
An aerial image of the depot in 1918

In 1810, the Brighton Town Act allowed people to collect waste from across the town which was then stored at the Brighton Parish Dust Yard in Hollingdean. A "dust destructor" was built at the site in 1886 with a 220-foot (67 m) chimney, where waste was incinerated; the remaining clinker was used as hard core for the construction of roads and walls. The dust destructor was in use until 1952 when waste began to be taken to nearby Sheepcote Valley and the building is now used as a canteen with the chimney since being demolished. The remaining 19th-century building is a locally listed building.

Directly south of the depot was a council cleansing depot and an abattoir; the latter was occupied by an independent recycling company called Magpie Recycling from the late 1990s to 2007. In 2003, Onyx, now known as Veolia, proposed the construction of a materials recovery facility and waste transfer station at this 1.8-hectare (4.4-acre) site. The £10 million plan was made to ease pressure on the landfill taking Brighton and Hove's waste at the time, which was due to run out in 2008, as part of a wider plan which also led to the construction of the Newhaven Energy Recovery Facility. Planning permission was granted in June 2006, and by April 2007 the site was being prepared for construction after its previous buildings had been demolished.

Construction of the three buildings at began in late 2007. The smallest structure was completed in March 2008, it is a triangular office building with three floors located next to the railway bridge. The 5-storey materials recovery facility and neighbouring waste transfer station were completed by August 2008. Works also included the construction of a new access road, the blocking of a smaller unsuitable lane and the widening of the road around the tunnel to ensure HGVs would not scrape its walls.

In 2013, three giant illuminated dragonflies named the "Regency Dragonflies of Hollingdean" were installed on the side of one of the buildings at a cost of £25,000. The artwork was made by local artists from recycled materials and was unveiled at a recycling event.

== Incidents ==
On 18 May 2018, a rocket launcher was found in a rubbish bale at the MRF, forcing the facility to evacuate as bomb disposal experts assessed the weapon; there was no ammunition in it and no one was harmed during the incident.

A 2023 report by the council found "abuses and violence" at the site, with officers uncovering knives, nunchucks and a sword inside the GMB's offices; the union described the behaviours in the report as "unacceptable".

In March 2024, two bin lorries had to be taken out of service after they were vandalised when they had their wires cut, leaving them unable to operate. The council bought four new bin lorries in response to the sabotage, with the incident being investigated by Sussex Police.

== Gallery ==
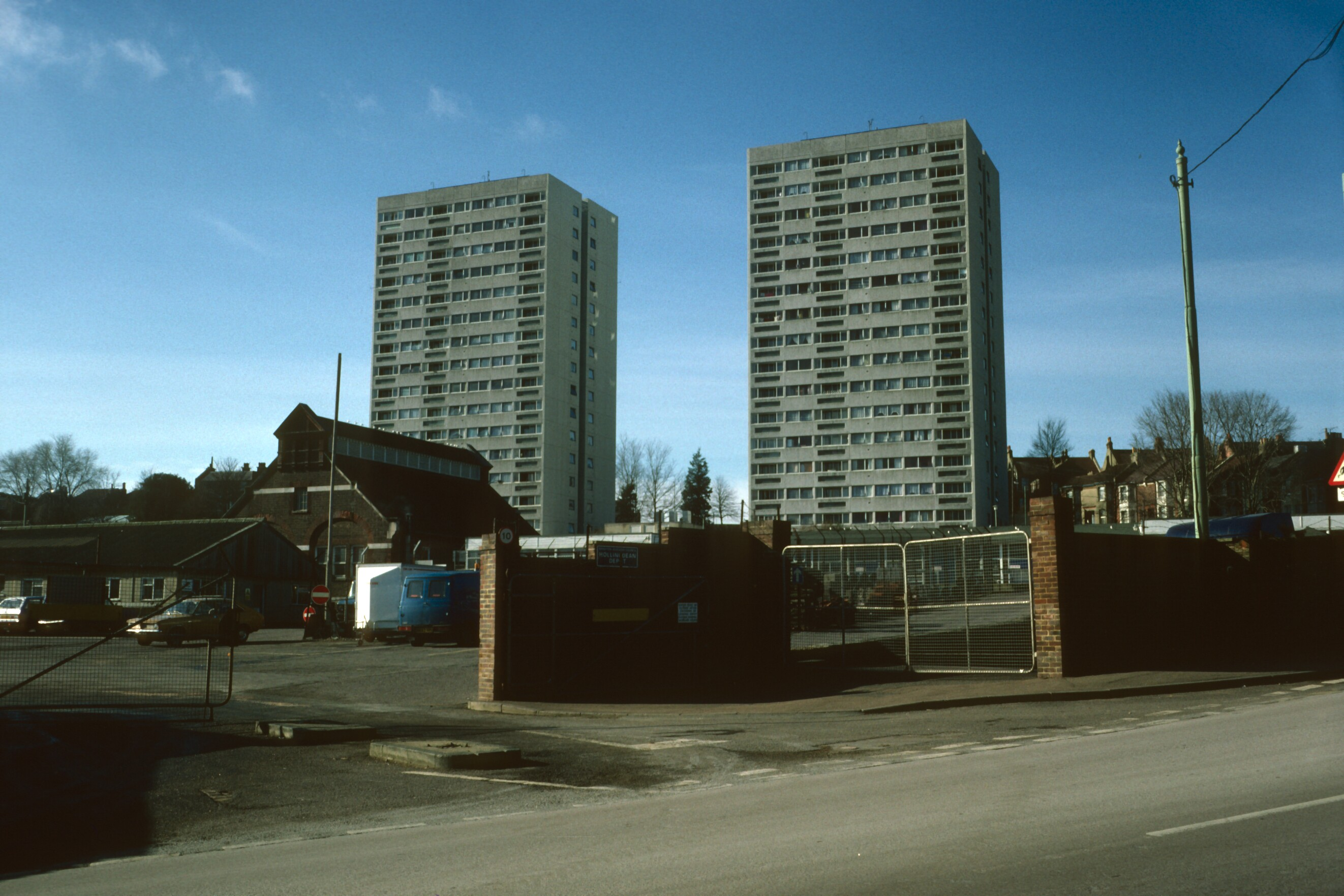
The depot in 1988

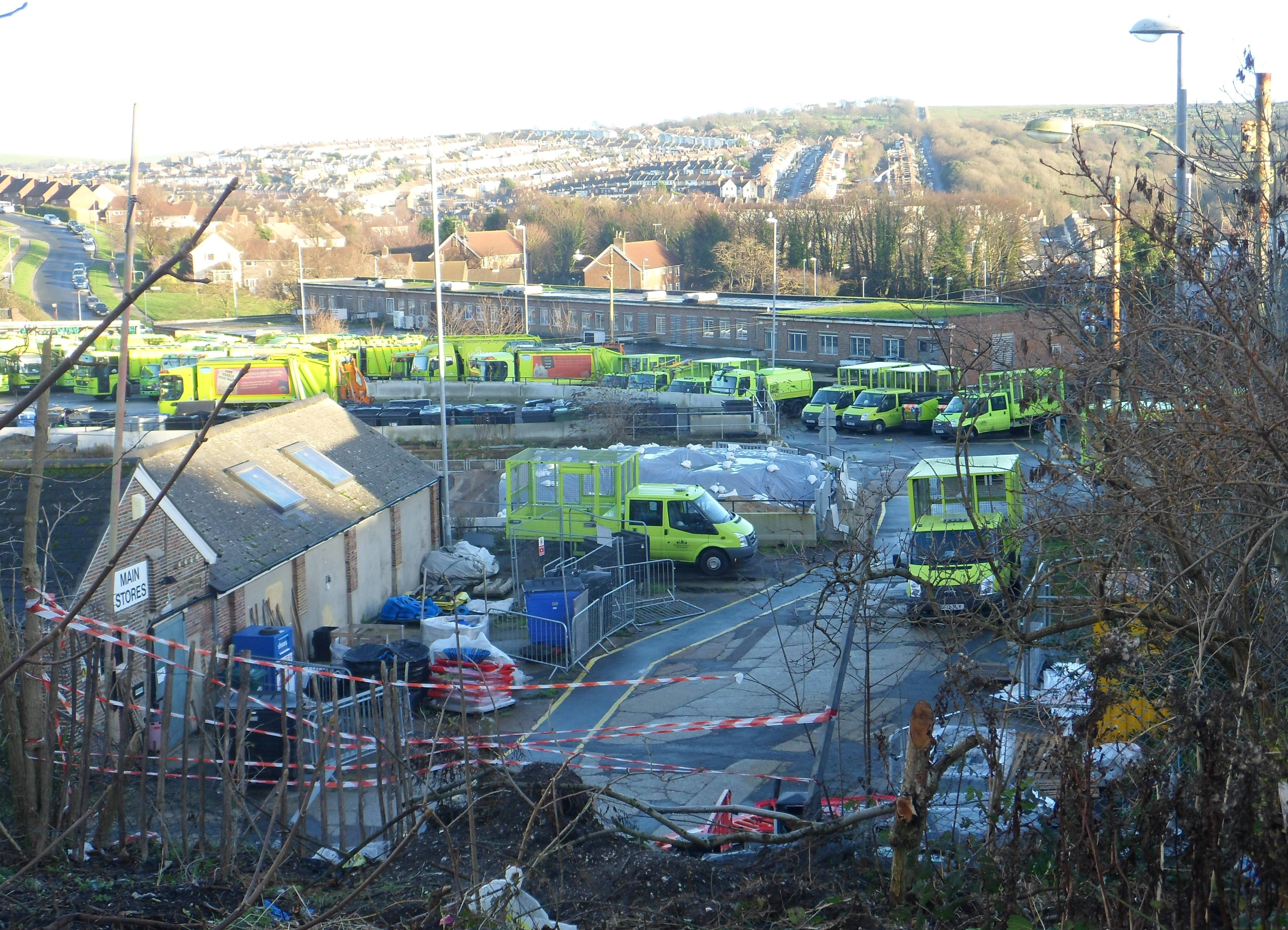
The depot in 2013

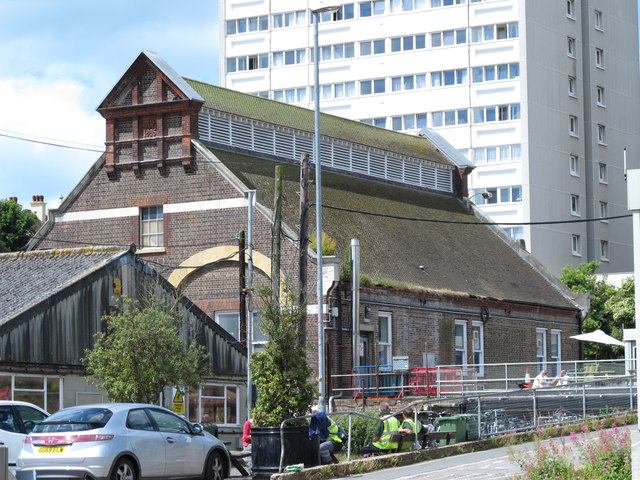
The former dust destructor in 2014

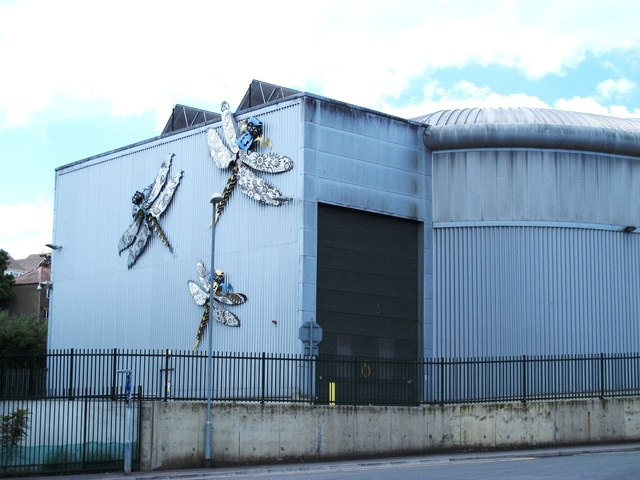
The "Regency Dragonflies of Hollingdean"
