= Raglan Squire =

- Born: 30 January 1912
- Died: 18 May 2004 (aged 92)
- Education: Blundell's School, Tiverton, Devon, England
- Alma mater: St John's College, Cambridge; Regent Street Polytechnic
- Occupation: Architect
- Spouse(s): Rachel Atkey (d.1968); Bridget (Delia) Lawless
- Parent: Father: J. C. (later Sir John) Squire

Raglan Squire (30 January 1912 – 18 May 2004) was a British architect known for his building designs in London and many parts of the world. He was also one of the chief architects who rebuilt Eaton Square in London's Belgravia district between 1945 and 1949 as part of the Temporary Housing Programme.

== Early life ==
Raglan Squire, the eldest son of the poet and critic J C (later Sir John) Squire, was born in London and educated at Blundell's School in Tiverton and at St John's College, Cambridge to read Architecture. Upon graduation Rag spent a year working on building sites, followed by four years working in architects' offices and studying part-time for his RIBA exams at the Regent Street Polytechnic's evening classes in the early 1930s.

In 1937 Squire set up in practice and during World War II he served with the Royal Engineers and helped establish the RIBA Reconstruction Committee, many of whose recommendations were put into practice during the rebuilding of London after the war.

== Later career ==
In 1948 Squire founded Raglan Squire & Partners; their early commissions including educational and industrial buildings. He was also involved in the redevelopment of Eaton Square in Belgravia, working for the Grosvenor Estate, in charge of the conversion of 100 houses in Eaton Square.

In 1952 Squire embarked on his first major overseas project when he was commissioned to design the Engineering College at Rangoon University (now the Pyay campus of University of Medicine 1, Yangon) in Burma. He regarded this project as the high point of his career, and it opened the door to commissions all over the world. He was particularly proud of his design for the assembly hall at Rangoon. His other foreign work included a town planning scheme for Mosul in Iraq, and a report for Baghdad airport, both in 1955.

Throughout the 1950s and 1960s, Raglan Squire & Partners was involved in several British projects, including large office blocks in Croydon and a notable factory at Farnborough.

Squire was also in demand abroad, particularly in Singapore and the Middle East, and had a long relationship with the Hilton Hotel chain, including the Royal Tehran Hilton, the Tunis Hilton, the Cyprus Hilton in Nicosia, the Bahrain Hilton and the 400-room Jakarta Hilton.

In the 1970s he worked in the Netherlands, Jamaica (where he designed the beachside Inter-Continental Hotel at Ocho Rios) and Malta; he also designed the spectacular Bank of America building in Singapore.

Squire retired from active practice in 1981. The architect Michael Squire, of Squire and Partners, is his son, and is probably best known for redesigning the Chelsea Barracks.
