= Michael Squire (architect) =

British architect (1946–2023)

Michael James Squire (3 May 1946 – 4 May 2023) was a British architect.

== Biography ==
=== Early life and education ===
Michael Squire was born on 3 May 1946 to architect, Raglan Squire, who was known for his work on Eaton Square in Belgravia. He was also the grandson of J. C. Squire, a poet and founder of the 1922 Architecture Club.

Squire attended Blundell's School in Devon and studied architecture at St John's College, Cambridge under Sir Leslie Martin and Sir Colin St John Wilson.

Squire is survived by his second wife, Rosy, three children from their union, and two sons from his first marriage to Pansy.

=== Career ===
Squire worked at his father's firm, contributing to various projects, including the Malta Hilton.

In 1976, Squire established his own architectural firm, Squire and Partners. The firm gained traction in the 1980s by designing notable structures in West London, including an abode for Dubai's ruler. Later, it faced challenges during the 1989 property downturn, but Squire built the practice up again and in the late 1990s was at the vanguard of a new wave of luxury apartment-buildings in central London locations, such as Brook House on Park Lane and The Knightsbridge just south of Hyde Park.

In his later years, Squire's projects included the Clarges Mayfair apartments on Piccadilly; Twenty Grosvenor Square, a redevelopment of the former headquarters of the US navy; and 268 apartments at The Broadway in Victoria. One Tower Bridge, a mixed-use project that included the Bridge Theatre, was championed by Squire as the completion of the "cultural string of pearls" along the South Bank. Squire also designed Southbank Place, which includes a new corporate headquarters for Shell. He is probably best known for his work on Chelsea Barracks.

In 2017, Squire converted a former Edwardian department store in Brixton into an RIBA National Award-winning office space for his firm, alongside community spaces and a members' club for local residents. He also developed The Department Store Studios, a neighbourhood coworking building on the site adjacent to The Department Store, which won an RIBA London Award in 2024.
