= China Wharf =

Grade II listed building in London

Coordinates: 51°30′07″N 0°04′14″W

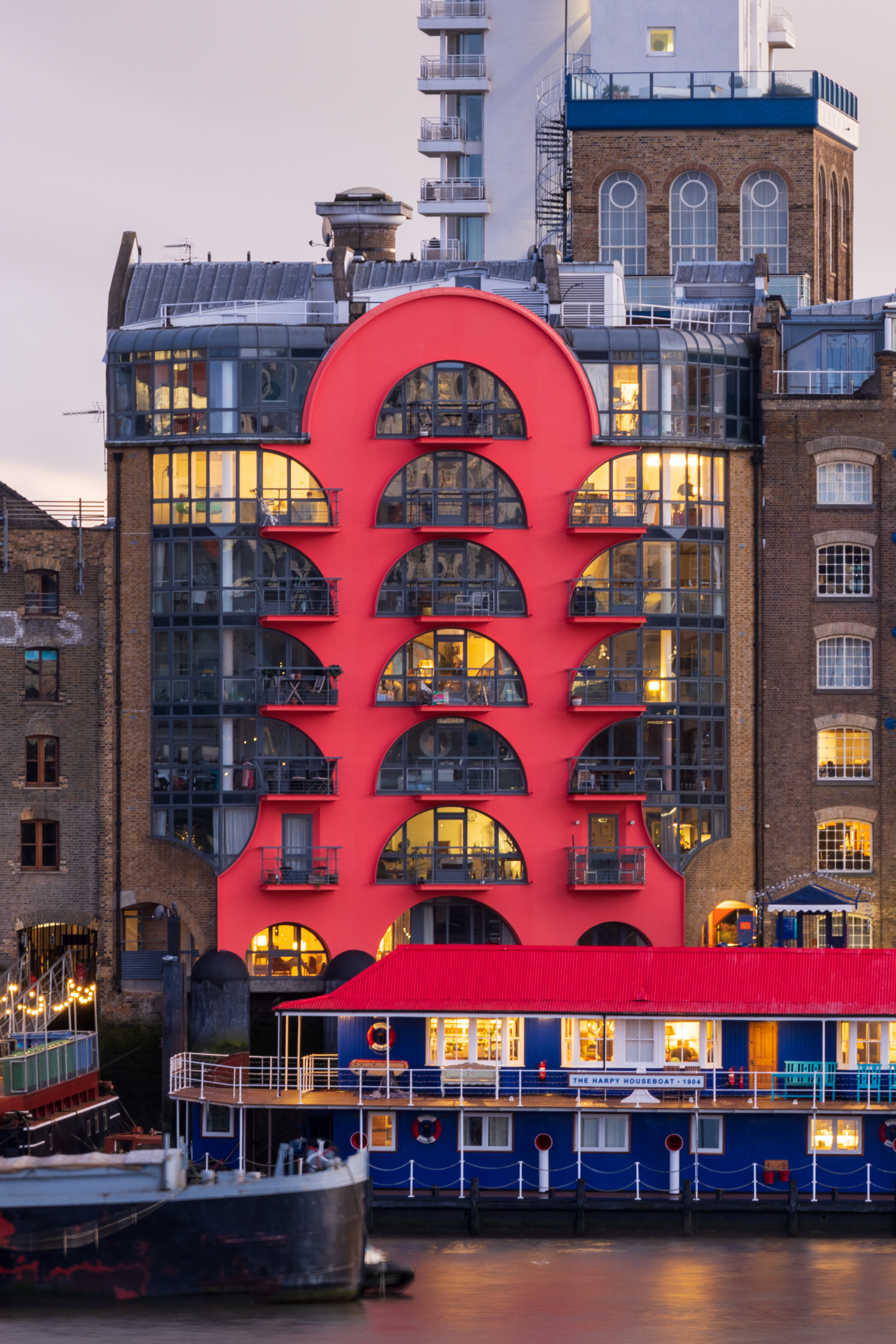
China Wharf

China Wharf is a grade II listed residential building in Bermondsey, in London. It was designed in 1982–83 by Piers Gough of CZWG.
