= Roger Zogolovitch =

British architect and developer

- Born: 1947 (age 78–79)
- Occupation: Architect
- Practice: Solid Space (developer)
- Buildings: As developer: 2018 - 81-87 Weston Street; 2017 - The Houseboat; 2016 - Shepherdess Walk; 2012 – Essex Mews; 2012 – Stapleton Hall Road; 2009 – Donaldson Road; 2003 - One Centaur Street; As architect: 1985 - Royalty Studios; 1989 - Alaska Factory, Southwark; 1985 - Cascades, Isle of Dogs; 1976 - Riverside Restaurant

Roger Zogolovitch FRSA (born 1947) is a British architect and independent developer based in London.

== History ==
Zogolovitch studied at the Architectural Association School of Architecture (AA) in London (1965-1971), and served as president to the Architectural Association (1991–93).

In 1976 he co-founded architecture practice CZWG, where he was a partner (1976-1986). He later established Lake Estates Ltd (1982); Charterhouse Estates Ltd with the Water Authorities Superannuation Fund WASF (1986–1990); and Solidspace (2003-ongoing), an independent developer.

He was Director of the Infrastructure and Development course at the London School of Economics (1998-2003). He was appointed the Royal Academy of Arts’s Honorary Surveyor in 2015. He is a Fellow of the UK Royal Society of Arts.

== Education ==
- 1971, Architectural Association School of Architecture

== Notable Projects ==
As developer:

- 2018 - 81-87 Weston Street, London, with Allford Hall Monaghan Morris
- 2017 - The Houseboat, Poole, with Mole Architects
- 2016 - Shepherdess Walk, London, with Jaccaud Zein Architects
- 2012 – Essex Mews, London, with Matthew Wood Architects
- 2012 – Stapleton Hall Road, London, with Stephen Taylor Architects
- 2009 – Donaldson Road, London, with Groves Natcheva
- 2003 - One Centaur Street, London, with Alex de Rijke and Sadie Morgan, dRMM

As architect:

- 1985 - Royalty Studios
- 1989 - Alaska Factory, Southwark
- 1985 - Cascades, Isle of Dogs with Rex Wilkinson and Kentish Homes
- 1976 - Riverside Restaurant, to a design by the architects Piers Gough and Roger Zogolovitch

== Publications ==
- Zogolovitch, Roger (2018). Shouldn't we all be developers? (2nd ed.). London: Solidspace Ltd. ISBN 978-1527229778.

== Teaching ==
- Infrastructure and Development, Director (1998-2003), London School of Economics

== Awards ==
- 2018 - Royal Institute of British Architects London Award and Royal Institute of British Architects National Award (81-87 Weston Street)
- 2018 - Housing Design Award (81-87 Weston Street)
- 2017 – Stephen Lawrence Prize (The Houseboat)
- 2017 – RIBA South West Award (The Houseboat)
- 2017 – European Union Prize for Contemporary Architecture shortlist (Shepherdess Walk)
- 2004 Civic Trust Awards (One Centaur Street)
- 2003 Commission for Architecture and the Built Environment Building for Life Award (One Centaur Street)
- 2018 – Sunday Times British Homes Award (81-87 Weston St)
- 2018 – Construct Concrete Awards

== Honours ==
- Honorary Surveyor, Royal Academy of Arts, appointed 2015
- Fellow, Royal Society of Arts

== See also ==
- Glancey, Jonathan (24 March 2003). "Home for Old Buffers". The Guardian.
- Compton, Nick (15 February 2004). "The Regeneration Game". The Guardian.
- Stockley, Philippa (15 July 2015). "Roger Zogolovitch: the man who turns small London spaces into bright new homes". Evening Standard.
- Zogolovitch, Roger (9 October 2015). "Shouldn't we all be developers?". The Building Centre.
- Ray, Debika (12 November 2015). "Housing Crisis: Mind the Gaps". ICON.
- Moore, Rowan (7 February 2016). "Shepherdess Walk Review". The Guardian.
