= Landmark Pinnacle =

Residential skyscraper in London

Coordinates: 51°30′10″N 0°1′31.7″W

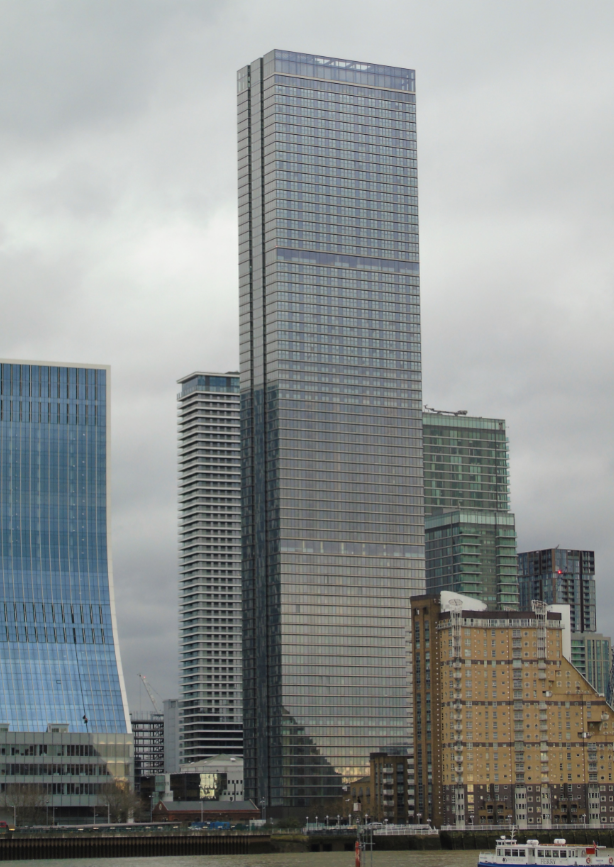
- Landmark Pinnacle, December 2020
- Alternative names: City Pride

General information
- Status: Completed
- Type: Monolith
- Location: Canary Wharf, Isle of Dogs, London, E14; United Kingdom, 10 Marsh Wall, London E14 9GU, United Kingdom, Greater London, United Kingdom
- Current tenants: ~800 (approx), as of Sep 2023
- Construction started: 2016
- Completed: 2020
- Cost: ~£200m (approx)

Height
- Height: 233 m (764 ft) AGL; 239 m (784 ft) AOD
- Roof: Flat, open deck
- Top floor: 75
- Observatory: 2, 75th floor

Technical details
- Floor count: 76
- Lifts/elevators: 7 residential, 2 serviced apartments, 1 utility

Design and construction
- Architecture firm: Squire and Partners
- Developer: Chalegrove Properties Limited
- Structural engineer: WSP Group
- Services engineer: Hoare Lea
- Main contractor: J Reddington Limited

Other information
- Parking: Basement -1, ~30 resident bays

Website
- landmarkpinnacle.com

Landmark Pinnacle is a 233-metre (764 ft) skyscraper constructed by developer Chalegrove Properties in Marsh Wall in Millwall on the Isle of Dogs, London, United Kingdom. The 75-storey Landmark Pinnacle is a short distance west from the privately owned financial centre of Canary Wharf. It is the tallest residential tower in the United Kingdom, the tallest residential building in western Europe and has more habitable floors than any other building in western Europe. As of 2023, Landmark Pinnacle is the fourth-tallest building in the United Kingdom. The development was formerly known as City Pride, the same name as the public house it replaced, before a name change in 2016.

The Landmark Pinnacle tower boasts the United Kingdom’s first-ever residential tropical terrarium gardens and the highest tropical residential gardens in the United Kingdom. The Panoramic Sky Gardens are located on the entire 75th floor of the tower, covering an area of 6,350 square feet. The garden is split into an East and West side, offering panoramic views over Canary Wharf and the City of London. The gardens are home to over 3,500 plants from all around the world.

Since its completion, Landmark Pinnacle has been the recipient of several prestigious awards. The building has won the Premier Guarantee Awards for Quality Recognition in 2021 and 2022, as well as the Excellence Award in 2021. In addition, it was awarded the Best Luxury High Rise Living category at the 2023 Luxury Lifestyle Awards.

== Site history ==
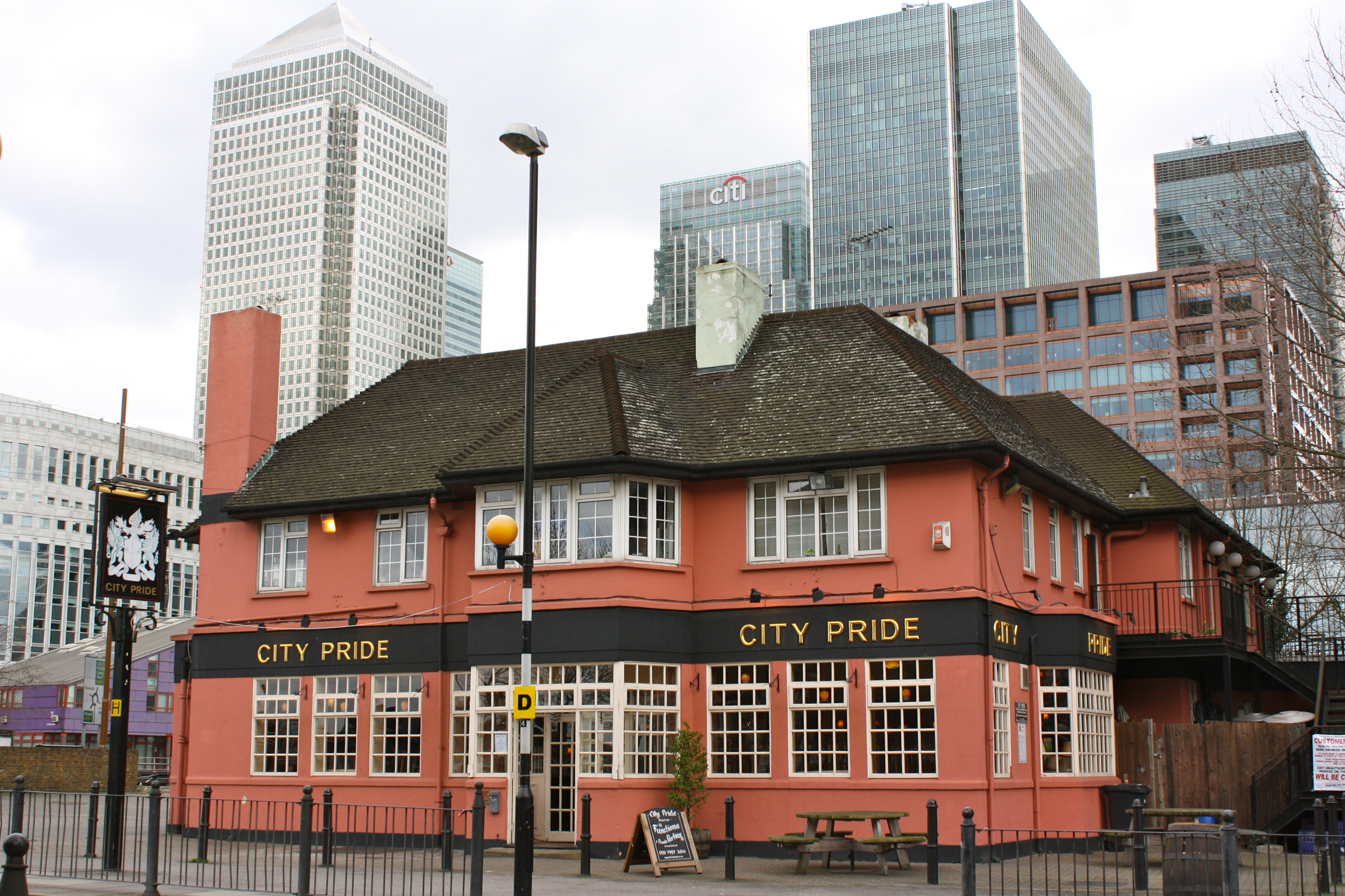
The City Pride public house in 2009

The City Pride pub was formerly the only building on the site and closed in 2012. Oracle Group purchased the freehold in 2007 for £6.75 million and sold it to Glenkerrin for £32 million in 2008. Landmark North Ltd and UK Power Network Holdings purchased the site (and the associated Island Point site) from the administrators of Glenkerrin for £43 million in 2011.

In 2016, a development loan of £320 million was agreed in order to continue with construction.

== Planning ==
Chalegrove Properties registered a planning application with Tower Hamlets in December 2012 for the erection of a residential-led mixed-use tower of 75 floors comprising 822 residential units and 162 serviced apartments and associated amenities. The application was permitted (subject to conditions) on 9 October 2013. The application is subject to a Section 106 Agreement with a total amount payable to Tower Hamlets of £5,182,279.

== Island Point ==
Chalegrove Properties registered a planning application in December 2012 for a development of 173 homes at a site located at 443-451 Westferry Road, in a linked application with what was then known as the City Pride development to fulfil the affordable housing conditions. The application was permitted (subject to conditions) on 9 October 2013. The application was subject to a Section 106 Agreement with a total amount payable to Tower Hamlets of £4,069,361 (including £2,734,636 for the provision of educational facilities in the Borough).

== Gallery ==
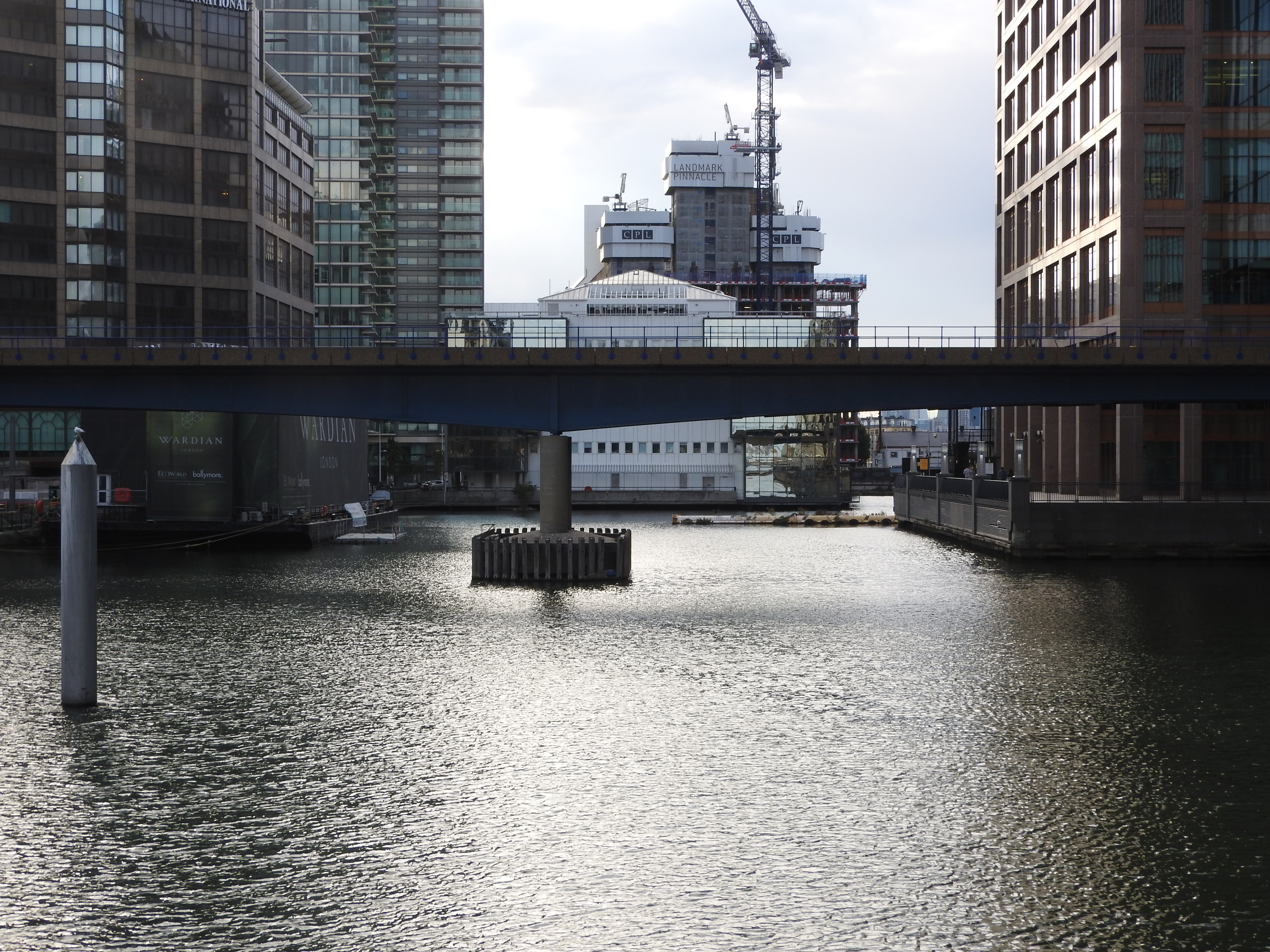
Landmark Pinnacle under construction viewed from South Dock. September 2017.

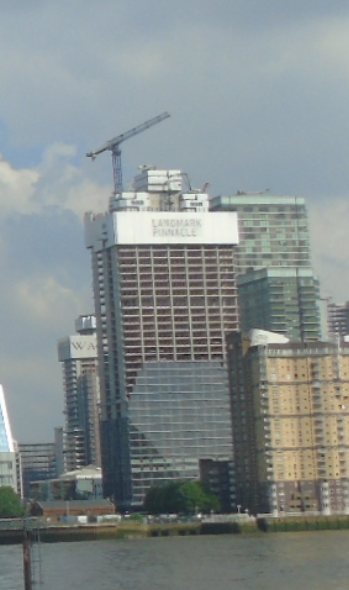
May 2018

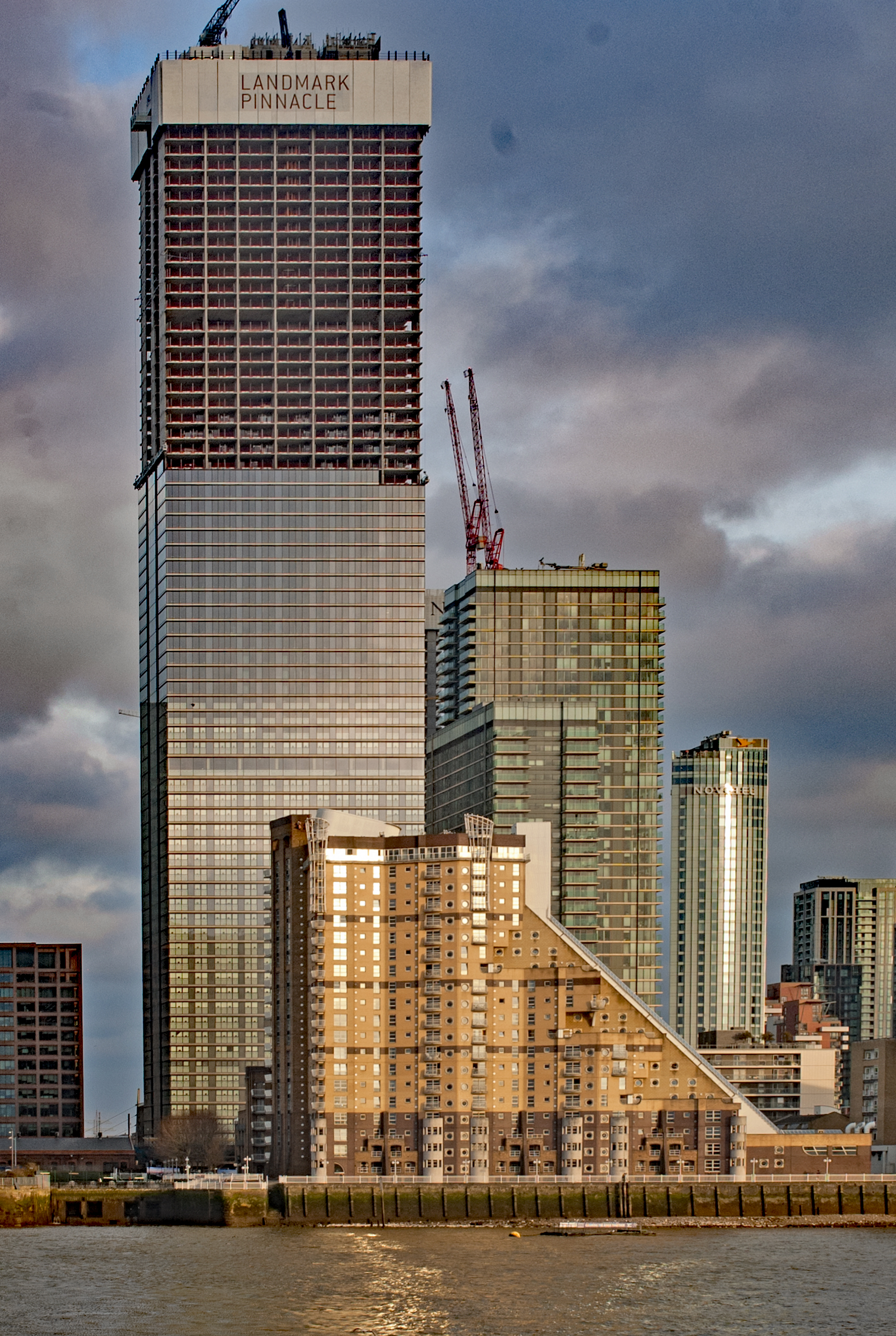
February 2019

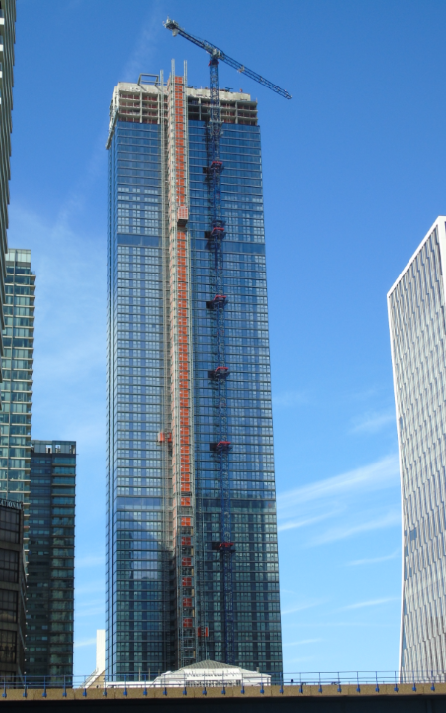
July 2019

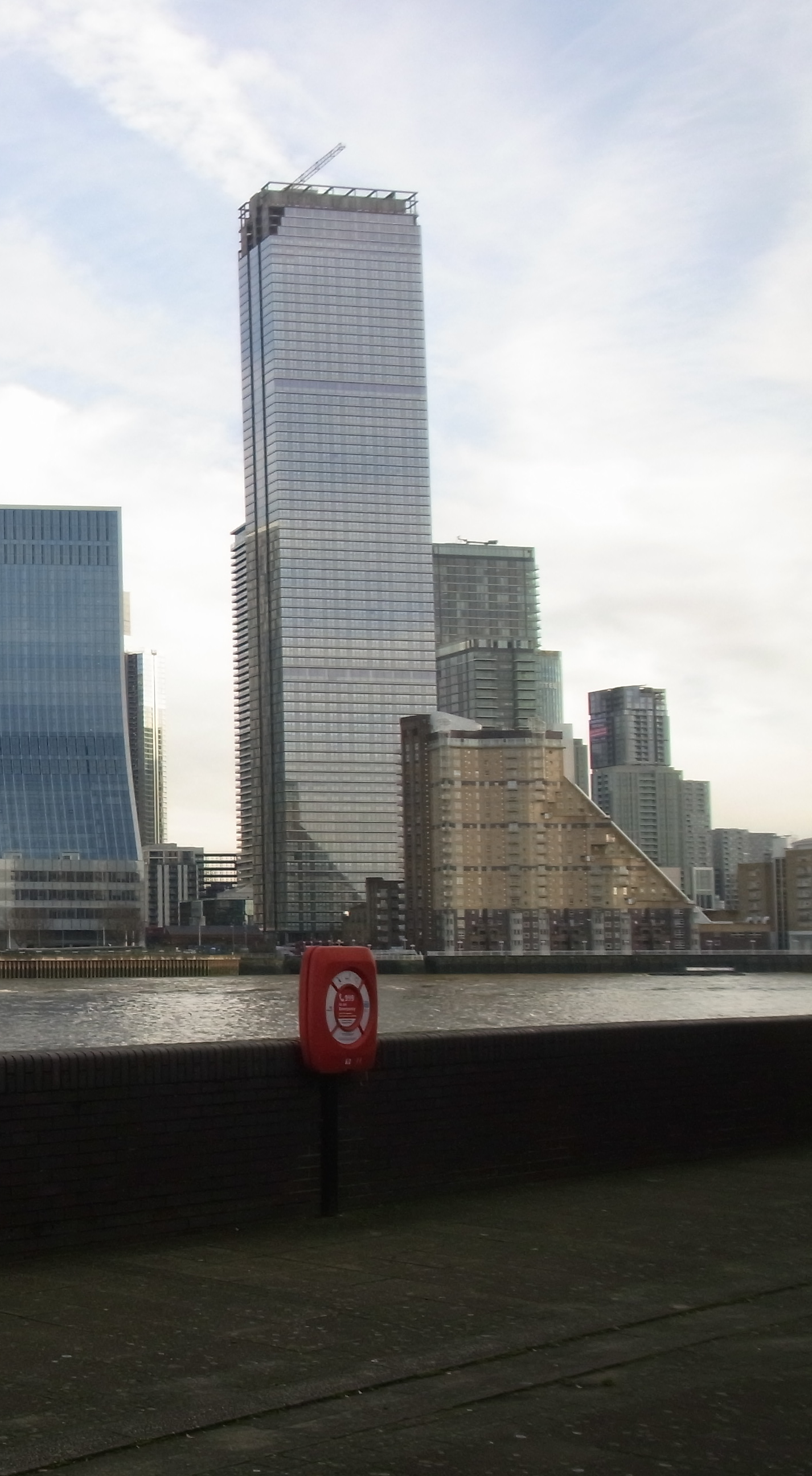
December 2019

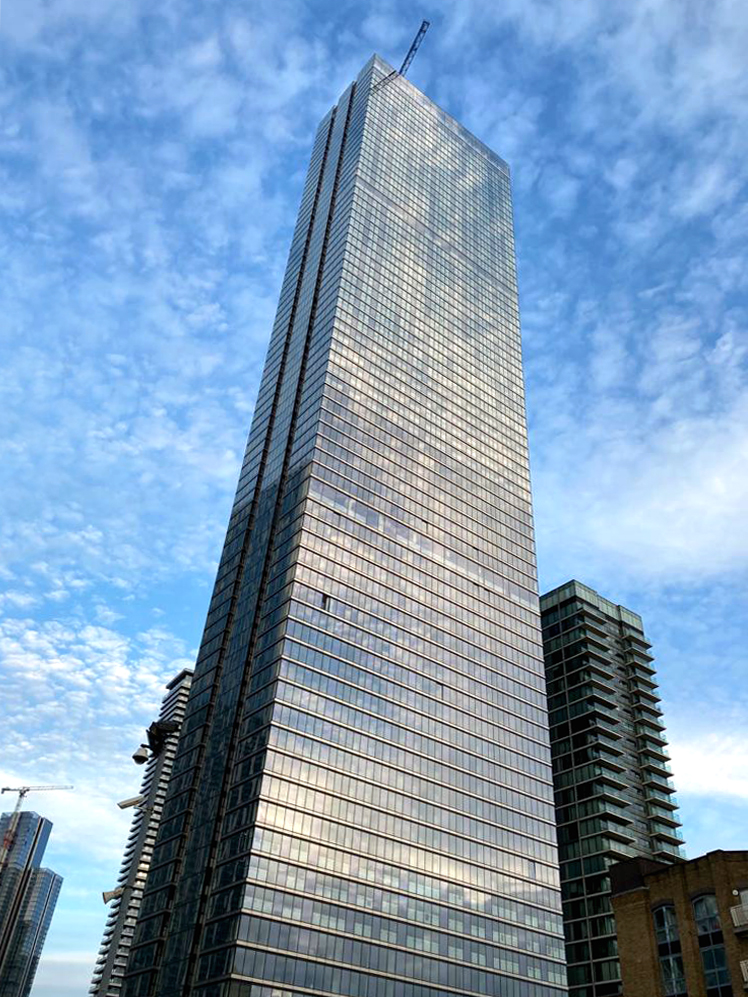
August 2020

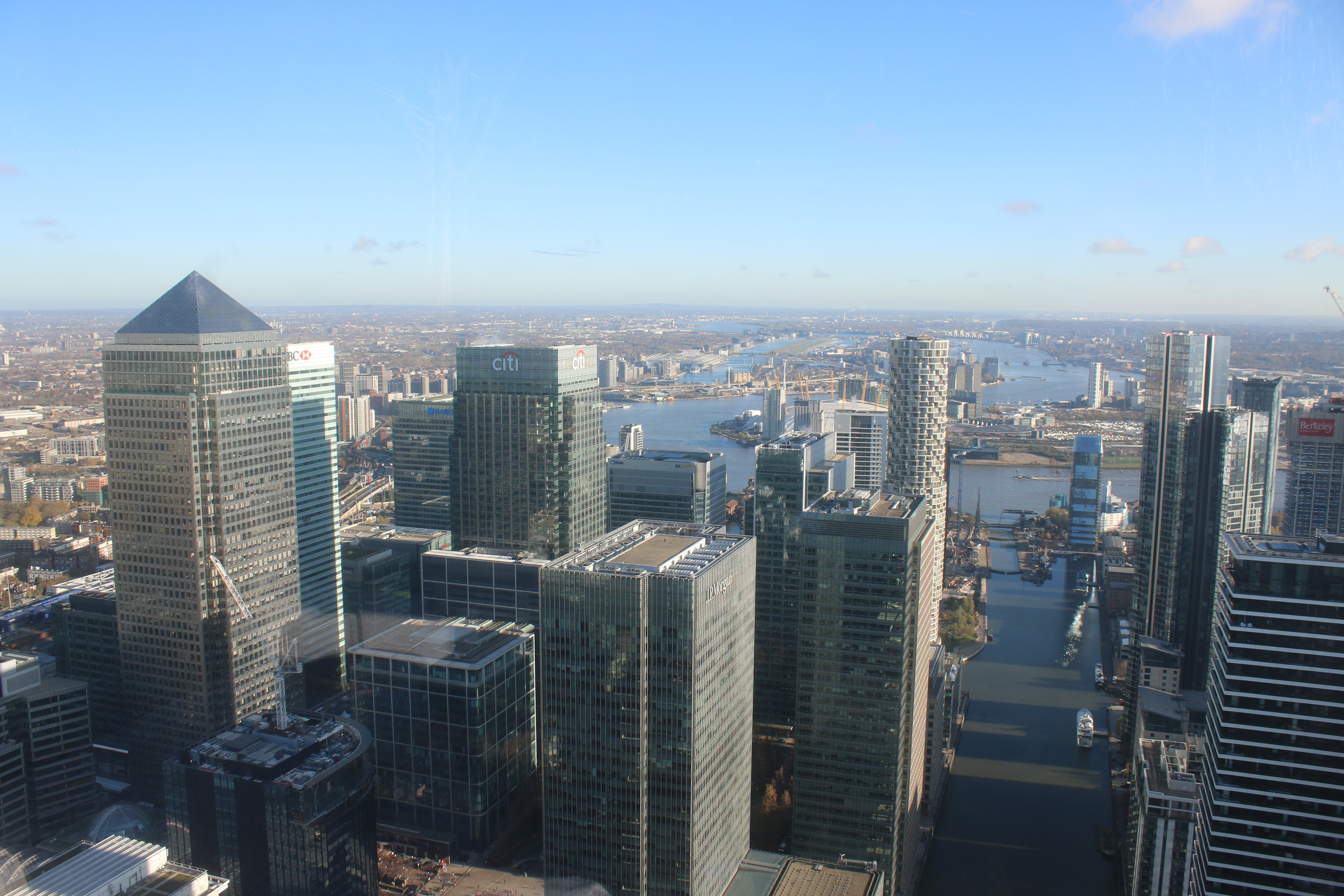
East view of Canary Wharf from 75th floor, December 2022.

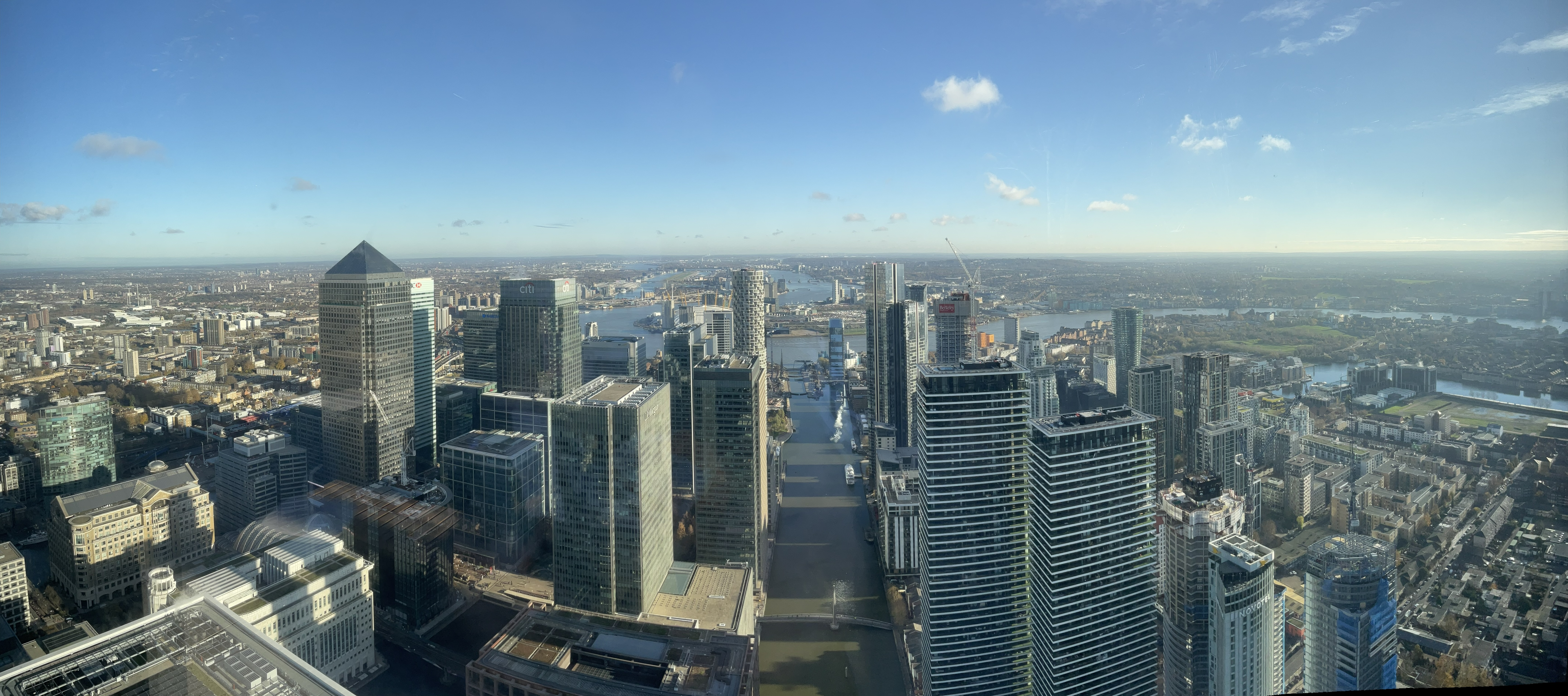
East view of Canary Wharf from 75th floor

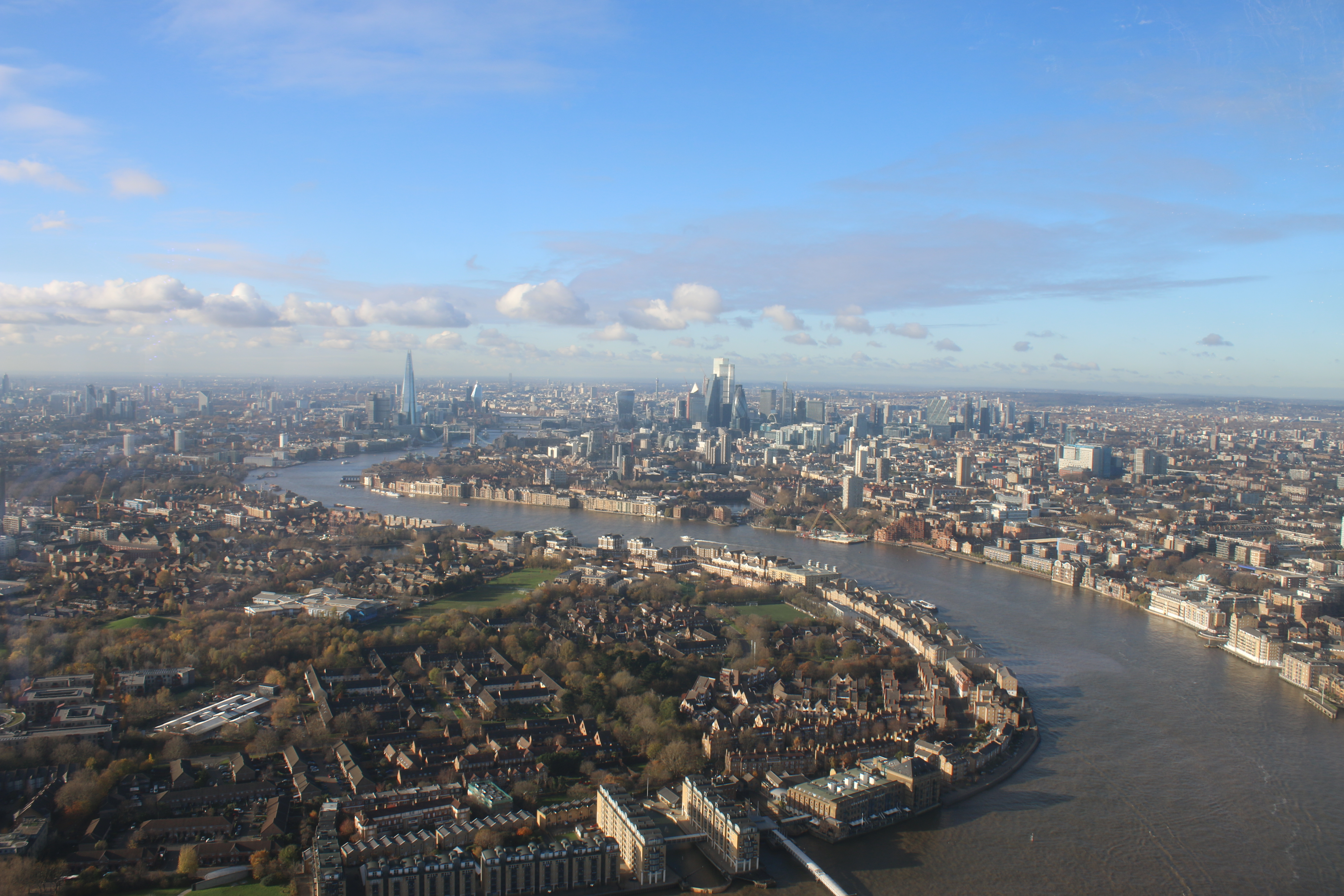
West view towards central London from 75th floor

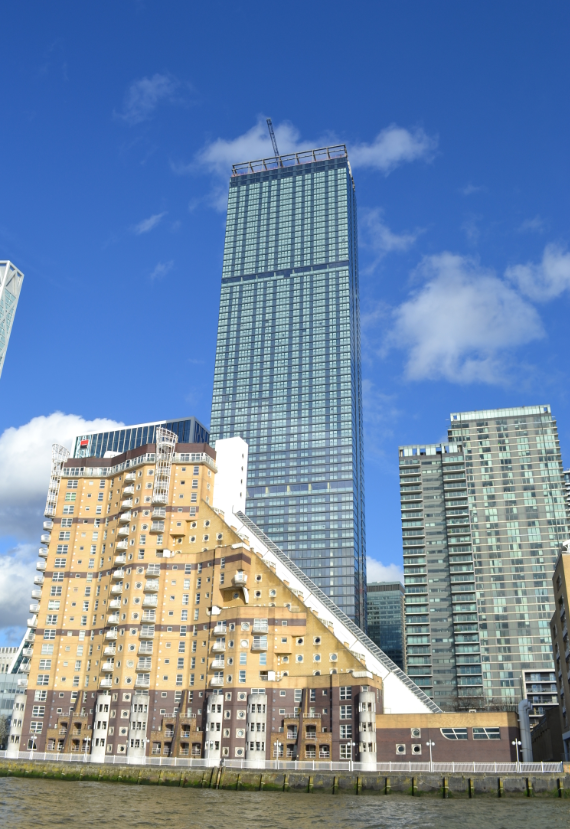
The Cascades, Landmark Pinnacle, and Landmark West and East towers, February 2020.

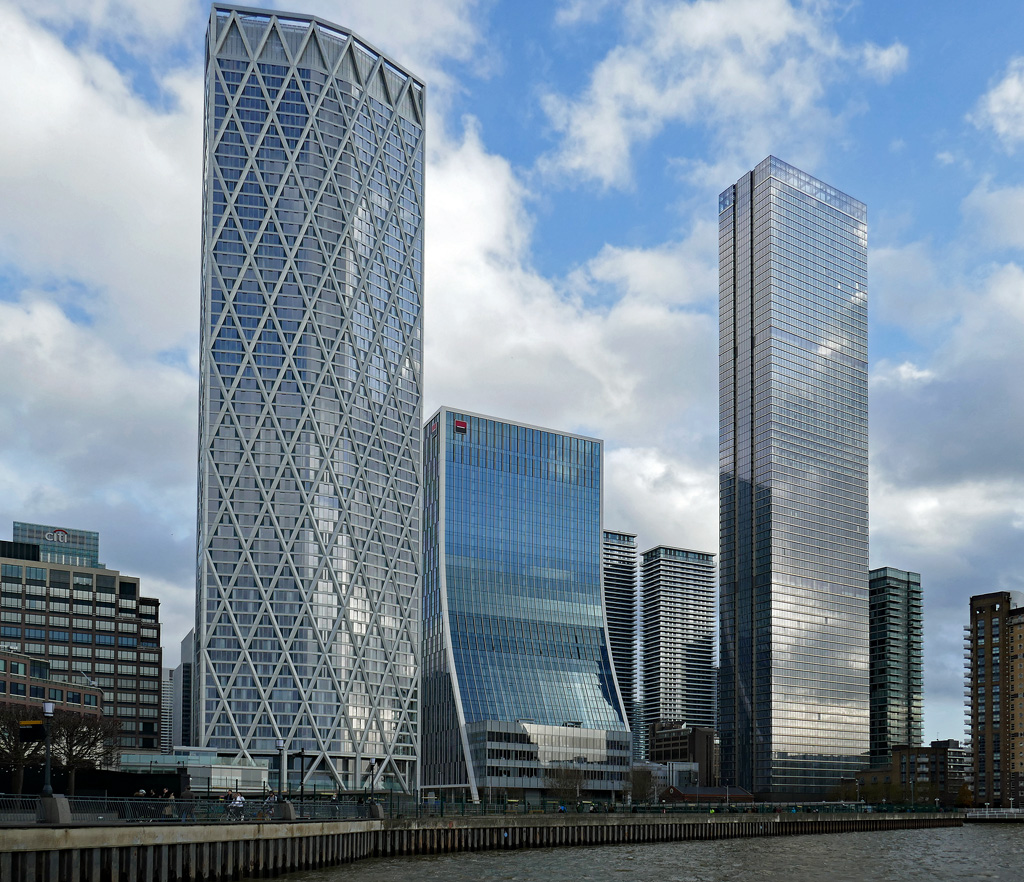
The Newfoundland, One Bank Street and Landmark Pinnacle, at Westferry Road, Canary Wharf, seen from River Thames. November 2020.
