= 24 Marsh Wall =

Coordinates: 51°30′8.3″N 0°01′30.77″W

The Landmark, 24 Marsh Wall
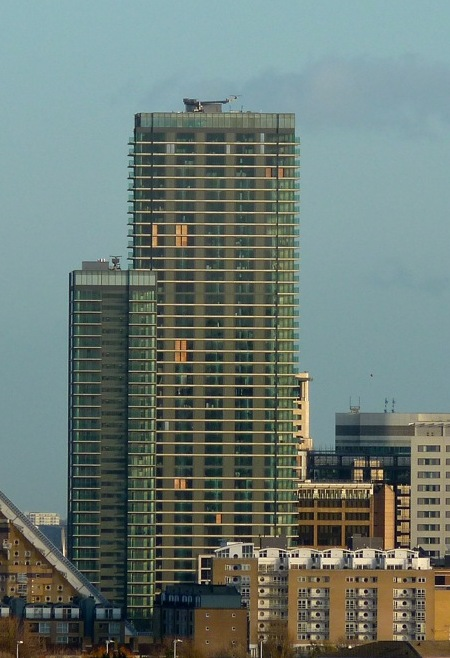
- Interactive map of the The Landmark, 24 Marsh Wall area

General information
- Status: Completed
- Location: Canary Wharf, Isle of Dogs, London, E14; United Kingdom
- Completed: 2010

Height
- Roof: East Tower: 460 ft (140 m); West Tower: 322 ft (98 m)

Technical details
- Floor count: East Tower: 44; West Tower: 30
- Floor area: 276 apartments

Design and construction
- Architect: Squire and Partners
- Structural engineer: Manhire Associates

24 Marsh Wall, also known as Landmark East, is a 44-storey residential skyscraper in Docklands, London, which is among the tallest structures in the city. Landmark East is part of a broader residential neighbourhood, The Landmark, also comprising the 30 story Landmark West at 22 Marsh Wall, two adjacent mid-rise apartment buildings, and the Landmark Pinnacle. They sit in a prominent position at the north western edge of the Isle of Dogs, and are very close to the financial center of the Canary Wharf estate, at around 5–10 minutes walk.

== Design ==
Designed by architects Squire and Partners in conjunction with Hoare Lea (M&E Consulting Engineers) and Manhire Associates (Structural Engineers), the taller eastern tower is 140 m (459 ft) with 44 storeys, making it one of Europe's tallest residential buildings, and its shorter neighbour to the west is 98 m (322 ft) with 30 storeys. The towers are located on the south-western edge of the Canary Wharf estate, close to the River Thames and a short walk from the 280,000 m^{2} (3 million square feet) office development, Riverside South.

== History ==
By August 2007 all 276 apartments had been reserved. Luxury shops occupy the ground floor, fully encompassed within a glass-covered piazza. A 24-hour concierge and residents' gymnasium are among the development's other features.

In 2007, the development received recognition as the Best High Rise Development and Best High Rise Architecture in the Daily Mail UK Property Awards. It was finished in 2010.

== Gallery ==
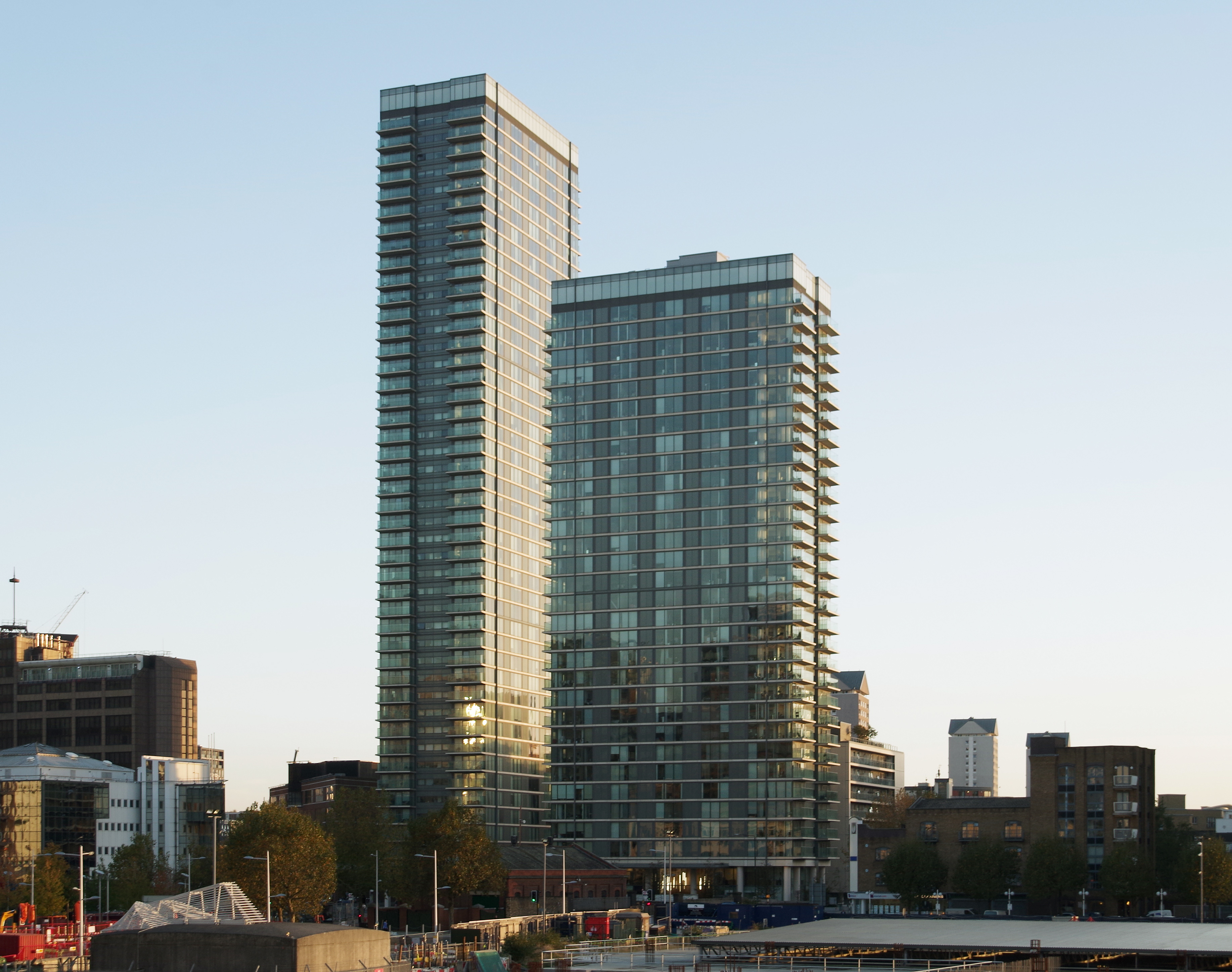
The Landmark in Canary Wharf, seen from Westferry Circus. October 2014.

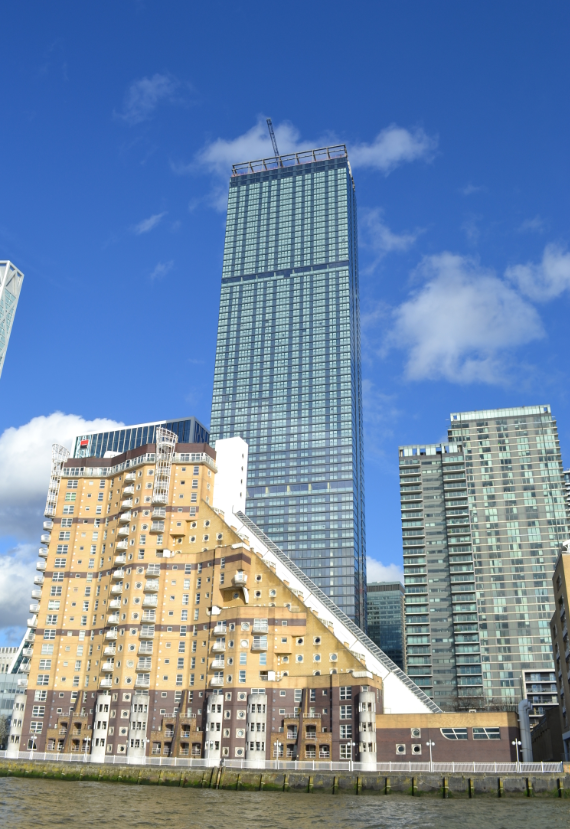
Cascades, Landmark Pinnacle, Landmark West and East Towers. February 2020
