= CZWG =

British architectural firm

Practice information
- Partners: Nick Campbell, Roger Zogolovitch, Rex Wilkinson, Piers Gough
- Founded: 1975
- Location: London

Website
- czwg.com

CZWG Limited is a British architecture practice established in 1975 by Nick Campbell, Roger Zogolovitch, Rex Wilkinson and Piers Gough. The practice's work includes community and public buildings, residential and mixed use projects, student housing and retail, leisure and workplace uses. The practice is known for its work in the postmodern style.

== Selected projects ==
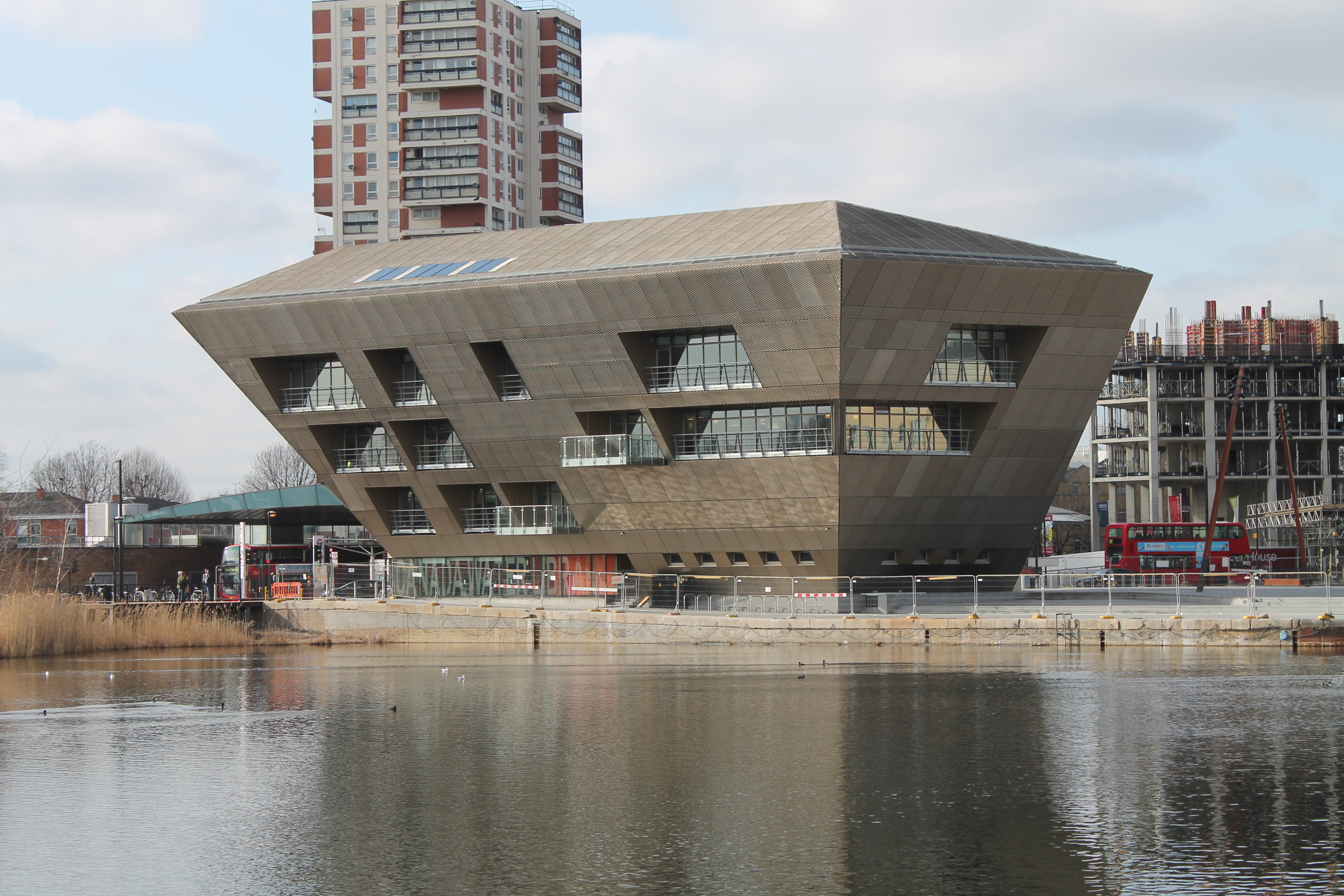
Canada Water Library

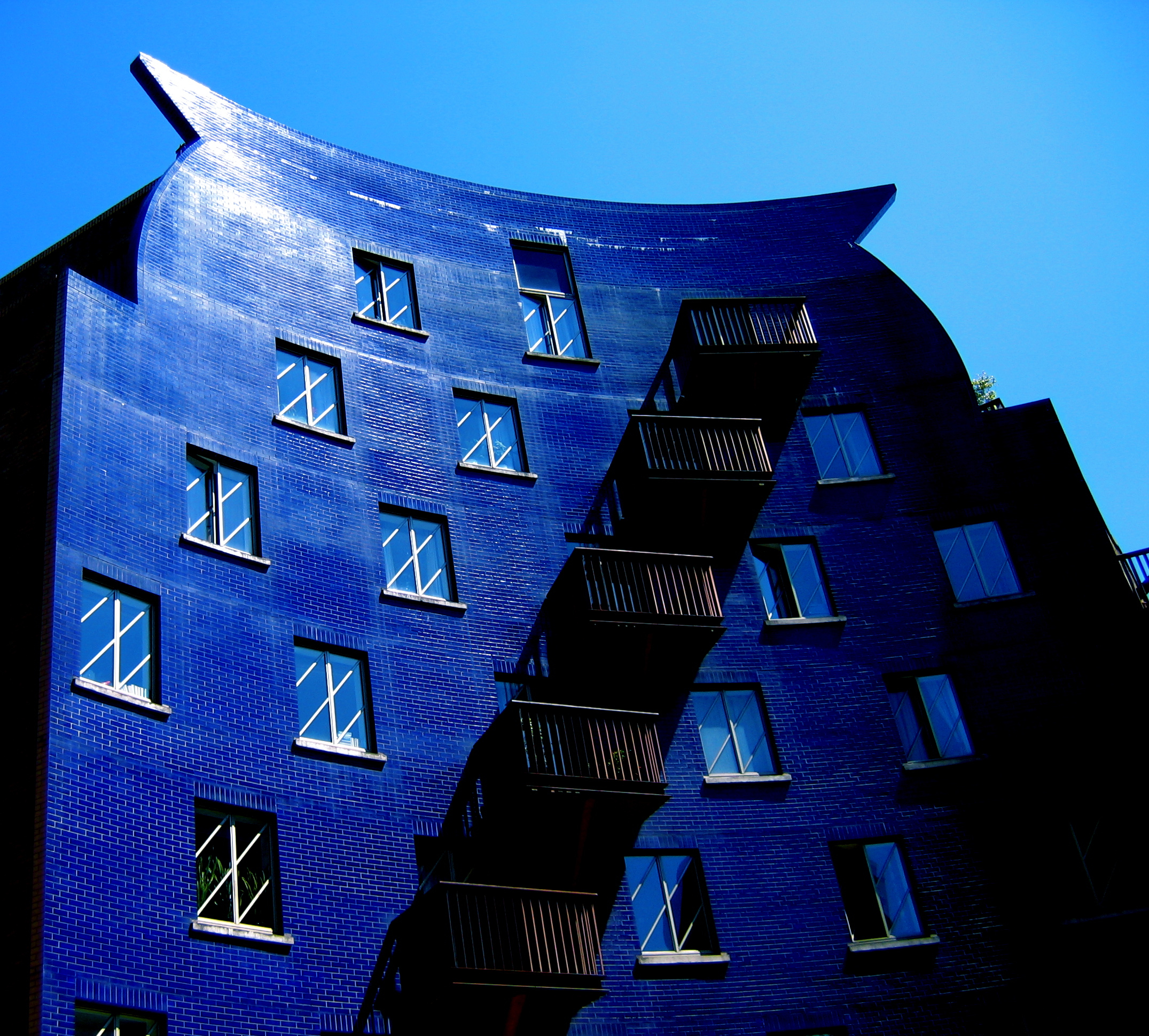
The Circle in Bermondsey, London

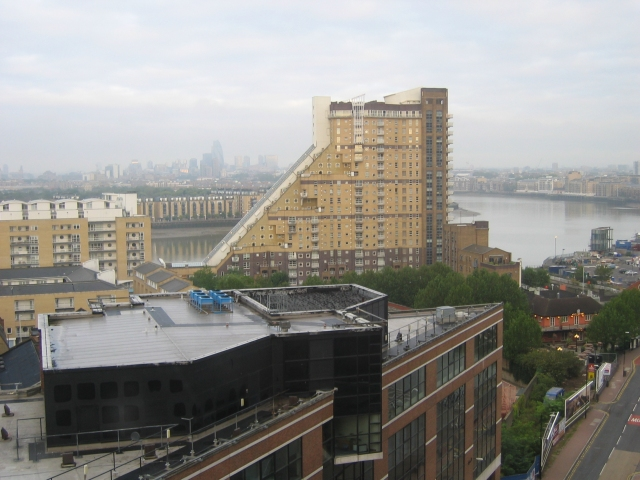
Cascades by CZWG

=== Community and public use ===
- Canada Water Library, Southwark, London. In June 2025, London Borough of Southwark issued a £5m High Court claim against CZWG Architects over defects in the library.
- Islington Square, Angel, London
- Maggie’s Centre, Nottingham
- Studio 144, John Hansard Gallery, Southampton
- The Green Bridge, Mile End Park, London
- Westbourne Grove public lavatories, Notting Hill, London

=== Residential ===
- 44 Britton Street, Clerkenwell, London which was designed for Janet Street-Porter
- Cascades, Isle of Dogs, London
- China Wharf, Bermondsey, London
- Dundee Wharf, Limehouse, London
- Kidbrooke Village (Ferrier Estate), Greenwich, London
- Hoola, Royal Victoria Docks, London
- Millennium Harbour, Isle of Dogs, London
- Pavilion Square, Woolwich Arsenal, London
- Queen Elizabeth Square, Glasgow
- The Circle, Bermondsey, London
- The Stones, Greatstone-on-Sea
- Vermilion, Rathbone Market, Canning Town, London

=== Mixed use ===
- Alfred Court, West Hampstead, London
- Aurelia, Rathbone Market, Canning Town, London
- Bankside Lofts, Southwark, London
- Brewery Square, Dorchester
- Fulham Island, Fulham, London
- Oaklands Rise, Old Oak Common, London
- QN7 and Queensland Terrace, Holloway, London
- The Glass Building, Camden, London
- VizioN7, Islington, London
- Waterman’s Place, Leeds

=== Student ===
- Craft Design & Technology (CDT) Building, Bryanston School, Bryanston
- First Way UCFB College and Campus, Wembley, London
- Isledon Road, Finsbury Park, London
- Victoria Hall, Wembley, London

=== Retail and leisure ===
- Brindleyplace Café, Brindleyplace Central Square, Birmingham
- De Barones Shopping Centre, Breda, The Netherlands
- Islington Square, Angel, London

=== Workspace ===
- 66 Vauxhall, Vauxhall, London
- Aztec West Business Park, Bristol
- Cochrane Square, Glasgow
- Royalty Studios, Notting Hill, London
- St Ann’s Wharf, Newcastle
- Westferry Studios, Limehouse, London

== Awards ==
- 2021 New London Architecture Mixing Award for Islington Square
- 2019 Manser Medal AJ House of the Year Shortlist for The Stones
- 2012 RIBA Award, Civic Trust Award and Selwyn Goldsmith Award for Universal Design for Canada Water Library
- 2012 RIBA Award for Maggie’s Centre
- 2011 London Planning Award for Arsenal Masterplan
- 2011 RIBA Award, RICS Award and Housing Design Award for Waterman’s Place
- 2010 RIBA White Rose Award for Waterman’s Place
- 2010 London Evening Standard Award for Alfred Court
- 2003 London Evening Standard Award for Fulham Island
- 2001 RIBA Award for The Green Bridge
- 1998 Royal Fine Art Commission Building of the Year Award for Brindleyplace Café
- 1994 Sunday Times Building of the Year Award for Westbourne Grove
- 1989 Architectural Brickwork Award for Cascades
- 1989 Civic Trust Award for St Paul’s Mews
- 1989 Civic Trust Award and RIBA Award for China Wharf

== Listed buildings ==
Six of the practice's buildings in the postmodern style were listed in 2018: 44 Britton Street, Clerkenwell, London; Aztec West Business Park, Bristol; Cascades, Isle of Dogs, London; CDT Building, Bryanston School; China Wharf, Bermondsey, London; and The Circle, Bermondsey, London.
