= Cascades, Isle of Dogs =

Residential building in London

Coordinates: 51°30′9.77″N 0°1′36.68″W

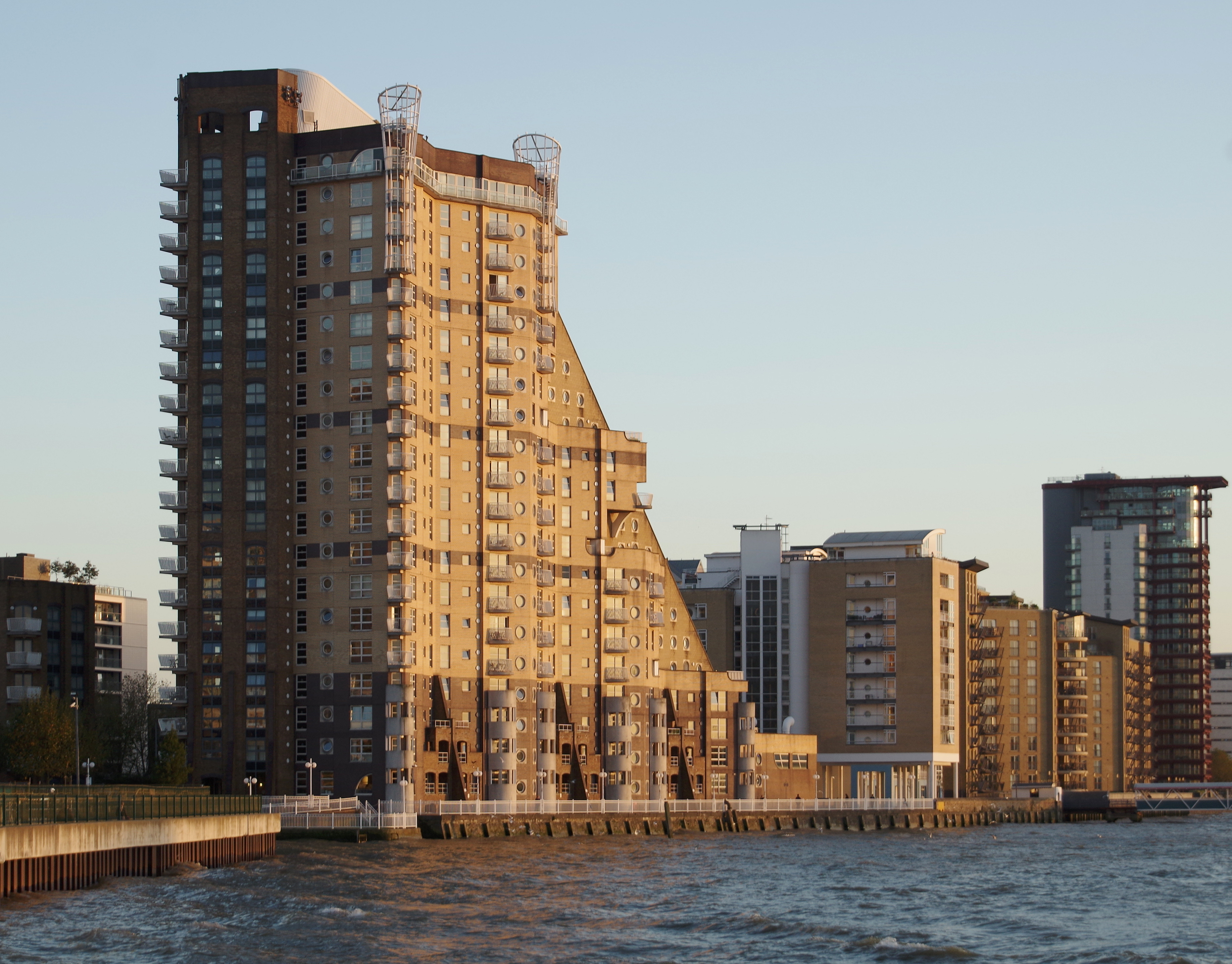
Cascades in 2014

Cascades is a 20-storey residential building and a distinctive local landmark on the Isle of Dogs in Millwall, east London. It was designed by Rex Wilkinson, a partner in the architectural firm CZWG, and built in 1987–88.

The building has a concrete frame with details inspired by riverside industry and nautical themes. It has 168 residential units.

Overlooking the River Thames on Westferry Road, it stands on land just south of the old western entrance to South Dock of the original West India Docks.

The total height of the building structure is 194 feet (59 m). Cascades was the first private high-rise housing development approved by The London Docklands Development Corporation (LDDC) to regenerate the depressed east London Docklands area. It was built by The Kentish Property Group and completed at a time "when high rise was still a discredited building form for residential purposes, and two or three storeys was the norm". The building is an exemplary architecture project of British Post-Modernism style.

Cascades was the Winner of Architectural Brickwork Award in 1989, and Grade II listed building in 2018.

== Gallery ==
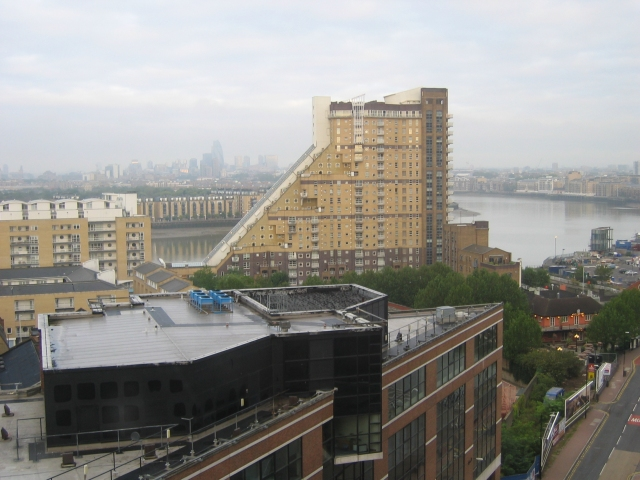
Cascades Tower taken from the Britannic Hotel, Marsh Wall. September 2004.

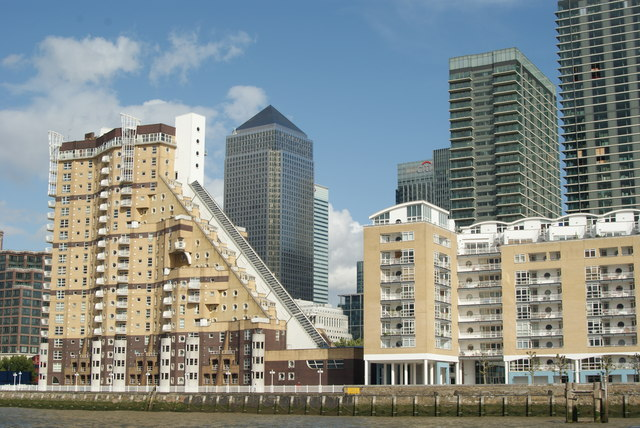
September 2009.

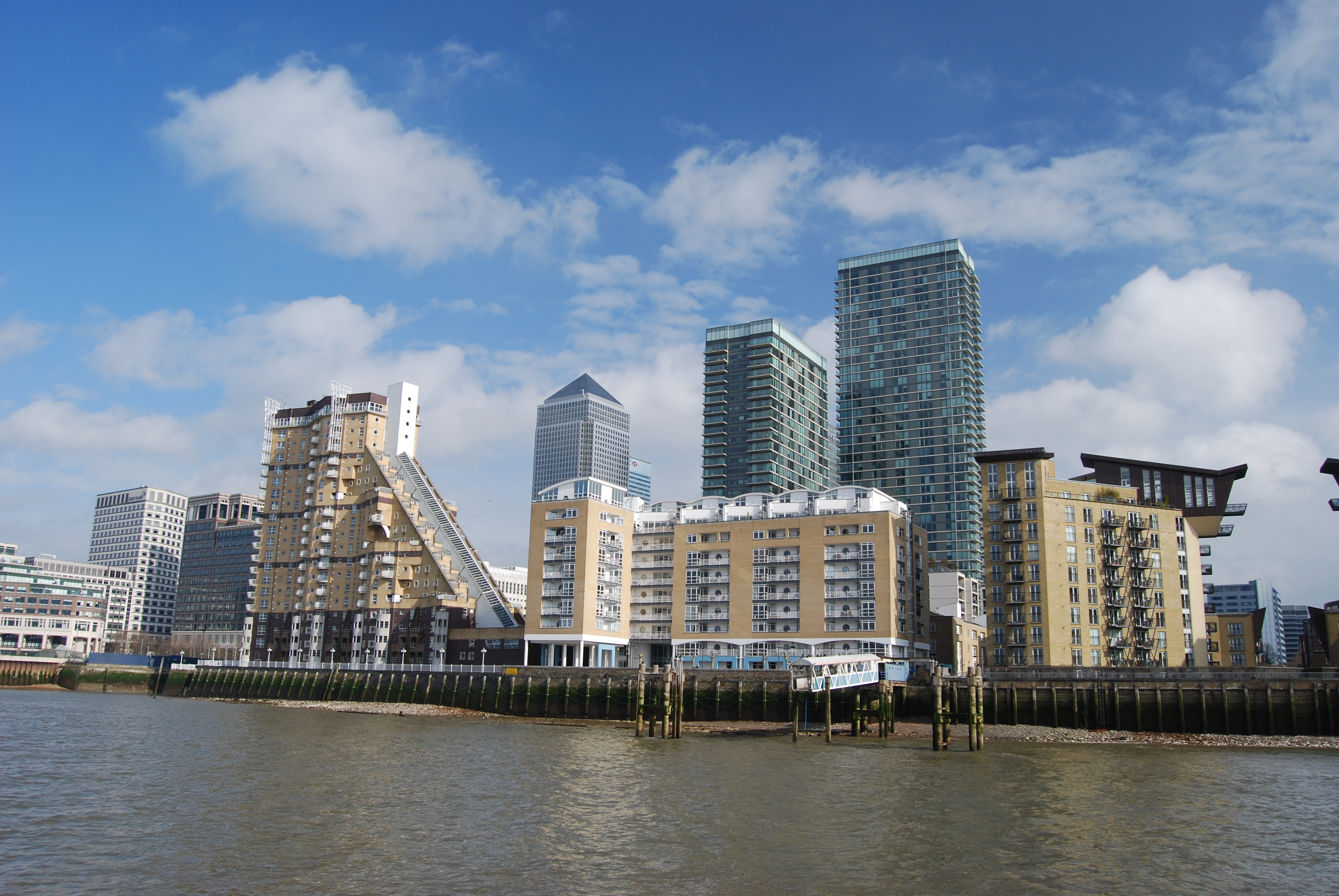
March 2012.

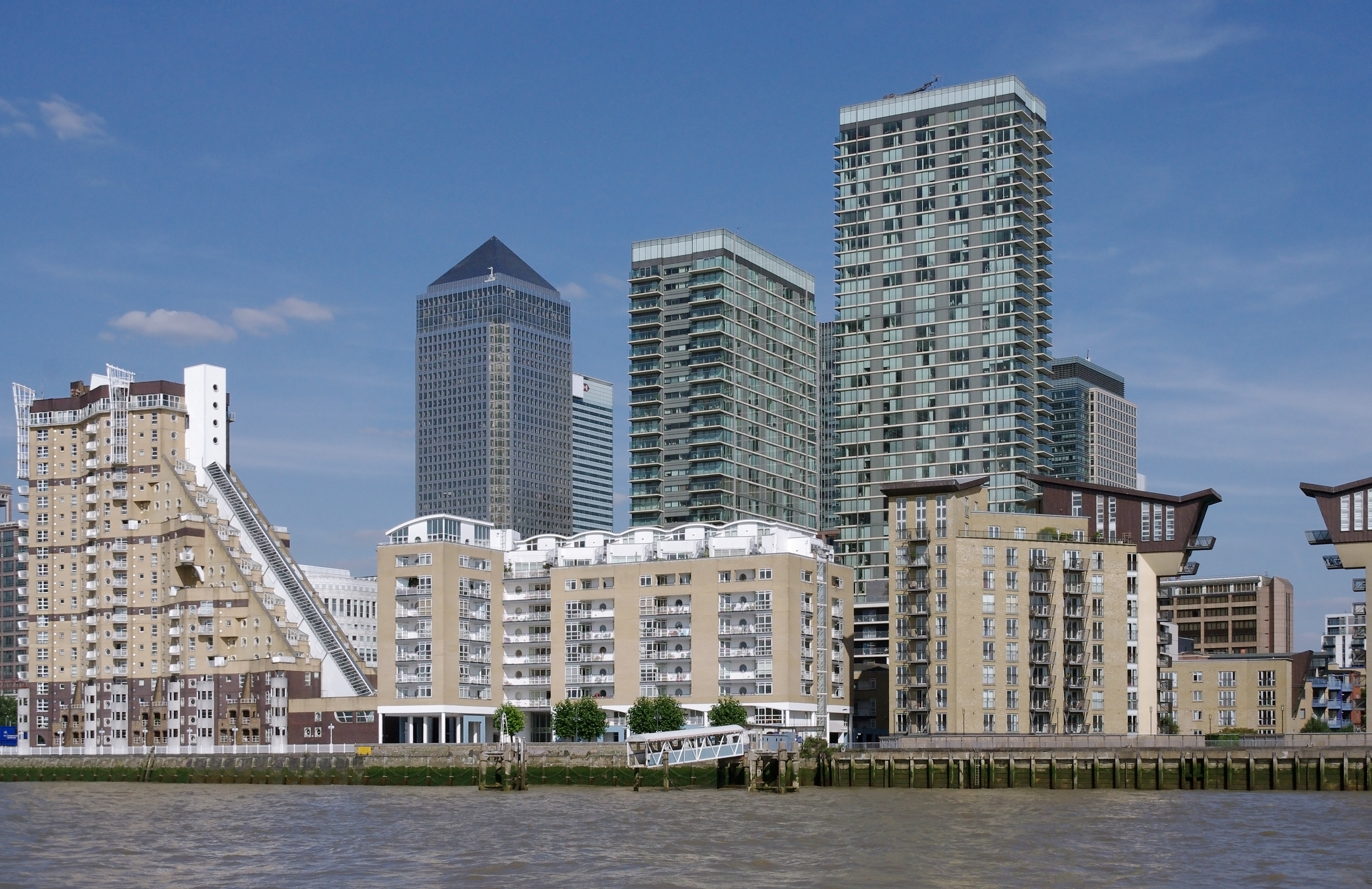
Cascades and Canary Wharf viewed from River Thames. August 2013.

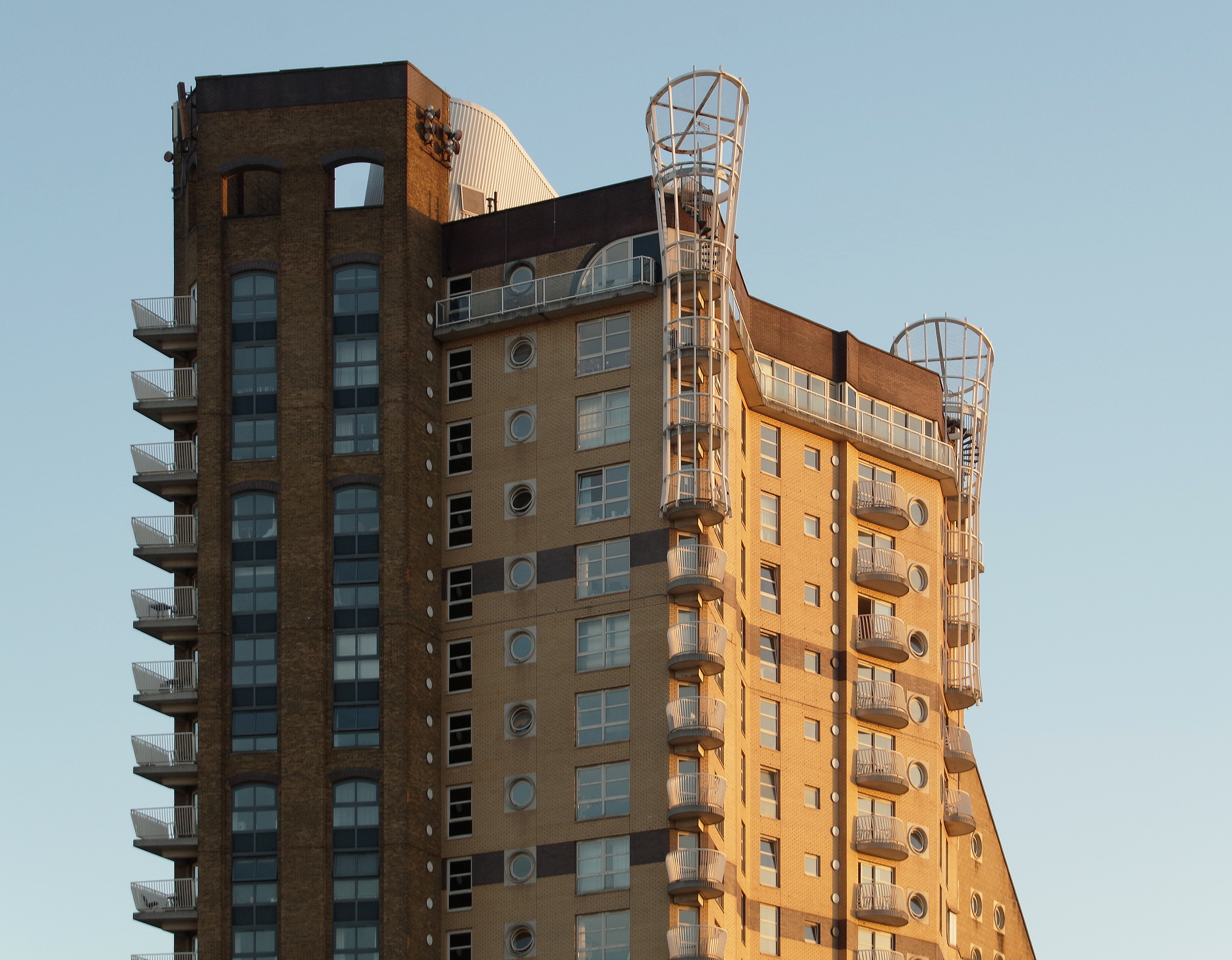
October 2014.

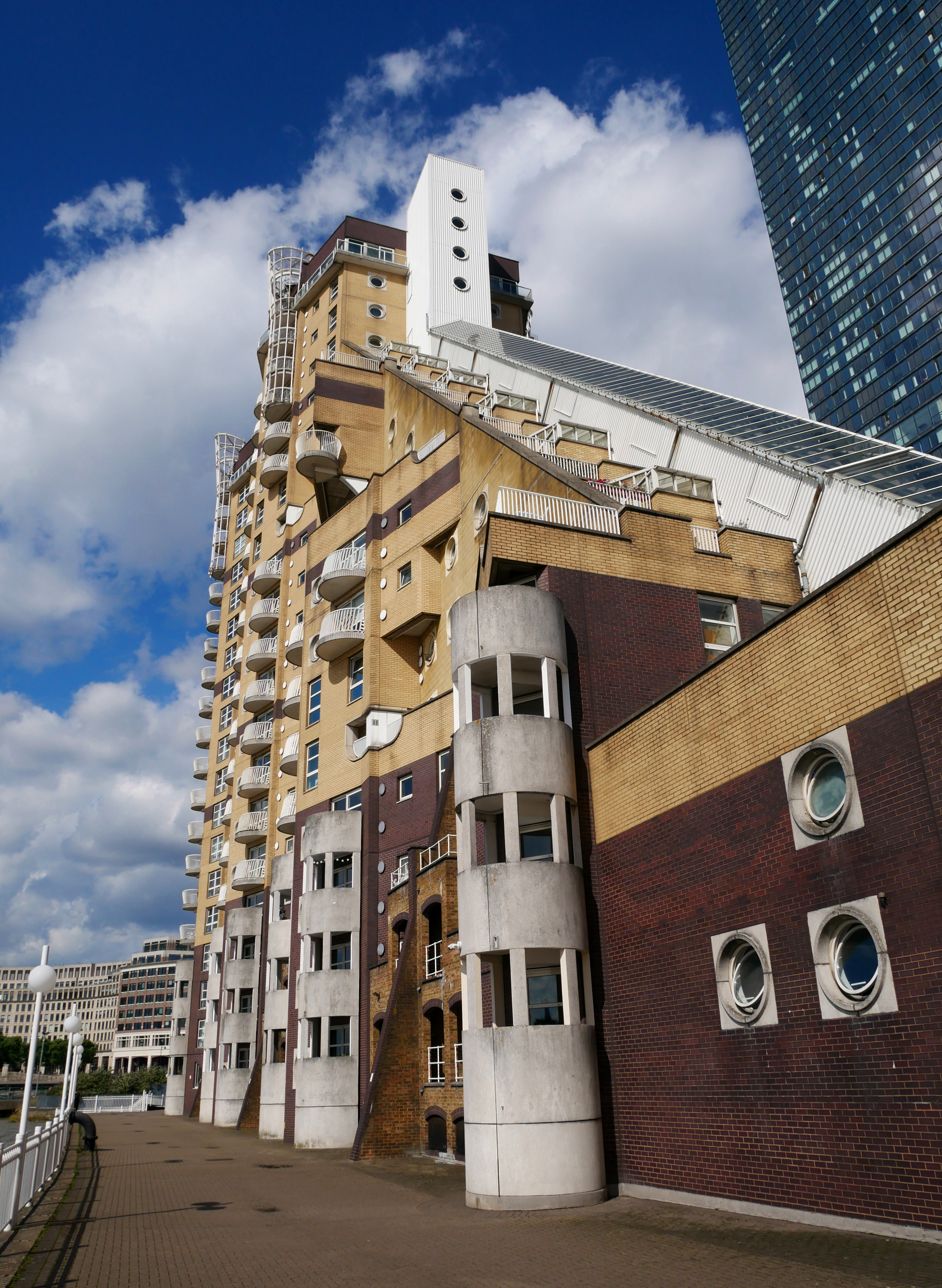
Southwest View of the Cascades. August 2021.

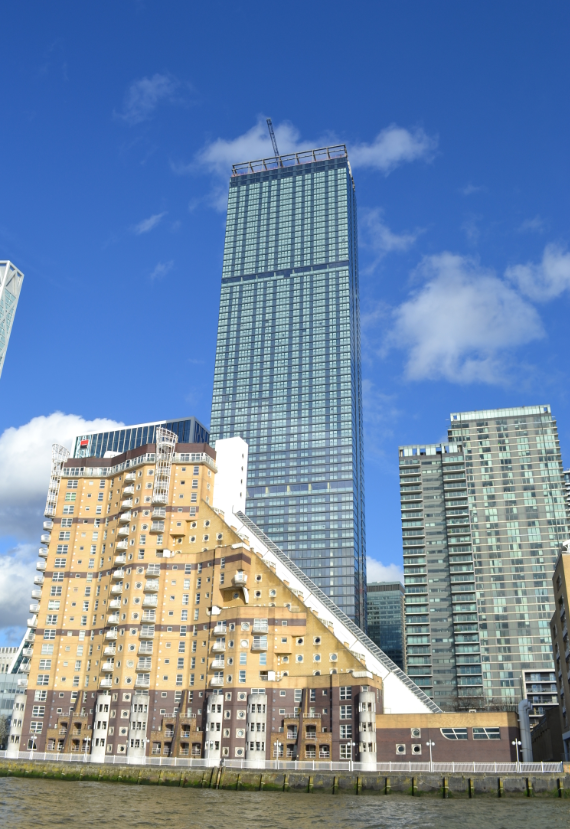
Cascades, Landmark Pinnacle, Landmark West and East Towers. February 2020
