= Piers Gough =

British architect (born 1946)

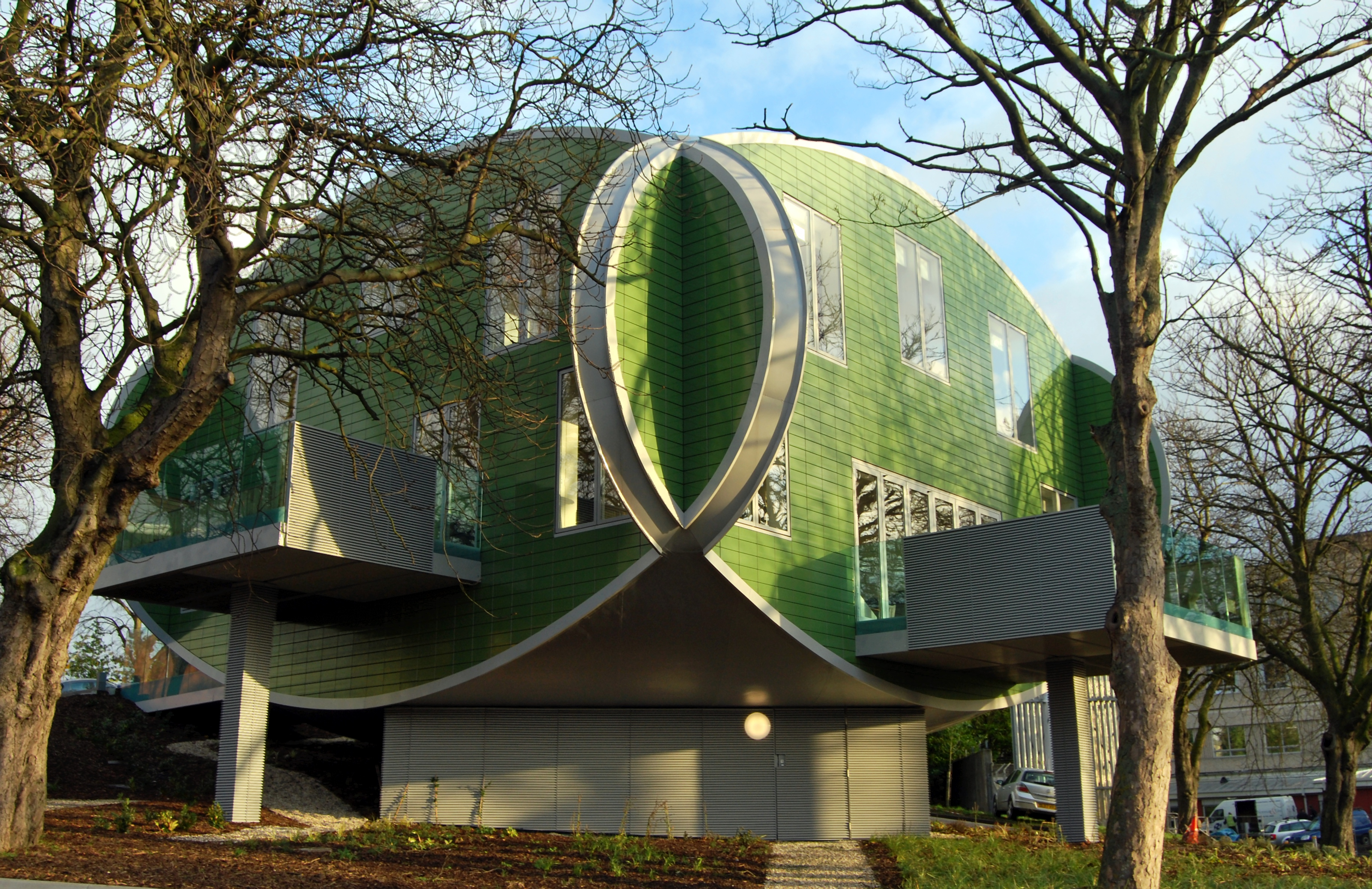
Maggies Cancer Care Centre at Nottingham City Hospital, designed by Piers Gough & CZWG

Piers Gough CBE RA HonFRIAI (born 24 April 1946) is an English architect in the practice CZWG. His younger brothers are the composer Orlando Gough and Jamie Gough, the University of Sheffield's senior lecturer in Town and Regional Planning.

== Early life and career ==
Gough was born in Brighton and grew up in Hove. He attended Uppingham School, Rutland. He studied at the Architectural Association School of Architecture in London and qualified in 1971.

He co-founded the architectural practice Campbell Zogolovitch Wilkinson and Gough (CZWG), in 1975. While working on his own house in east London in the 1970s, Gough fell through the floor and damaged his spine. The drop was only 10 feet but he was hospitalised for six months and now walks with the aid of a stick.

From 2013, he served on the planning committee of the London Legacy Development Corporation.

== Work ==
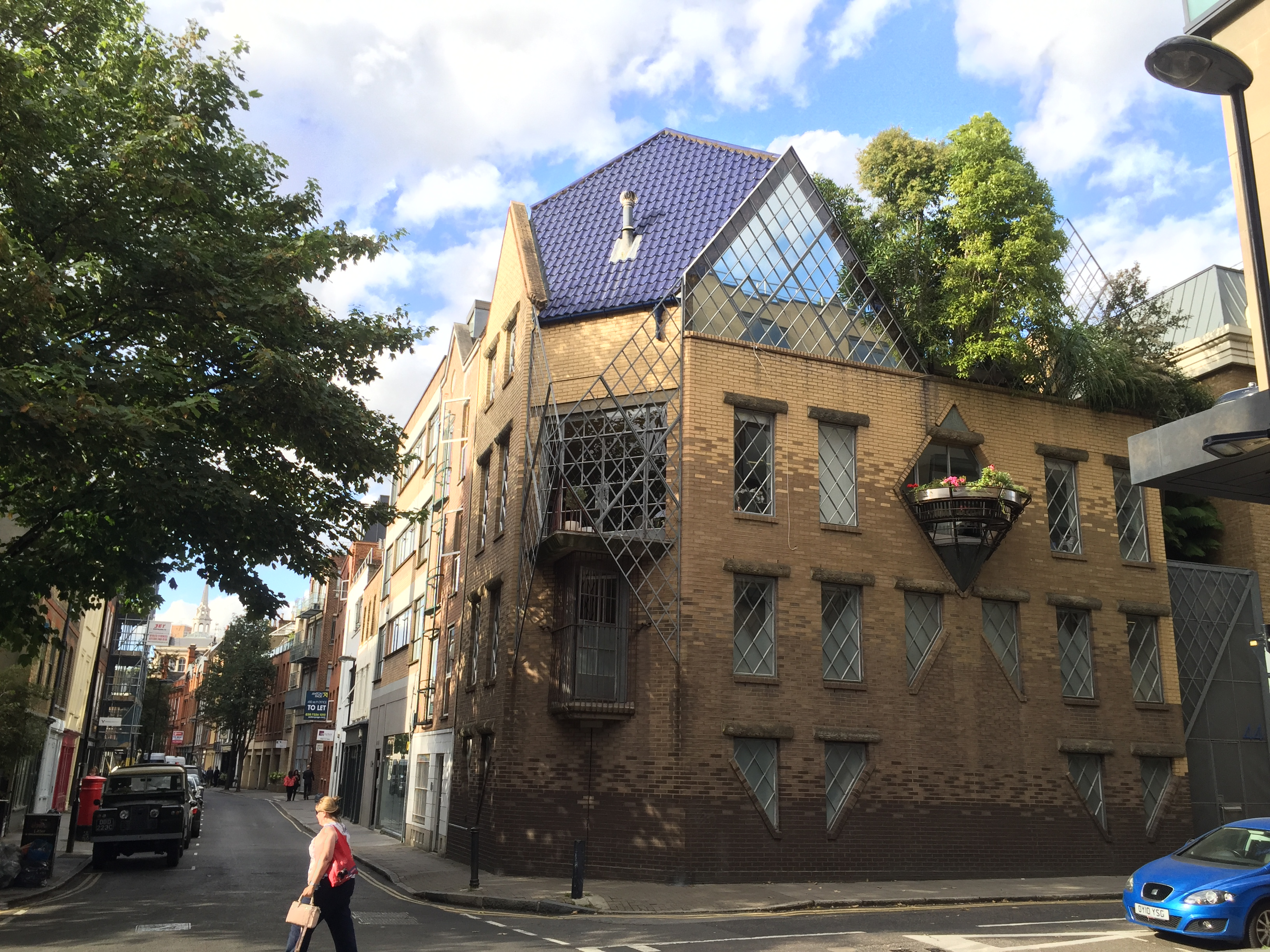
House for Janet Street-Porter at 44 Britton Street, Clarkenwell

Gough made his name with CZWG's work in the redevelopment of the London Docklands (1988).

His projects include:

- 1988: Janet Street-Porter's house, central London;
- 1991: Crown Street regeneration, Glasgow;
- 1993: Westbourne Grove public lavatories, west London;
- 1994: Brindley Place Cafe, Birmingham;
- 2000: Green Bridge, Mile End Park, east London;
- 2011: Maggie's Centre, Nottingham;
- 2011: Canada Water Library, Southwark; 2011.

Gough was listed in the 2018 London Evening Standard's "Progress 1000: London's most influential people" (Visualisers: Architecture).

== Honours ==
Gough was appointed a Commander of the Order of the British Empire (CBE) for services to architecture in the 1998 Birthday Honours, and was elected a Royal Academician in 2002. In 2019 he was made an Honorary Fellow of the Royal Institute of the Architects of Ireland.
