= Chelsea Barracks =

Former British Army barracks in London

- London
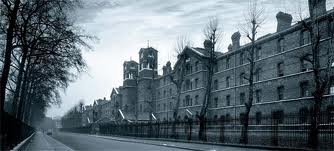
- Chelsea Barracks circa 1870

Site information
- Type: Residential (Former Army Barracks)
- Owner: Qatari Diar

Location
- Location within London
- Coordinates: 51°29′20″N 00°09′11″W

Site history
- Built: 1860–1862
- Built for: War Office
- In use: 1862–2008

Chelsea Barracks was a British Army barracks located in the City of Westminster, London, between the districts of Belgravia, Chelsea and Pimlico on Chelsea Bridge Road. The barracks closed in the late 2000s, and the site is currently being redeveloped for residential use by Qatari Diar, a subsidiary of the Qatar Investment Authority (QIA).

== History ==
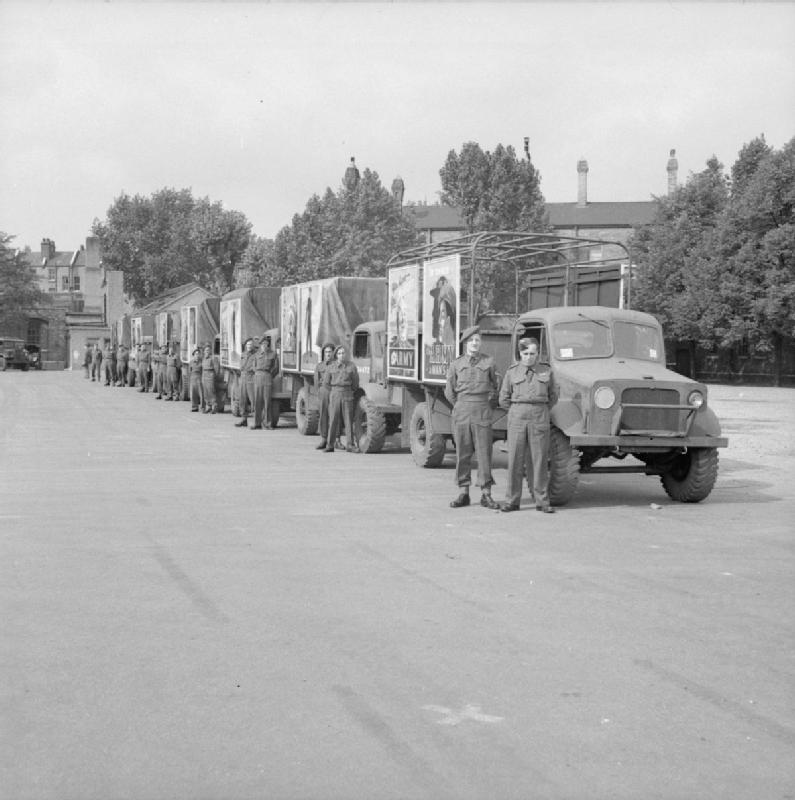
Lorries of a mobile recruiting team lined up at Chelsea Barracks during the Second World War

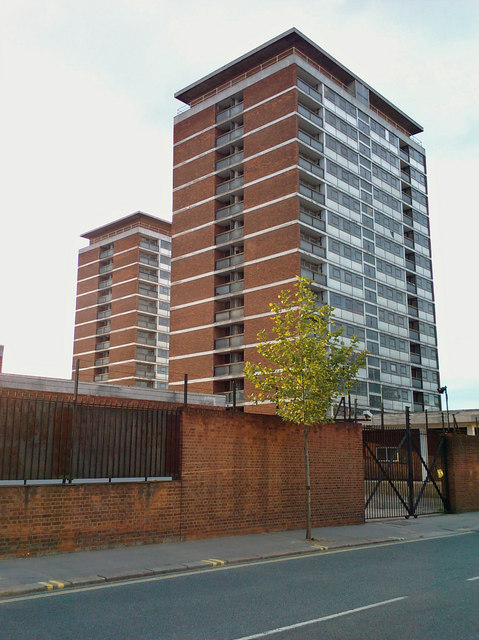
The 1960s tower blocks at Chelsea Barracks just before demolition in 2008

Chelsea Barracks, Stanford's Map Of Central London 1897

The original barracks, designed by George Morgan to house two battalions of infantry, were completed in 1862. The barracks comprised a long and monotonous brick structure broken by towers in the centre. The original arrangement included a chapel, which survives, and the interior of which includes pictures of King David, the Prophet Joshua, Saint John and Saint James, as well as some panels listing the names of soldiers killed in action. It is now a Grade II listed building, used by the King's Foundation for exhibitions and events.

In the late 1950s, the original buildings, excluding the chapel, were demolished, and in June 1960, construction started on two 13-storey concrete tower-blocks designed by Tripe and Wakeham, which were completed in 1962. The tower blocks were used to accommodate four companies from the Guards Regiments. A nail-bomb attack on the barracks by the Provisional Irish Republican Army on 10 October 1981 killed two civilians and injured up to 50.

== Development of the site ==
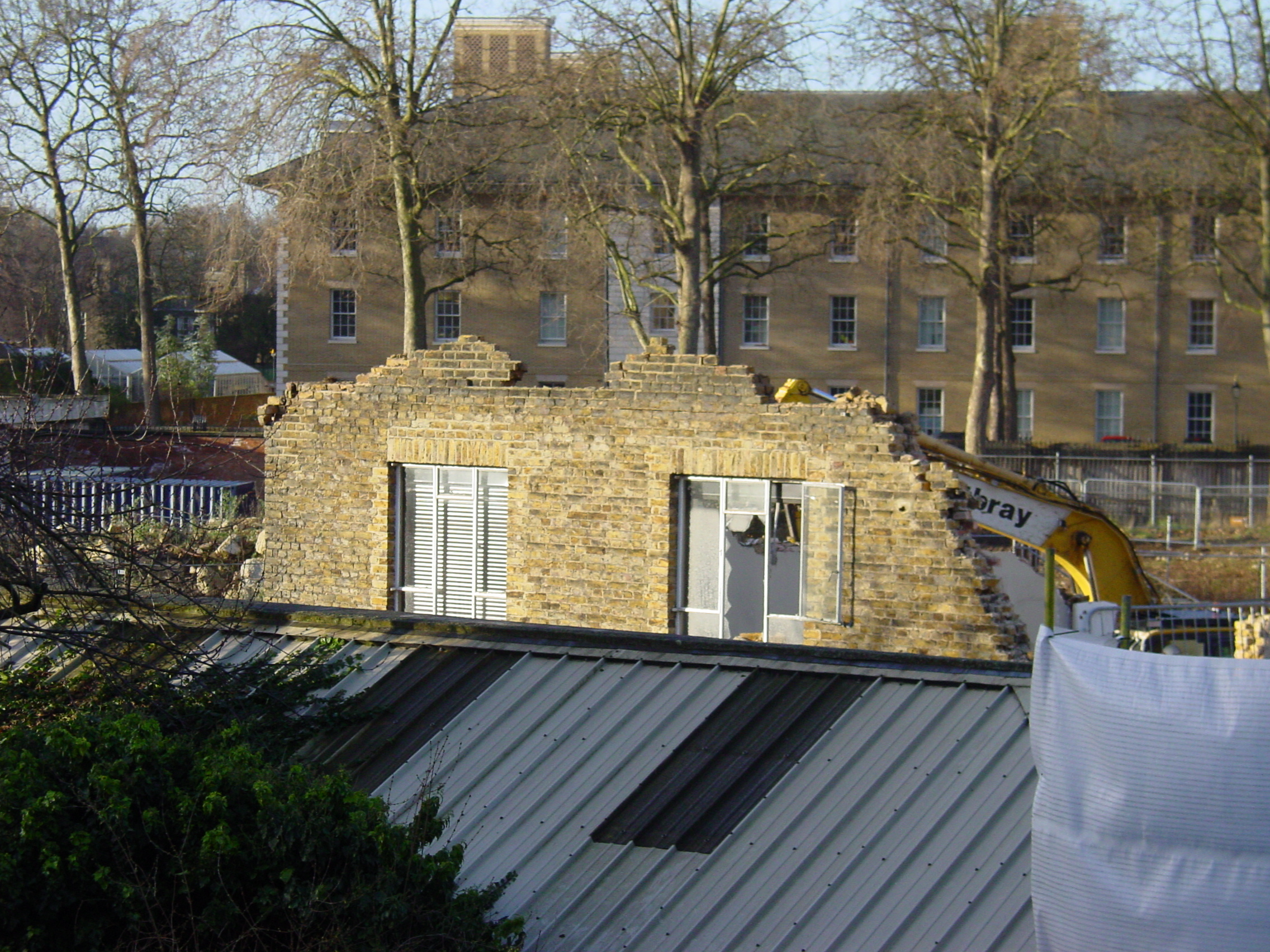
The Chelsea Barracks in the final stages of its demolition with The Baroness Thatcher Infirmary of the Royal Hospital, Chelsea, in the background

On 6 September 2005 Secretary of State for Defence, John Reid, announced that Chelsea Barracks would be sold. He described it as needing extensive renovations. The site was vacated in 2008 with the troops transferred to the Royal Artillery Barracks at Woolwich. The site was part of the Ministry of Defence's Project MoDEL that saw it and five other sites across London sold off, mainly for housing.

Westminster City Council published its draft planning brief for the Chelsea Barracks site in September 2006. It included a commitment to develop 50% of the site with affordable housing. A Community Forum was established by local residents in April 2006 with the support of Secretary of State for Work and Pensions, John Hutton MP, to campaign for greater transparency in the sale of the barracks site and for the 50% affordable homes commitment to be realised.

=== 2007 sale ===
The barracks is in one of London's most expensive residential areas and was originally expected to sell for £250 million. In April 2007 the Ministry of Defence agreed to sell Chelsea Barracks in its 12.8 acres (5.2 ha) site for £959 million to a consortium consisting of Qatari Diar and the CPC Group. On 1 February 2008, the joint venture took possession of the site. Subsequently, CPC's interest in the joint venture company, Project Blue Ltd, was acquired by Qatari Diar, which now owns 100% of the site.

=== Withdrawn Richard Rogers scheme ===
In 2008, a proposed scheme for the barracks site – designed by Rogers Stirk Harbour + Partners – was submitted to Westminster Council. The masterplan was a contemporary design with series of copper, glass and concrete pavilions – with 638 residential units including 50% affordable units.

However, the proposal was criticised by Prince Charles, who preferred a more traditional design for the site. The developers Qatari Diar subsequently withdrew the planning application in June 2009. Richard Rogers publicly criticised the Prince's intervention following the withdrawal.

In May 2010, some of the developers made an £81 million claim at the High Court, blaming Prince Charles for the withdrawal of a planning application. The claim was later reduced to £68 million. The High Court ruled that Qatari Diar breached a contract with developers CPC Group when it withdrew Richard Rogers' Chelsea Barracks scheme. The High Court handed a partial victory to property development firm CPC Group, who demanded compensation after plans to redevelop London's Chelsea Barracks were shelved. Christian and Nick Candy blamed an intervention by Prince Charles for giving their partners, Qatari Diar, cold feet. Prince Charles was quoted as saying the Chelsea Barracks project would be "a gigantic experiment with the very soul of our capital city" and went on saying "it should be scrapped in favour of something more old-fashioned". High Court judge, Mr. Justice Vos ruled that Charles' intervention in the design of the project was immediately recognised and raised serious political issues that needed to be dealt with at the highest level, inferring that Charles had intervened unlawfully.

=== New masterplan ===
A new masterplan – designed by Squire and Partners – was approved by Westminster Council in 2011. The site was due to be built over multiple phases over several years. The scheme will have 448 residential units including 123 affordable units (27%), as well as a new leisure centre, NHS medical centre, community centre and local shops.

In May 2014, Westminster Council granted detailed planning consent for the first phase of the scheme, consisting of 68 apartments across three eight-storey blocks and includes five new garden squares. Construction on this first phase began in 2015. Residents began to move into the development in October 2019.
