= Squire and Partners =

British architectural firm

Squire and Partners LLP
- Industry: Architecture
- Predecessor: Michael Squire Associates
- Founded: 1976 in London
- Founder: Michael Squire
- Headquarters: London
- Website: squireandpartners.com

Squire and Partners is a British architectural firm founded in 1976 known for designing and executing buildings on key sites in London and internationally.

== History ==
The firm was founded by Michael Squire in 1976. Following his death in 2023, Squire and Partners announced a restructure in 2024 which saw the forming of a new leadership team. The practice is currently led by senior partners Henry Squire (son of Michael Squire) and Tim Gledstone, alongside partners Bettina Brehler, Maria Cheung, Olga Gomez, Alessandro Mangiavacchi, Michael Poots and Clelia Filipe.

== Projects ==
Office projects include headquarters for the British fashion brand Reiss and Britain's largest public trade union UNISON HQ, Central London developments at 5 Hanover Square, and 11 Baker Street, and interiors at the Stratton Street offices in Mayfair, London. Office redevelopments include the Grade II-listed Space House in Covent Garden, the Grade II*-listed 78 St James's Street in Mayfair, and an old Edwardian department building in Brixton redesigned as its own offices alongside community spaces and a members' club for local residents.

Masterplans include sites at One Tower Bridge, Chelsea Barracks, West India Quay, the Shell Centre on the Southbank, and the St. John's Wood Square redevelopment of St John's Wood Barracks.

Hotel projects include Bulgari Hotel & Residences in London with Antonio Citterio Patricia Viel and Partners, the Rockwell Hotel, and the Hilton Liverpool.

Squire and Partners has designed many of London's "prime presidential" developments including Chelsea Barracks, One Tower Bridge, Clarges Mayfair, Ebury Square, Netherhall Gardens and The Knightsbridge Apartments.

Other projects include an education centre for the British Council in Nairobi where the Visual Arts Department commissioned a site specific work for the new building from artist David Tremlett and Howick Place, an arts based hub of apartments and studios for designer tenants including Tom Ford, Marc Newson and a gallery for Phillips de Pury.

== Project developments ==
Squire and Partners also have their own property and business portfolio, including Urban Golf, which operates three indoor golf venues with golf simulators in Central London, a bar and restaurant at 06 St. Chads Place, mixed-use developments at Northdown Street and Clapham Park Road, The Rockwell Hotel, a house and apartment development on Liverpool Road, and the practice's own offices - previously at 77 Wicklow Street and currently at The Department Store in Brixton, which won an RIBA National Award in 2018. The practice has also developed The Department Store Studios, a neighbourhood coworking building on the site adjacent to The Department Store, which won an RIBA London Award in 2024.

== See also ==
- 22 Marsh Wall (aka The Landmark), Canary Wharf, London
