= Canada Square =

Square at Canary Wharf, London, England

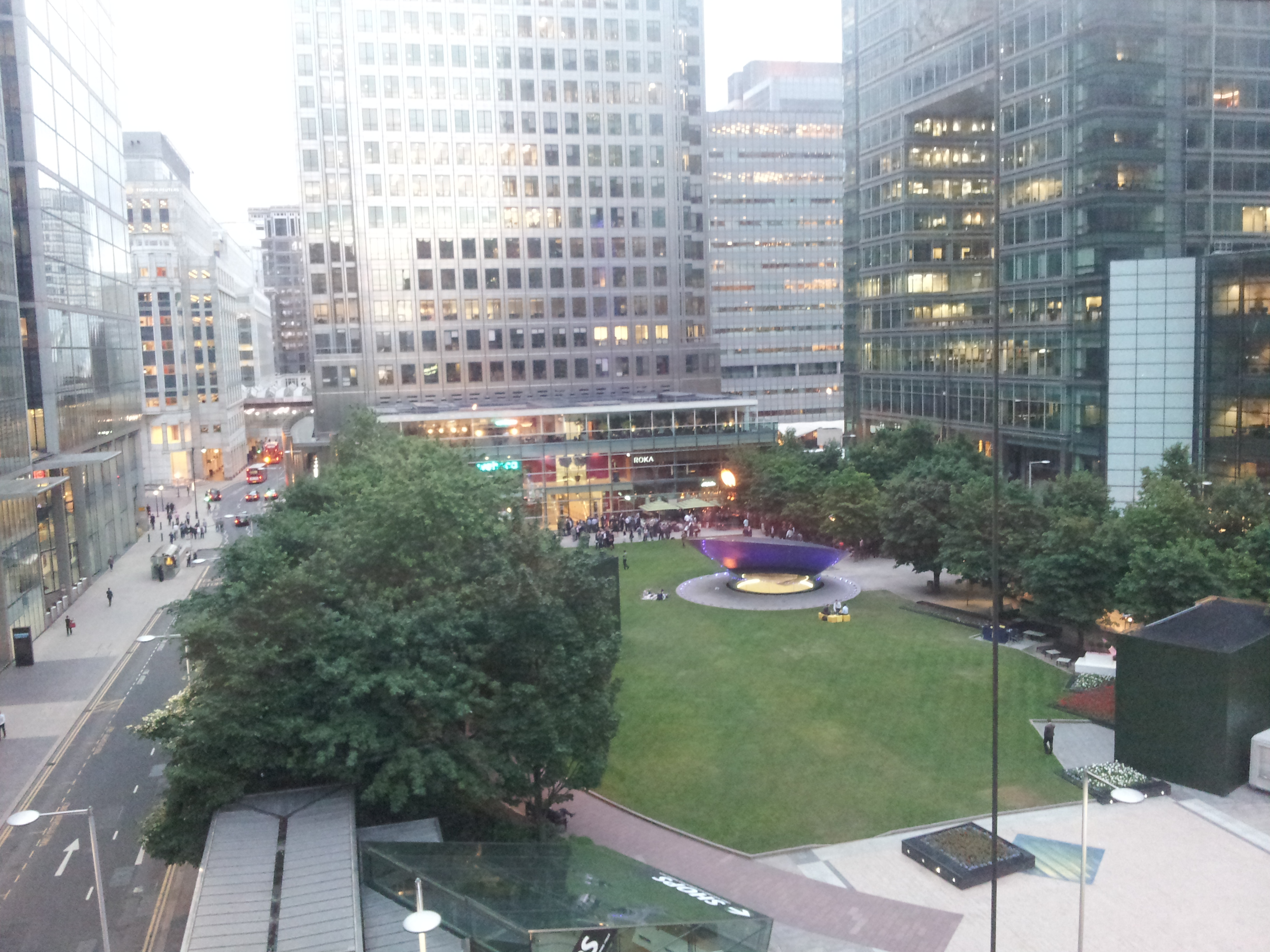
- View of the square in 2013

- Location within London Borough of Tower Hamlets
- Namesake: Canada
- Maintained by: Canary Wharf Group
- Location: Canary Wharf, London, England
- Postal code: E14
- Coordinates: 51.504936°N 0.019423°W

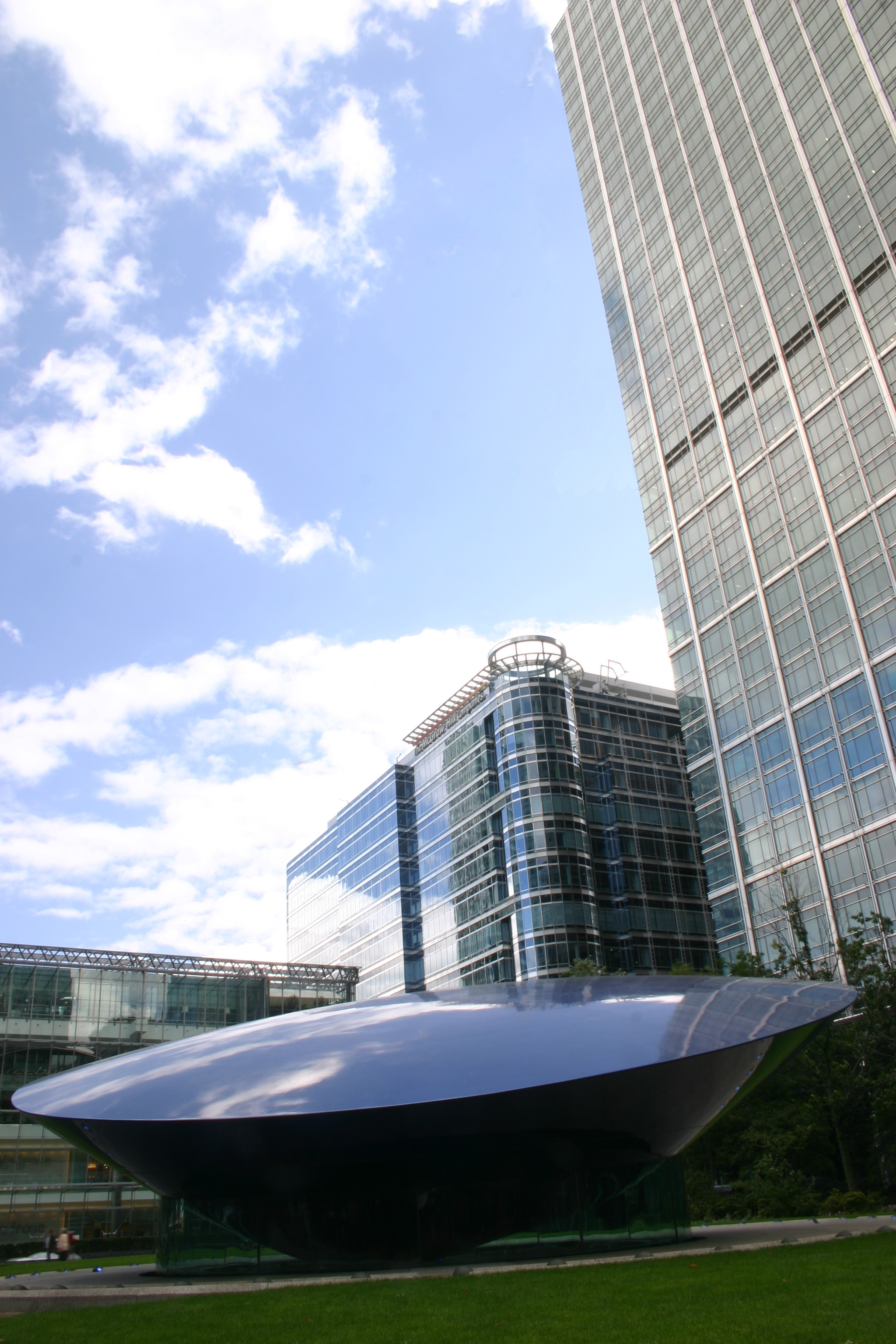
Canada Square looking eastwards

Canada Square is a square at Canary Wharf in the London Borough of Tower Hamlets, located in London. Canada Square is surrounded by three of the tallest buildings in the United Kingdom, including One Canada Square, which was the tallest building in the United Kingdom from 1990 until late 2010, when it was surpassed by The Shard in the London Borough of Southwark.

The complex is named for Canada by Olympia and York, the original developers of the site owned by the Reichmann family of Toronto.

The complex and the square is served by Canary Wharf Underground station on the Jubilee line and Canary Wharf DLR station on the Docklands Light Railway.

== Buildings over 60 metres ==
Ranking by height	Image	Name	Height		Floors	Completion date	Notes
Ranking by height	Image	Name	Metres	Feet	Floors	Completion date	Notes
1		One Canada Square	235	771	50	1991	The 15th-tallest building in Europe and currently the second tallest completed building in the United Kingdom, the tallest being The Shard. Designed by Cesar Pelli, it was the tallest building in Europe upon completion in 1991. Multi-tenanted; occupiers include Currencies Direct, The Bank of New York Mellon, the CFA Institute, Clearstream, EEX (European Energy Exchange), Euler Hermes, the International Sugar Organization, Mahindra Satyam, MetLife, Moody's Analytics and Trinity Mirror.
2=		8 Canada Square	200	655	42	2002	The joint 26th-tallest building in Europe and fifth-tallest completed building in the United Kingdom. Occupied by HSBC as its world headquarters.
2=		25 Canada Square	200	655	42	2001	The joint 26th-tallest building in Europe and fifth-tallest completed building in the United Kingdom. 25 Canada Square and 33 Canada Square together form a single complex known as the Citigroup Centre. Primarily occupied by Citigroup as its EMEA headquarters. Other tenants include 3i Infotech, Lehman Brothers (in Administration), Crossrail, Instinet, Munich Re, MWB Group, SunGard and Wells Fargo.
3		33 Canada Square	105	344	18	1999	33 Canada Square and 25 Canada Square together form a single complex, see above for details.
4		5 Canada Square	88	288	16	2003	Occupied by Bank of America Merrill Lynch.
5		15 Canada Square	69	227	15	2010	Office building owned by Kingboard Investors and leased by KPMG.

== See also ==
- Trafalgar Square
- Canary Wharf
