= Citigroup Centre (London) =

Building complex in London, England

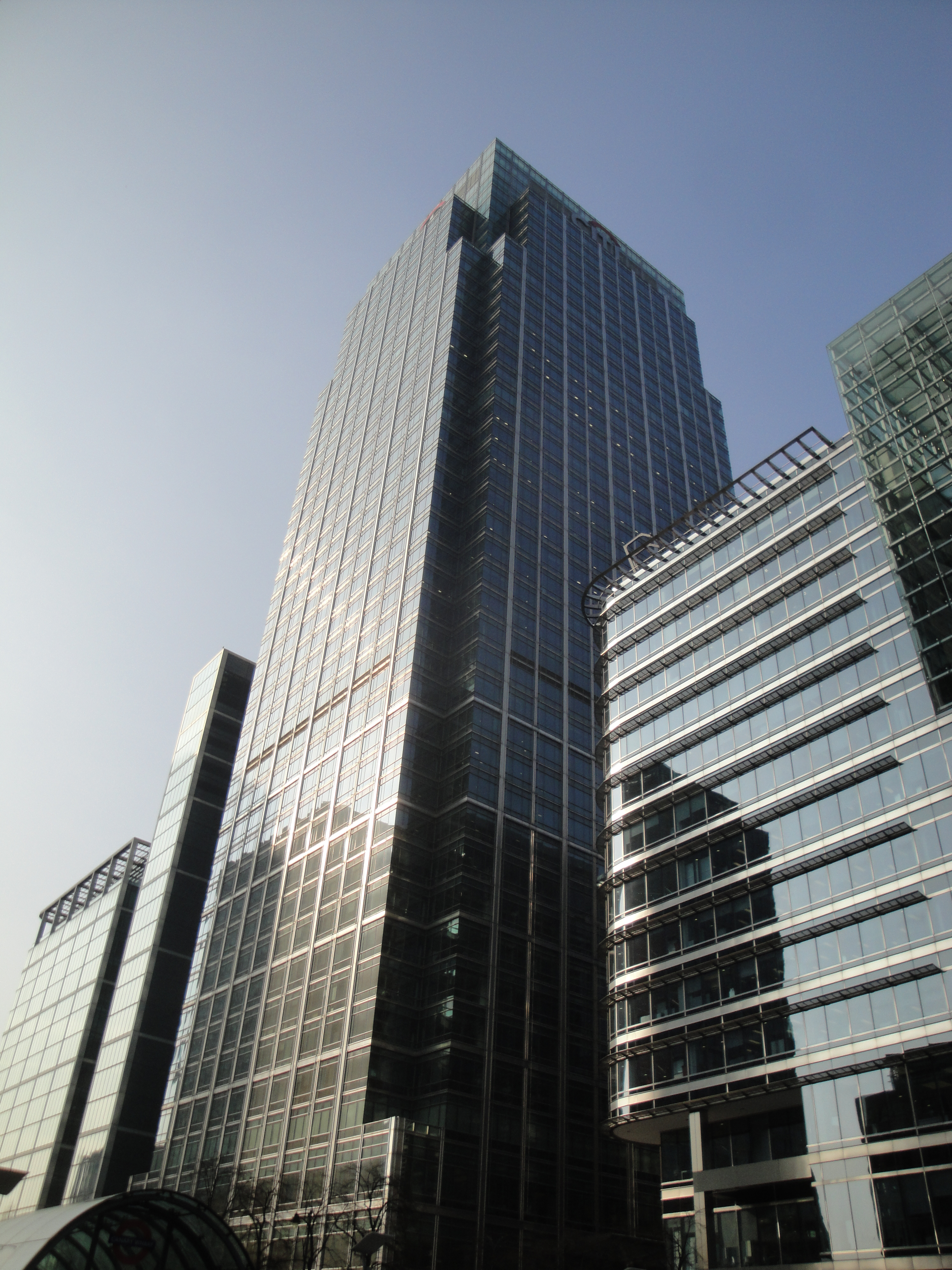
- Interactive map of the Citigroup Centre area

General information
- Type: Commercial
- Location: Canary Wharf; London, E14; United Kingdom
- Coordinates: 51°30′14.4″N 0°1′4.1″W
- Construction started: 1998
- Completed: 2001; 25 years ago
- Owner: Citigroup

Height
- Roof: 200 metres (656 ft)

Technical details
- Floor count: 45
- Floor area: 170,000 m^{2} (1,800,000 sq ft)

Design and construction
- Architects: CGC1: Foster and Partners; CGC2: Pelli Clarke Pelli, with Adamson Associates as executive architect

The Citigroup Centre is a building complex in London. It houses Citigroup's EMEA headquarters and is located in Canary Wharf in the city's Docklands. The centre provides 170,000 square metres (1,800,000 sq ft) of floor space across two buildings - 33 Canada Square and 25 Canada Square (Citi Tower), and houses the bulk of Citi's 9,000-strong UK employee base. The buildings were separated in 2023, prior to renovation of 25 Canada Square.

25 Canada Square, stands at 200 metres (656 ft) and, upon its completion in 2001, became the second-tallest building in the United Kingdom (only behind One Canada Square). Designed by César Pelli & Associates with Adamson Associates as executive architect, construction of the 45-storey tower – undertaken by Canary Wharf Contractors – began in 1998 and was completed in 2001, with Citigroup leasing the building from the outset. The building was bought by RBS in 2004 along with 5 Canada Square (leased to Bank of America) for $1.12 billion. Subsequently, on 2 July 2007, 25 Canada Square was individually sold to a joint venture between Quinlan Private and PropInvest for £1 billion (US$2 billion). Citigroup paid £46.5 million a year in rent for the tower, generating a yield of 4.6% to the owners. Citi later bought the tower for £1.2bn in 2019. The east facing side of 25 Canada Square up to level 40 is configured for use by tenants.

33 Canada Square, is the smaller of the two buildings in the complex, designed by Norman Foster and completed in 1999, two years before its neighbour. At 105 metres (344 ft) tall, the building is made up of eighteen floors. The building is owned by Citigroup, and was built before the completion of the Jubilee line extension in late 1999.

In addition to main entrances from both Canada Square and Upper Bank Street, Citigroup Centre is also accessible via underground walkways from Canada Place shopping mall and Canary Wharf London Underground station - served by the Jubilee line. The Centre is also close to DLR stations Canary Wharf and Heron Quays, which provide connections with the City, London City Airport and surrounding areas.

In 2022, plans were announced to refurbish the 25 Canada Square Citi Tower building. The £100m redevelopment would incorporate holistic spaces such as parent rooms, prayer rooms and green spaces including a winter garden. By January 2025, refurbishment costs had escalated to over £1bn; work on site started in July 2023 with completion expected in 2026.

== See also ==
- List of tallest buildings and structures in London
- List of tallest buildings and structures in Great Britain
