= One Canada Square =

Skyscraper in Canary Wharf, London

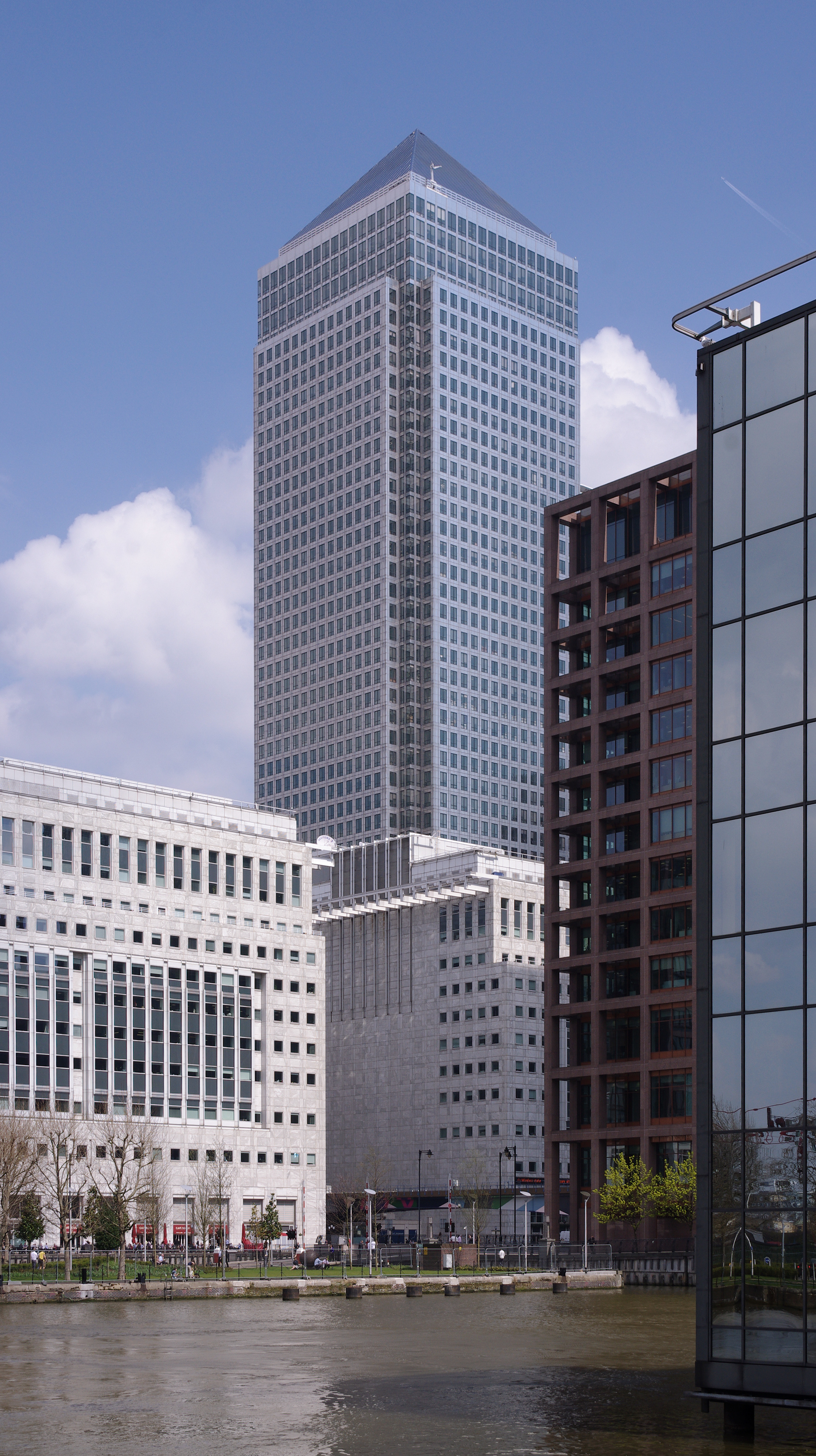
- One Canada Square in London

Record height
- Tallest in United Kingdom from 1990 to 2012^{[I]}
- Preceded by: NatWest Tower
- Surpassed by: The Shard

General information
- Type: Commercial
- Location: Canary Wharf; London, England
- Coordinates: 51°30′18″N 0°01′10.6″W
- Construction started: 1988
- Completed: 1991
- Cost: £624 million
- Owner: Canary Wharf Group plc (current majority shareholder is Songbird Estates plc)
- Operator: Canary Wharf Group plc

Height
- Architectural: 770 ft (235 m)AGL; 800 ft (240 m) ASL

Technical details
- Floor count: 50
- Floor area: 1,224,142 sq ft (113,726.5 m^{2})
- Lifts/elevators: 37

Design and construction
- Architects: César Pelli & Associates; Adamson Associates Architects; Frederick Gibberd Coombes & Partners
- Developer: Olympia & York
- Structural engineer: MS Yolles & Partners; Winston Group; Waterman Partnership
- Main contractor: Sir Robert McAlpine; Ellis Don; Lehrer McGovern; Bovis; Balfour Beatty; Olympia & York + approximately 40 sub-contractors

Website
- onecanadasquare.co.uk

One Canada Square is a skyscraper in Canary Wharf, London. It is the third tallest building in the United Kingdom at 770 feet (235 m) above ground level, and contains 50 floors. It achieved the title of the tallest building in the UK upon completion in 1991 and held the title for 21 years until the completion of The Shard (310m) in 2012.

== Background ==
One Canada Square was designed by César Pelli with Adamson Associates and Frederick Gibberd Coombes. The building is clad with stainless steel. One of the predominant features of the building is the pyramid roof, which contains a flashing aircraft warning light, a rare feature for buildings in the United Kingdom. The distinctive pyramid pinnacle is 800 feet (240 m) above sea level.

One Canada Square is primarily used for offices, though there are some retail units on the lower ground floor. There is no observation floor. It is a prestigious location for offices and as of October 2017 was completely let. The building is recognised as a London landmark, and it has gained much attention through film, television, and other media as one of the tallest buildings in the United Kingdom.

The ground floor, foyer area and basement levels of One Canada Square are open to the general public, having an underground retail area and a transport interchange from Canary Wharf tube and Docklands Light Railway stations. Access from the basement also links to Canada Square shopping mall. The ground floor lobby has a restaurant and bar, the current tenant is Shutters.

There is currently no public observation floor. However, there was an exception from 12 October 1992 to 15 December 1992, when bankruptcy administrators for Olympia & York Canary Wharf Limited opened the 50th floor to the public, to maintain interest in Canary Wharf. The scheme was stopped on 15 December 1992 when the IRA attempted to bomb the tower.

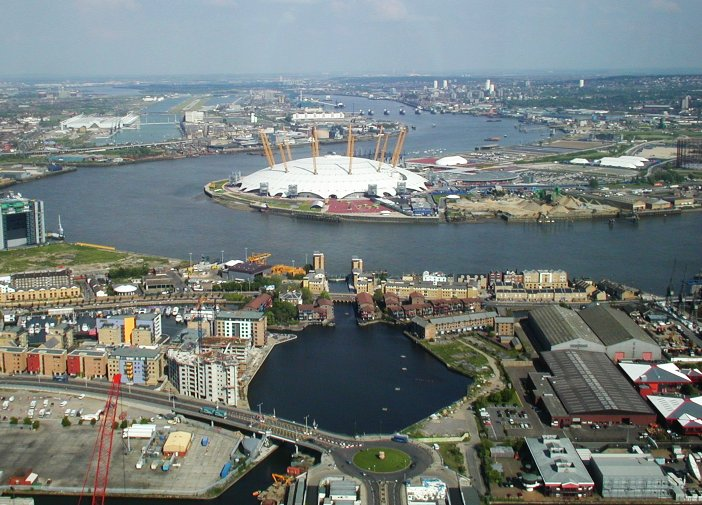
A view from the top floor, May 2000

== History ==
=== 1987–1990: Design and construction ===
The original plans for a business district on Canary Wharf came from G Ware Travelstead. He proposed three 260 m (850 ft) towers. Travelstead was unable to fund the project, so the plans were sold to Olympia & York in 1987. Olympia & York grouped all three towers into an area known as Docklands Square, and the main tower was designated DS7 during planning. Docklands Square was later renamed Winston Square before finally being renamed as Canada Square.

The architects chosen to design One Canada Square were César Pelli & Associates, Adamson Associates, and Frederick Gibberd Coombes & Partners. They designed the tower with a similar shape to 200 Vesey Street (formerly Three World Financial Center), New York City, which was also developed by Olympia & York and designed by Argentine architect César Pelli. The shape was also made reminiscent of "Big Ben". Olympia & York wanted to clad One Canada Square in stone, just like Peli's World Financial Center towers constructed in 1986, but the architects first wanted to use aluminium for its low density, before insisting on steel to reflect Britain's heritage as an industrial nation. The final steel clad chosen was Patten Hyclad Cambric-finish stainless-steel.

Commenting on the reason for choosing steel for the clad:

"We studied the cladding material carefully and chose stainless steel with a linen finish because it seemed to fit the atmosphere of London."

—César Pelli, architect (2016)

One Canada Square was originally designed to be 864 feet (263 m) high at 55 storeys, but that penetrated the permitted projection height of the flight obstruction area of the airport approach district to London City Airport, but this was extended to a height of 30 feet (9.1 m) above kerb level in consideration of the fact that One Canada Square was on the external zone of the airport approach. To comply with air traffic safety regulations, the architects took five floors off the tower. The final height of 824 feet (251 m) was permitted, otherwise, the developers would have had to dismantle what was necessary to fit the height restriction. After losing five floors, Olympia & York insisted the other floors had to make up the lost floor space by increasing mass to the remaining floor space which created a tower that was not as slim as Pelli desired. Pelli and the other architects proposed alternatives, such as building more floors below ground and creating an extension of the tower into Docklands Square, which were similar ideas based upon previous Olympia & York buildings, though the ideas were rejected as it did not fit the basis of prime office space.

The design of the tower received a fair share of criticism. According to César Pelli, the most damaging criticism came from Prince Charles, who said on national television, "I personally would go mad if I had to work in a place like that". Other criticisms came from former Prime Minister Margaret Thatcher, who said that the building was "not quite stunning".

Construction on the tower began in 1988. Construction was given to Sir Robert McAlpine & Sons in association with EllisDon of Toronto, but they were slow at building the tower, partly due to building workers going on strike in the summer of 1989, so Lehrer McGovern took over. Lehrer McGovern contracted out most of the work to Balfour Beatty because the Canary Wharf Tower was a difficult building to build. In total, about 27,500 metric tonnes of British steel and 500,000 bolts were used during construction. Construction also involved building a huge cofferdam to seal construction from water. It also involved driving 222 piles into the ground at 23 metres deep. Also, a 4-metre thick concrete raft was sunk into the dock to act as anchor.

By June 1990, the tower had overtaken Tower 42 (previously known as the NatWest Tower), becoming the tallest building in the United Kingdom.

On 8 November 1990, the tower was topped out when the top piece of the pyramid roof was put in place by crane.

The celebration was attended by many famous architects, recognised engineers and political leaders. Amongst them were César Pelli, Brian Mulroney, Peter Rice, Man-Chung Tang, and Margaret Thatcher. Paul Reichmann, the owner of Olympia & York gave credit to Pelli for his building design as "this inauguration symbolises the spirit with which buildings can be achieved". Margaret Thatcher told the distinguished audience that the tower can become a "national recognised landmark".

=== 1990–2000: Opening and early years ===
In August 1991, One Canada Square was completed and open for business. His Royal Highness The Duke of Edinburgh officially opened One Canada Square on the morning of 26 August 1991, and unveiled a commemorative plaque at the entrance to the building. Hundreds of construction workers attended the opening ceremony. The Duke of Edinburgh addressed some 800 invited guests, many of whom had been involved in the project. He spoke of the "large, airy space and clean, efficient office layout", as he declared the building ready for business. The attendees heard a specially commissioned piece of music performed by a 30-strong choir. Paul Reichmann, Chairman of Olympia & York, said:

"The Canary Wharf Tower marks the start of a new beginning for Canary Wharf, for London, and for the United Kingdom. It is by any standard a triumph of ambition, commitment and collaboration. It will breathe life into Canary Wharf, allowing us to continue our transformation of the rest of the wharf, and will put Canary Wharf at the leading edge of real estate."

—Paul Reichmann, Chairman, Olympia & York (1991)

The majority of the tower was empty after opening because most tenants had not moved in yet and there was a global recession. To brighten up the tower, lights and lasers were installed during the Christmas celebrations of 1991.

On 15 November 1992, the Provisional Irish Republican Army attempted to place a large improvised explosive device near the tower. The IRA had already worked out that to cause maximum damage, the bomb had to be placed under the Docklands Light Railway bridge to disrupt infrastructure near One Canada Square for a devastating effect. The bomb was in a van which was driven to the designated place. As the bombers were about to make their escape, security guards approached the van because it was parked illegally on double yellow lines. Two men got out of the vehicle and one pointed a revolver at one of the security guards. The gun failed to fire. The terrorists were then pursued as far as the boundary of the wharf, but they escaped. Armed police were on the scene within minutes and the army bomb squad discovered that the vehicle contained a bomb. The detonator failed to ignite the main charge, and the bomb did not go off, so there was no bomb damage to Canary Wharf. The wharf was sealed off for a couple of days whilst an intensive search took place for further devices. A few days later, the IRA described it as 'sheer ill luck' as the bomb failed to detonate. There was criticism that the intelligence services did not know about this massive bomb travelling through London.

On 9 February 1996, the Provisional IRA successfully detonated a large bomb at South Quay, south of Canary Wharf (outside Canary Wharf), which killed two people and devastated several buildings. This explosion is commonly, but erroneously, referred to as the "Canary Wharf bomb".

=== 2000–present: Park Pavilion ===
In 2009, the building was extended with Park Pavilion, a two-story glass structure built on the east side of the building, designed by César Pelli and Koetter Kim. The extension replaced the stainless steel columns, car parking spaces and road leading to Canada Square. The extension was made to create more retail space at street level, where five tenants were chosen to occupy the space: four restaurants and Lloyds Bank. The extension's roof terrace is open to diners and contains a green roof having sedum moss.

A terrorist plot was confirmed on 4 April 2008, when a terror cell appeared at Woolwich Crown Court accused of targeting Canary Wharf. The men denied the charges, but were found guilty for planning attacks on the Canary Wharf skyscrapers.

== Technical details ==
=== Pyramid roof ===
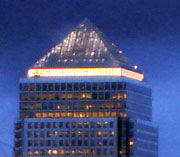
The pyramid roof at night

The pyramid roof is an important feature of the building, enclosing a maintenance plant and housing facilities for water supply and window washing, and an aircraft warning beacon. The pyramid itself is 40 metres high and 30 metres square at the base. It is made from stainless steel and is held together by 100,000 nuts and bolts, with a weight of more than 100 tons. A louvre access door opens to allow a shining beacon to identify the building to passing aircraft.

The pyramid is metal louvres that are self-cleaning with rainwater.

Architect César Pelli commented on his pyramid design:

"The pyramidal form makes a three-dimensional building of what would otherwise be just folded planes. It also strengthens the Axis Mundi, the vertical line that goes through skyscrapers and connects Heaven with Earth. This connection has been recognised in many cultures for several centuries now." —César Pelli, architect (2016)

Canary Wharf: Aircraft warning lights

The pyramid roof lights up in the evenings and can be seen 20 miles (32 km) away. It is a permanent lighting of the One Canada Square pyramid using a thousand electronically controlled fluorescent tubes capable of sequence programming for special occasions and festive seasons.

=== Windows ===
One Canada Square has 3,960 windows and was one of the first buildings to incorporate metallicised windows and other advanced window technologies, to assist with the building's energy efficiency plans. The tower uses super-insulated windows at triple-pane glazing (with a high solar heat-gain coefficient), low-emissivity (low-e) coatings to prevent heat loss in winter months, UV coatings, scratch resistant outer layers, sealed argon / krypton gas filled inter-pane voids, "warm edge" insulating glass spacers, air-seals and specially developed thermally designed window frames. The windows were manufactured with high R-values [low U-values, 0.90 W/(m^{2}.K)] for the time; therefore, the thermal resistance is one of the highest rated in the world for the entire window including the frame.

=== Fire system ===
In the event of a fire, One Canada Square is not fully evacuated. The floor that has the fire and all other floors above are evacuated. The air conditioning is set to work in reverse to extract smoke and fresh air is blown into the fire escape staircases to increase air pressure and therefore slow the entry of smoke into these areas. The sprinkler system will not operate unless there is sufficient heat acting on any sprinkler head, which are independent of each other and do not operate in unison.

The only time when One Canada Square was fully evacuated was on 30 October 2001, during a test drill in response to the 11 September 2001 attacks. The test drill was unsuccessful as tenants were notified beforehand, hence evacuation was much quicker than expected by Canary Wharf Security.

=== Tuned mass damper ===
One Canada Square has a steel pendulum that serves as a tuned mass damper. The pendulum sways to offset movements in the building caused by strong gusts of wind. The building can sway 33.02 centimetres (13 inches) in the strongest winds.

=== Lobby ===
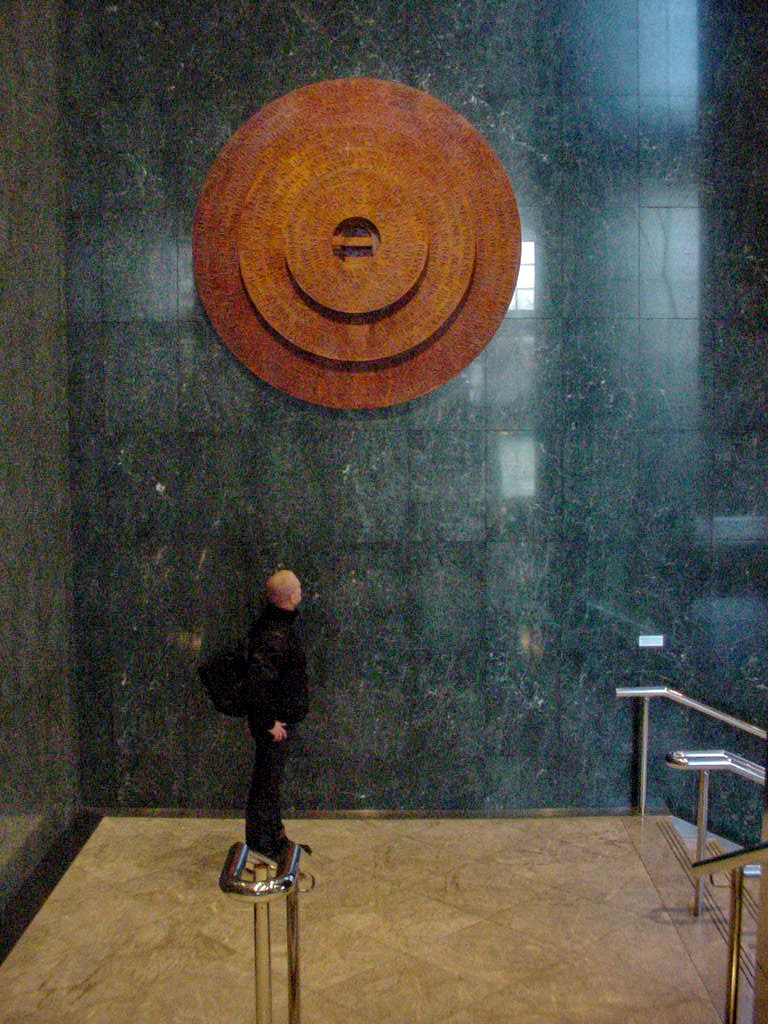
One of the tondi of The 20th Century–Thames (Keith Milow, 1998)

The lobby is 36 feet (11 m) high, clad in 90,000 square feet (8,000 m^{2}) Italian Rosso Levanto and Verde Imperial Guatemalan marbles imported from Italy, Guatemala and Turkey.

The marble clad under steel ceilings gives the impression of:

"Rather than entering a corporate reception, you feel as if you're entering a hushed antespace of timeless power."

—Herbert Wright, Johnny Tucker, Journalist [architecture] (2016)

In February 2017, security in the lobby was extended to include security screens to prevent unauthorised entry to the lifts. This was a follow-up to YouTuber Night Scape gaining unauthorised entry from the lobby to the roof.

=== Lifts ===
The tower has thirty-two lifts for tenants to use, where eight lifts serve roughly ten floors of the building. All tenant passenger lifts serve the ground floor and the following groups of floors – floors 5–17, floors 18–28, floors 28–39 and floors 39–50 (note that level 5 is the first office floor and there is no level 13). In addition there are 2 firemen's lifts which serve all floors in the building. These have colour designations, with blue being in the northeast core of the building and green being in the southwest. From the building's initial construction until late 2009 there were two large freight lifts at which point another was added. This lift was built inside a vacant lift shaft and has the designation GL37 (GL for goods lift and 37, as it is the 37th lift in the building). The tower uses "Gearless Traction Elevators" by Otis. These lifts were installed in 1990 (aside from GL37 – 2009) using a gearless traction machine. They have woven steel cables called hoisting ropes that are attached to the top of the lift cabin and wrapped around the drive sheave in special grooves. The other ends of the cables are attached to a counterweight that moves up and down in the hoistway on its own guiderails. It takes 40 seconds by lift from lobby to top floor

=== Environmental rating ===
The international BREEAM standard has awarded One Canada Square for best practice in sustainable design and environmental performance for buildings. To achieve the rating, the building had to meet or exceed a challenging score of 85% against strict criteria, and included environmental innovations such as the use of 80% recycled aggregate within the concrete used, and the recycling of waste heat to cool and warm the building. Aggregates used in the office build were from predominantly recycled sources, part of a strategy to integrate sustainable products and materials throughout the site, delivering both affordable and sustainable environmentally friendly features to the building.

One Canada Square energy performance has improved by decreasing 30% from 2007 to 2016 by initiatives such as installing LEDs and upgrading HVAC and water services.

== Artwork ==
There is artwork on display in the lobby. This includes the stained glass and the roundel in the foyer were designed by Charles Rennie, and are an original design. The design represents Canary Wharf, Water and Boats, illustrating the signs of London Docklands. The slate used here and in various places around the foyer on site is made from the Welsh slate shelving used in the repositories of the original Banana Warehouse at Canary Wharf.

The staircases in the four corners of the lobby leading down to the basement floor were originally embellished with a four-piece commissioned sculpture, The 20th Century–Thames by Keith Milow. Around 2014, one of the tondi was removed to make room for a restaurant. The other three remain in situ.

Other art works on display included Sergio Germariello's Guerrieri (Warriors) 2013, which is displayed in the lobby. The work is an aluminium laser cut out that has been painted.

Blade of Venus 1985, by William Turnbull, is on display, part of a series of bronzes that originated in the shape of Japanese swords and Chinese chopping knives.

Lawson Oyekan's Trail With Light (LIP) Series 1998, are terracotta vessels on permanent display. The concept is that it is supposed to reflect emotional experience and look as if they have been exploded and put back together again.

=== Temporary artwork ===
The lobby is also used for temporary art displays. In 2017, the artist Richard Rome showed several of his bronze and steel sculptures here. This was followed by an exhibition of bronze sculptures by Auguste Rodin.

Canary Wharf Winter Lights usually are on display during January.

During 16 April – 1 June 2018, the lobby hosted a photography exhibition known as AOP50 (Association of Photographers 50 years celebration). Large photographs were on display by famous photographers. Notable works included:

- Jullian Edelstein, Nelson Mandela, 1997
- Duffy, Jean Shrimpton, 1963
- Spencer Rowell, L'Enfant, 1986
- Tessa Traeger, Chemistry of Light, No 22 and 23, 2012
- Max Forsythe, Hong Kong, c.1995
- Paul Wakefield, Abraham Lake, 2011
- Anderson & low, NDST Sky No. 27, 2001
- Nadav Kander, Silver Salt Lake Utah, 1997

== Tenants ==
=== Current tenants ===
The current office tenants according to Canary Wharf Group plc as at 30 June 2022:

- Adamson Associates
- Article 25
- BBVA (Banco Bilbao Vizcaya Argentaria)
- Bellway Homes
- Brookfield
- Canary Wharf Group plc
- Currencies Direct
- Daihatsu
- Datatonic
- Doctors of the World
- Doyle Clayton
- Equilend
- eToro
- Euler Hermes
- FIA
- Fisher Investments
- Genomics
- Hamro plc
- International Grains Council
- International Hydropower Association
- International Sugar Organization
- Level39
- Medical Defence Union
- Metlife Investments Ltd
- Moody's
- The Office Group
- Pinnacle Wealth Management
- Pirean
- Rational FX | Xendpay
- Reach plc
- Regus | Spaces
- Rittal
- RSVP Media Response
- St James's Place Wealth Management
- Tramontana Asset Management
- UCL School of Management
- Unimoni
- Valero
- INRFX

=== Notable previous tenants ===
- Bear Stearns
- KPMG
- Maersk
- Telegraph Media Group

== Ownership ==
The ownership of One Canada Square has changed since it was constructed. The table below shows who have previously owned One Canada Square, and also who are the current owners.

Any use of a holding company has been excluded from this list, as it is easier to trace the true owner.

Date	Owner
1988–1991	(Building under construction) Olympia & York Canary Wharf Limited (Ultimate parent: Olympia & York Developments Limited)
1991–1992	Olympia & York Canary Wharf Limited (Ultimate parent: Olympia & York Developments Limited)
1992–1992	None (previous owners were in administration due to bankruptcy)
1992–1992	Cheung Kong (Holdings) Limited
1992–1993	None (Return to administration)
1993–1995	Canary Wharf Limited (Parent: Sylvester Investments) (Ultimate parent: a consortium of 11 banks owned by Barclays Bank, CIBC, Chemical Bank, Citibank, Commerzbank, Crédit Lyonnais, Credit Suisse, Kansallis-Osake-Pankki, Lloyds Bank, National Bank of Canada, and Royal Bank of Canada)
1993–1995	Canary Wharf Limited (Parent: Tomcat Investments – transitional use to International Property Corporation Limited) (Ultimate parent: a consortium of 5 banks owned by Citibank, Commerzbank, Crédit Lyonnais, Credit Suisse, and Royal Bank of Canada)
1995–1999	Canary Wharf Limited (Parent: International Property Corporation Limited) (Ultimate parent: a consortium owned by CNA Financial Corporation, Franklin Mutual Series Fund, HRH Prince Al Waleed bin Talal bin Abdulaziz al Saud, affiliates of Republic New York Corporation, Paul Reichmann)
1999–2004	Canary Wharf Group plc (public company, no majority shareholder)
2004–2010	Canary Wharf Group plc (public company, majority shareholder is Songbird Estates plc)
2010–2015	British Land
2015–present	Canary Wharf Group plc (public company, 69 percent controlled by Songbird Estates {which have major shareholders being Qatar Investment Authority [QIA], Simon Glick family, China Investment Corporation, Morgan Stanley, Third Avenue, Madison International Realty, EMS} and 22 percent controlled by Brookfield Properties.)

=== Light usage ===
One Canada Square has been "named and shamed" for being the top building to leave the lights on unnecessarily. The research carried out by the BBC's Inside Out programme found that on midnight Sunday, One Canada Square left more lights on than any other building in London.

However, Canary Wharf Group said that some tenants have staff working around the clock, and 100% of the energy comes from renewable resources.

== Community relations ==
=== Television interference ===
As the Canary Wharf Tower is the first skyscraper to be clad in stainless steel with metallised windows, this may have caused analog television reception interference for local people living in the area. In the case Patricia Hunter and others v. Canary Wharf Ltd.[1997], the House of Lords concluded there is no legal right to receive good television reception. Patricia Hunter and others lost the case because of a variety of reasons that included:

- the BBC built a new relay station so there was no long-term television interference
- it was interference with a purely recreational facility, as opposed to interference with the health or physical comfort or well-being of the plaintiffs
- nothing was emitted from the defendants' land

In Spring 2001, the BBC received some television interference complaints from residents in the Poplar area (north of Canary Wharf). A possible cause for the interference are the other Canary Wharf towers being built. Their advice was to get digital television, satellite or cable.

=== In popular culture ===
==== Cinema ====
One Canada Square has been featured in several films.

- In the high-profile film The World Is Not Enough, James Bond sails past One Canada Square.
- In the 2003 spy comedy film Johnny English, One Canada Square had another identical building next to it, where one of the One Canada Square buildings was a hospital and the other was the headquarters of villain Pascal Sauvage.
- In the 2004 action-thriller film The Bourne Supremacy One Canada Square was used by the Central Intelligence Agency as its London listening station.
- In the 2007 post-apocalyptic horror film 28 Weeks Later, the tower and the surrounding Docklands area are one of the main settings for the film.
- In the 2007 fantasy film Harry Potter and the Order of the Phoenix, Harry Potter and some members of the Order of the Phoenix pass next to One Canada Square as they head to Grimmauld Place on their broomsticks.

Other films featuring the Canary Wharf Tower can be read from a publication called Canary Wharf And Isle of Dogs Movie Map.

==== Television ====
One Canada Square has appeared many times on British television.

- It has appeared in the television series Doctor Who (in the episodes Army of Ghosts and Doomsday), as the location of the Torchwood Institute, under the name "Torchwood Tower". In the episodes, a hall on the top floor contains a hole to a parallel universe that the tower was specifically built to reach.
- It has appeared in the series The Tomorrow People, as the headquarters for Sam Rees.
- The tower also made multiple appearances on the television show The Apprentice.
- The popular BBC soap EastEnders.
- It was also shown as the headquarters of the fictional 'Olympic Deliverance Commission' in the BBC comedy Twenty Twelve, a mockumentary based on the organising committee of the London 2012 Olympic Games. LOCOG, the real-life organising committee of the Games, was in fact based in nearby buildings One Churchill Place, 10 Upper Bank Street and 25 Canada Square.

During the 1990s, One Canada Square was home to the television station L!VE TV, which broadcast live from the tower.

==== Literature ====
- A near future sequence in the novel Freezeframes by Katharine Kerr, shows One Canada Square as a free college and youth drop-in centre. It is nicknamed "Major's Last Erection", referring to John Major.
- One Canada Square previously appeared in the Virgin Missing Adventures novel Millennial Rites in which the top floor was the headquarters of a yuppie who inadvertently turned London into a "dark fantasy" kingdom in which he was a powerful sorcerer, with the tower as his citadel
- The Past Doctor Adventures novel The Time Travellers, in which it was the headquarters of the British Army in an alternate timeline.
- One Canada Square also features prominently in an early issue of the Grant Morrison comic series The Invisibles, in which Dane MacGowan is encouraged to jump from the top by his mentor, Tom O'Bedlam, as an initiation rite that will allow him to see beyond reality and join The Invisibles.

==== Video games ====
- One Canada Square is featured in Sim City 3000 as a placeable landmark.

== Gallery ==
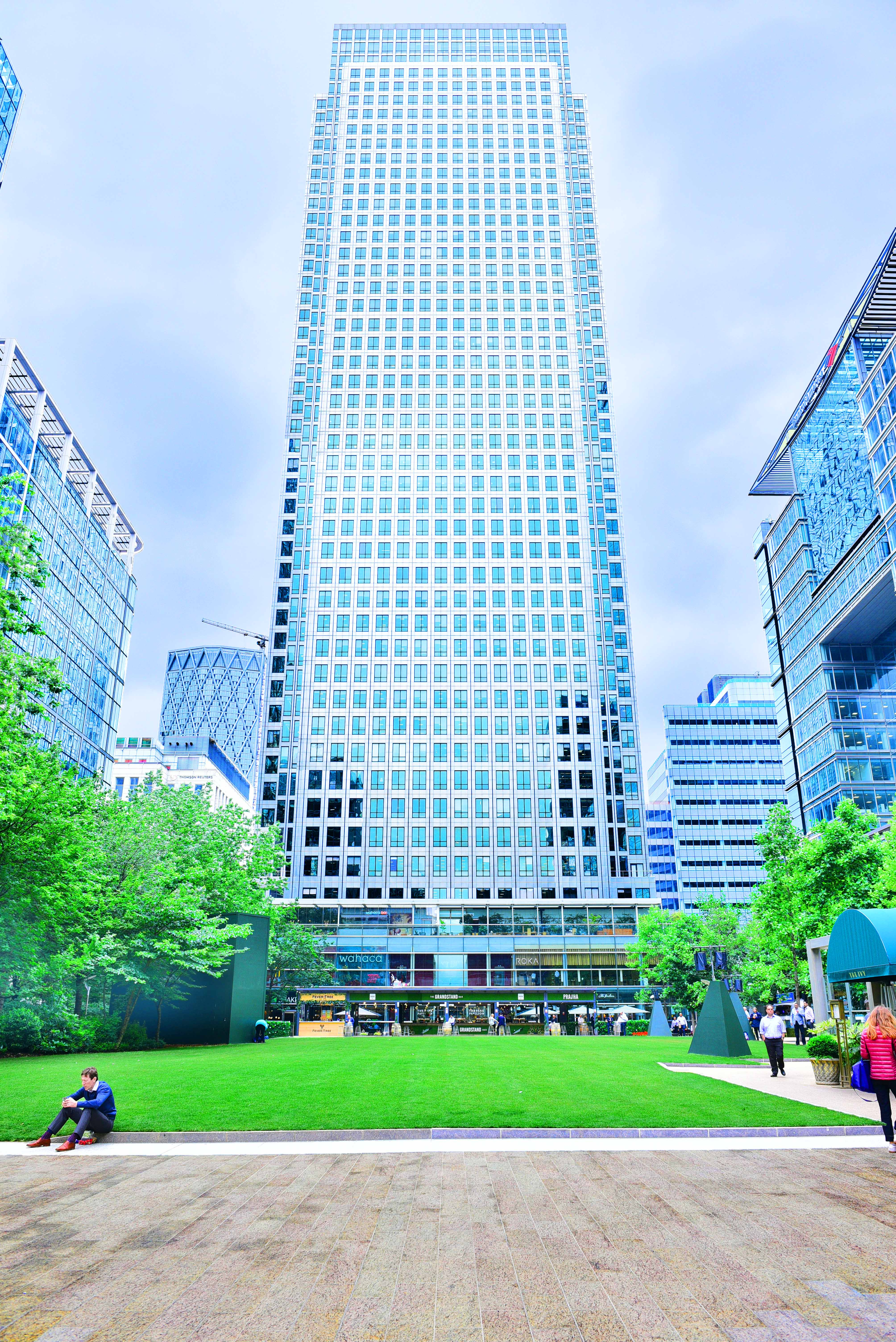
View from Canada Square

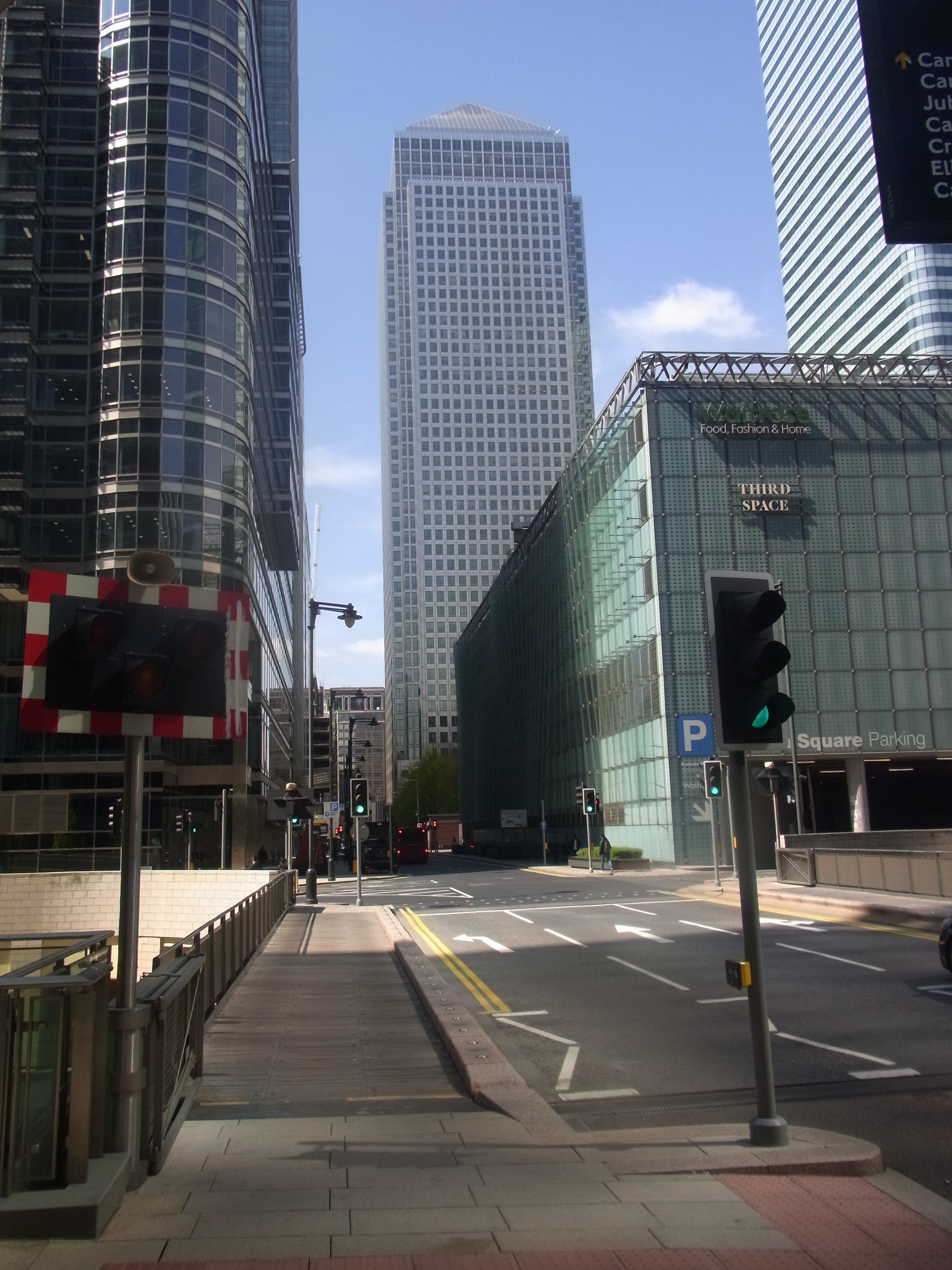
Street view

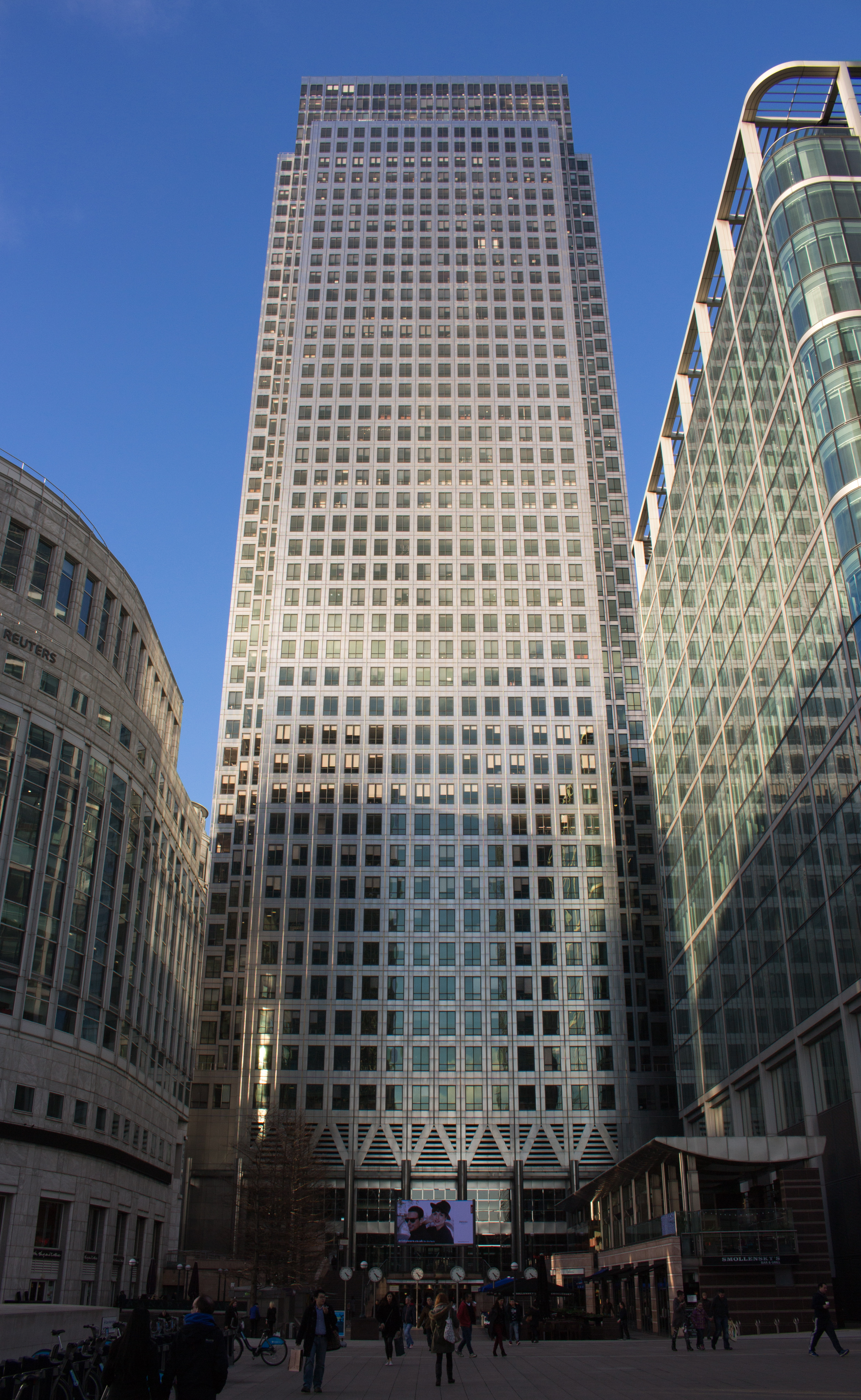
View from London Underground station

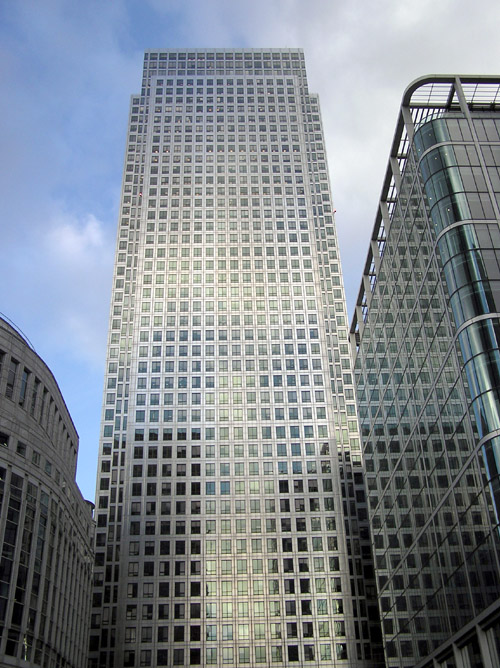
Side view

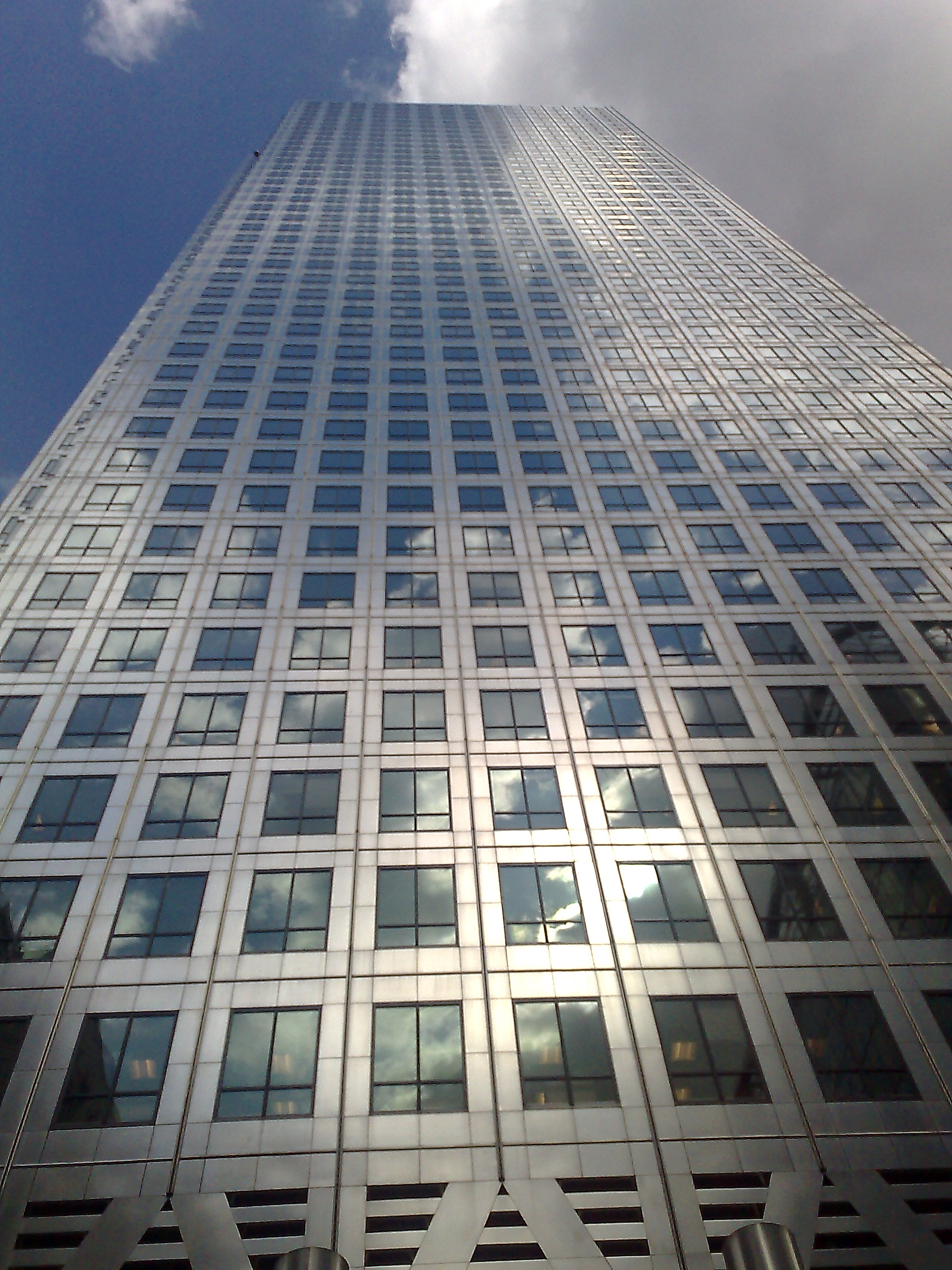
Building clad

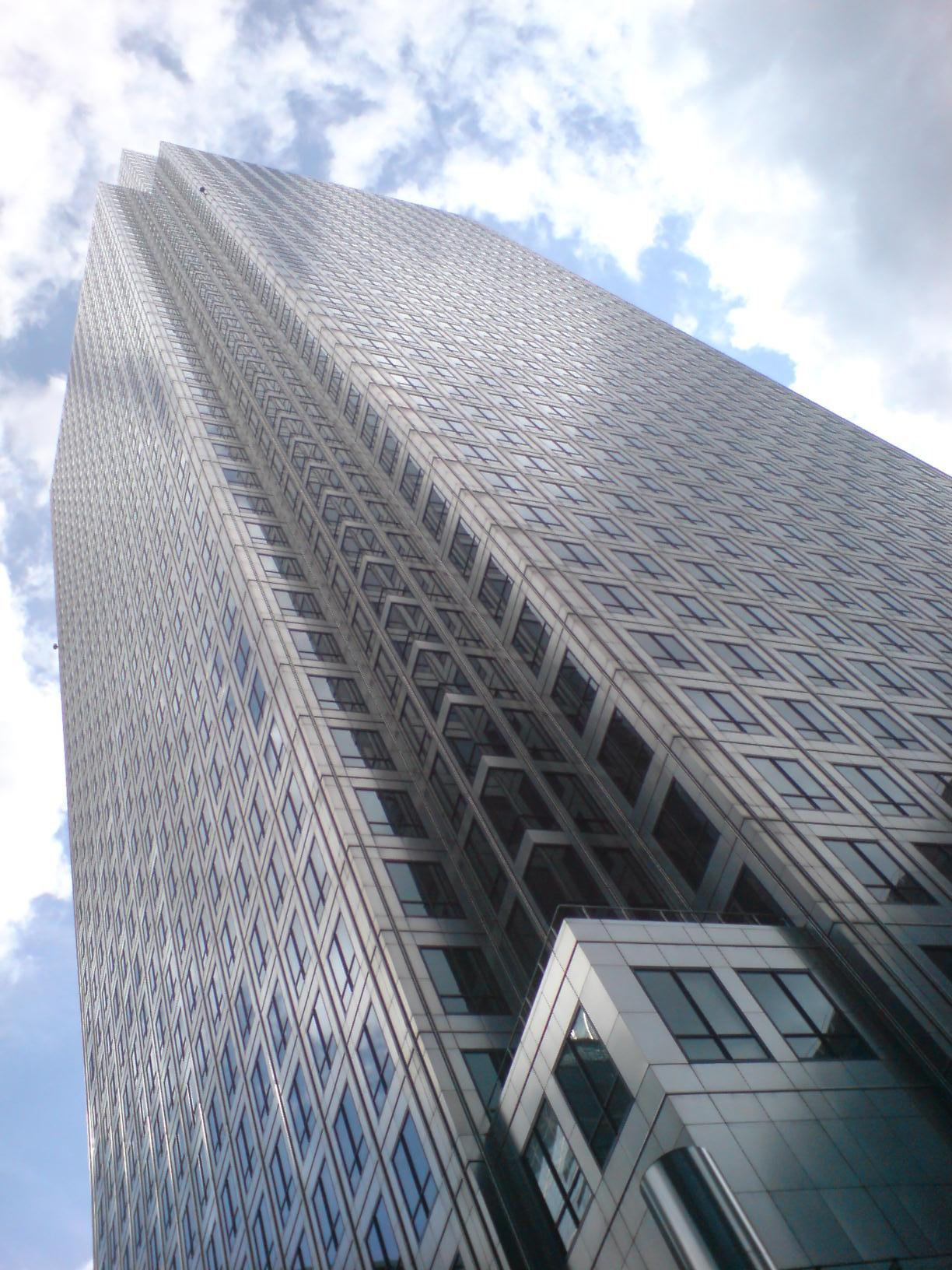
Side angle

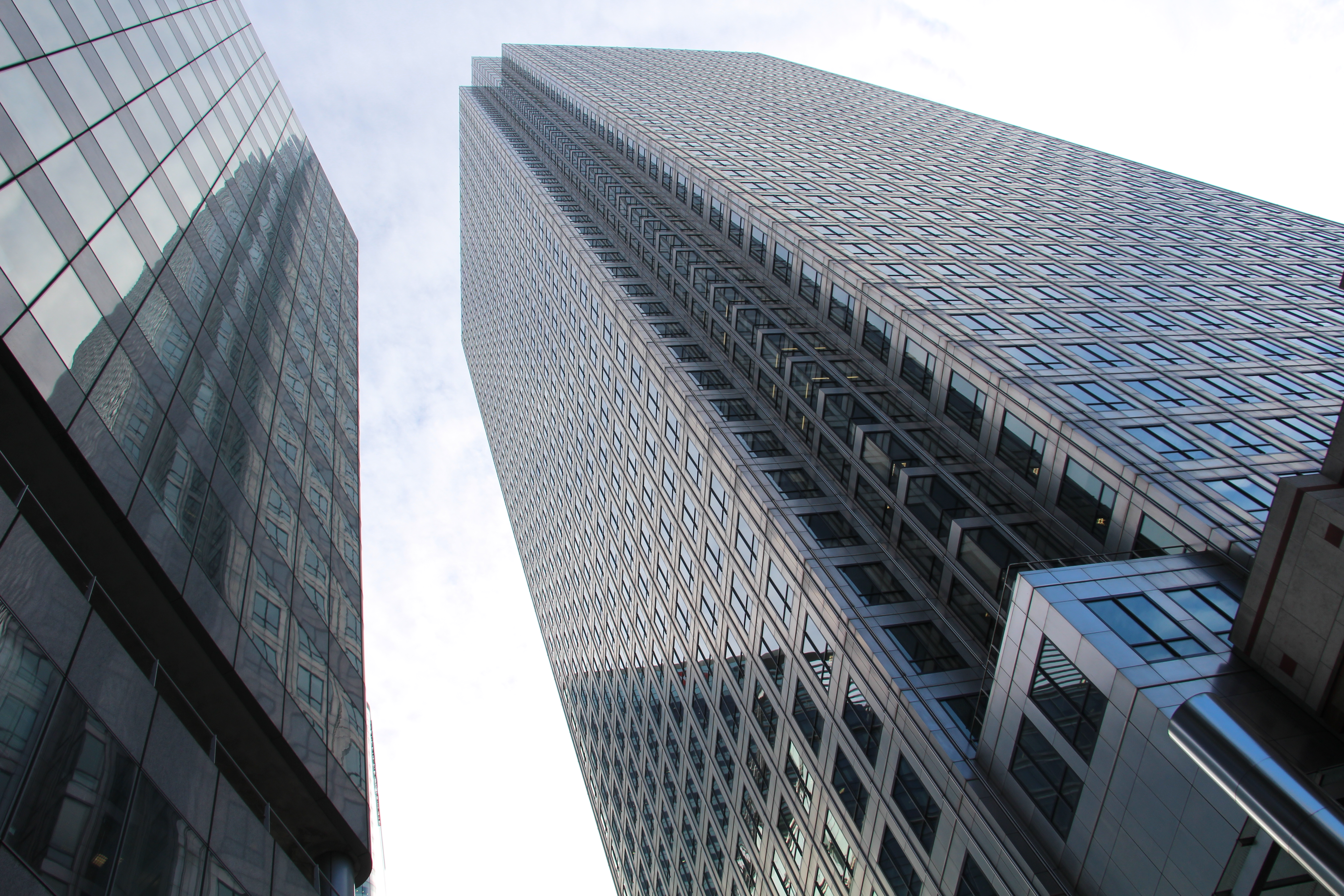
Side clad

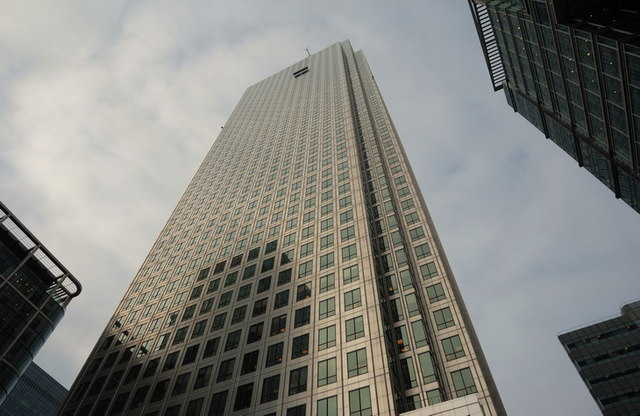
Clad with window washing machine

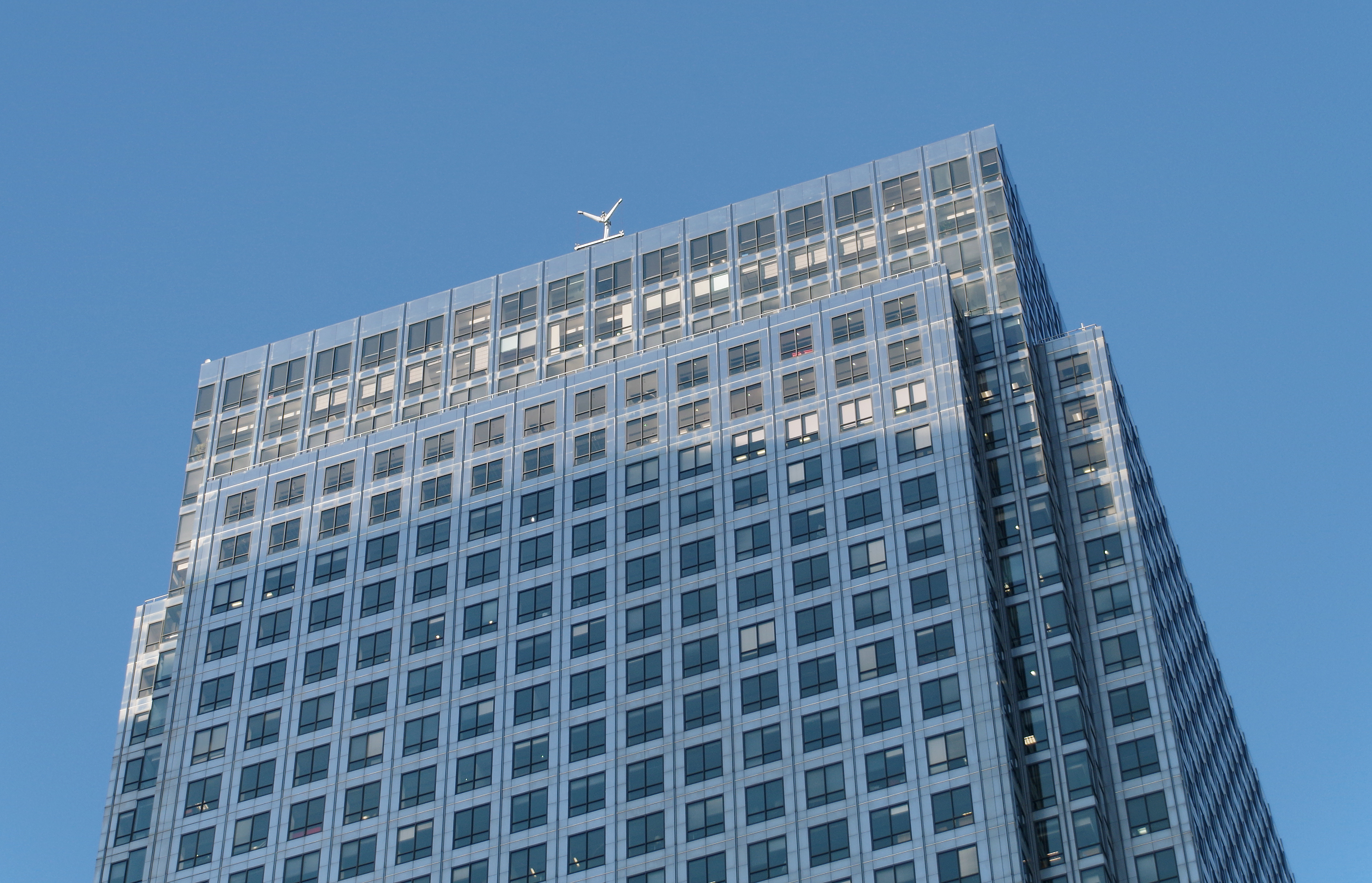
Upper floors with the window washing machine at the top

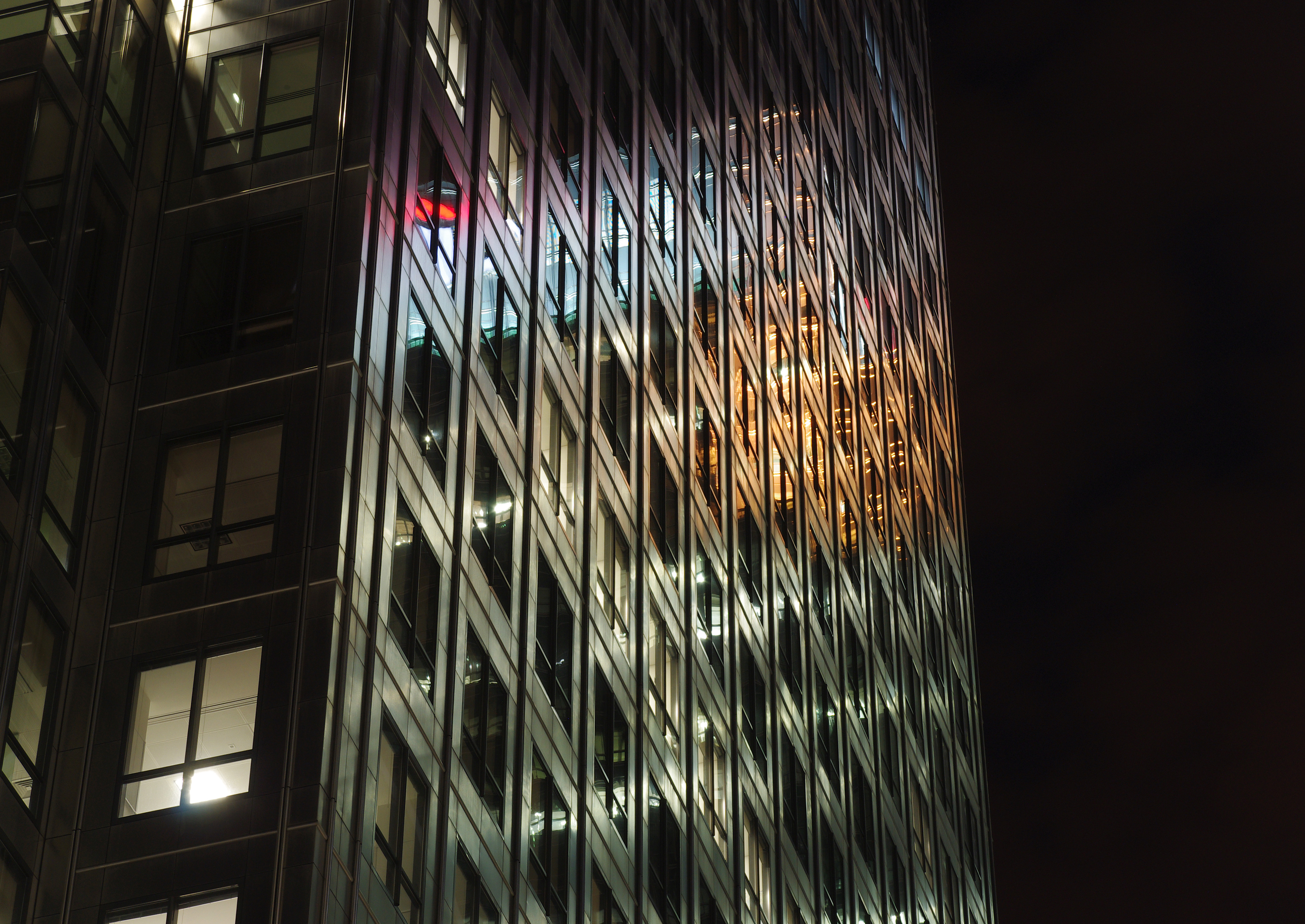
Cladding at night

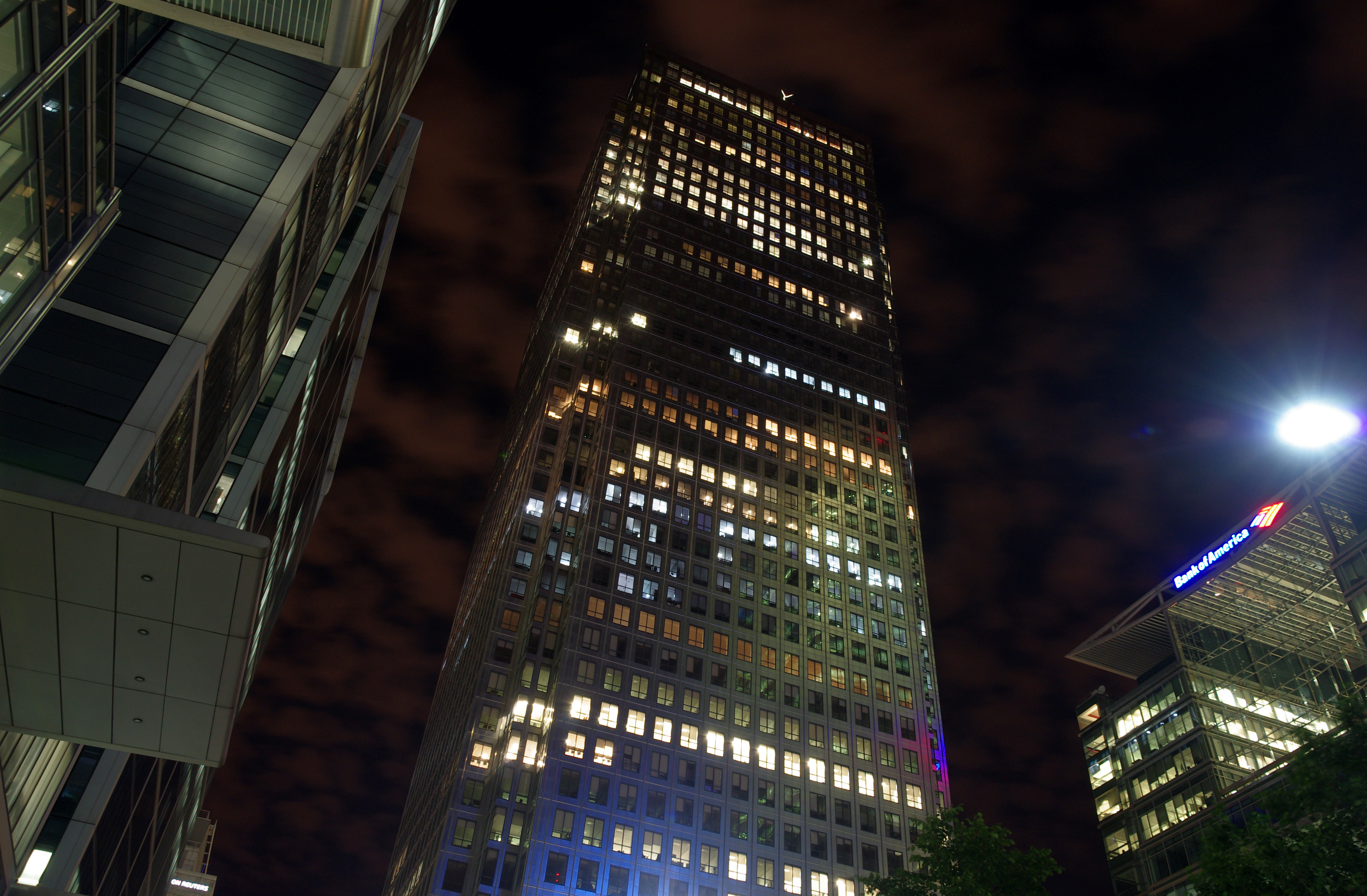
Night view

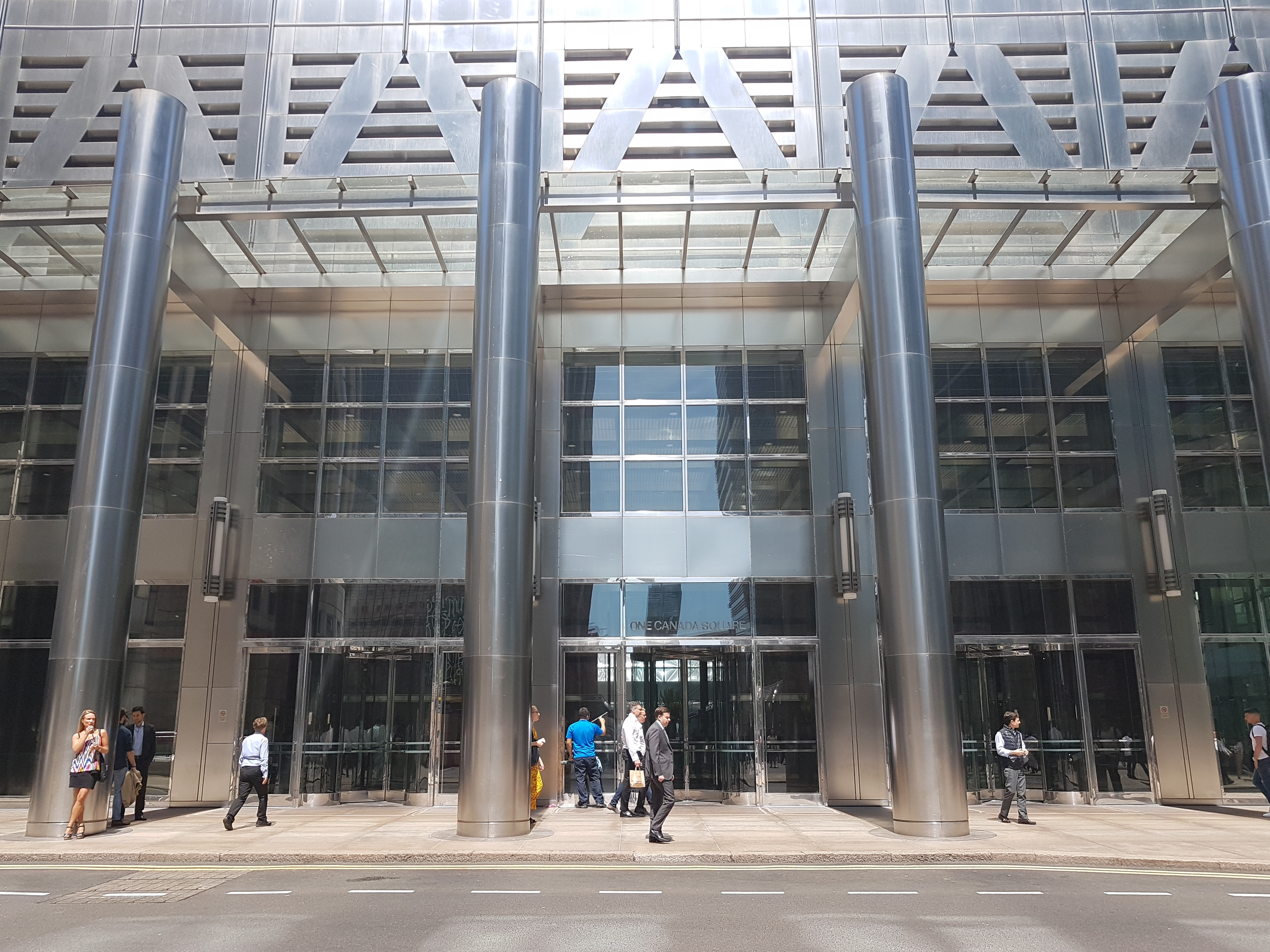
Street view showing canopy

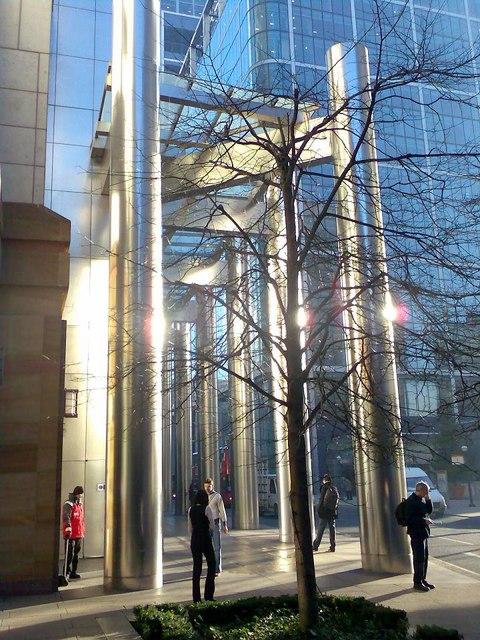
Outside view of canopy

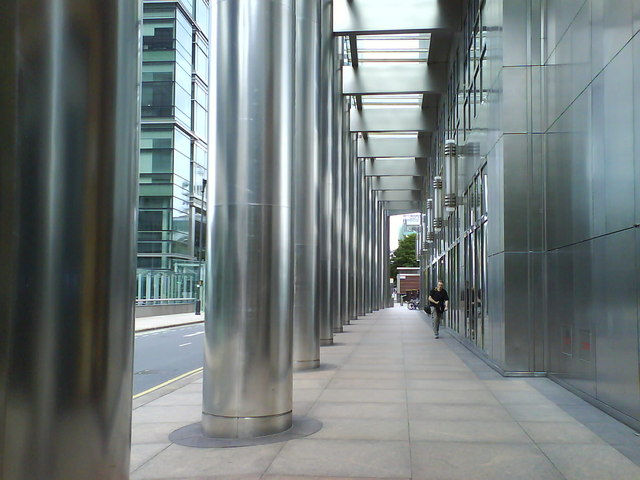
Street view on North Colonnade

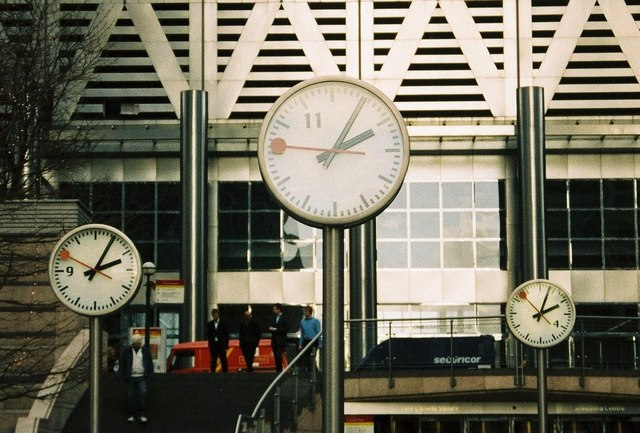
Clock artwork outside One Canada Square

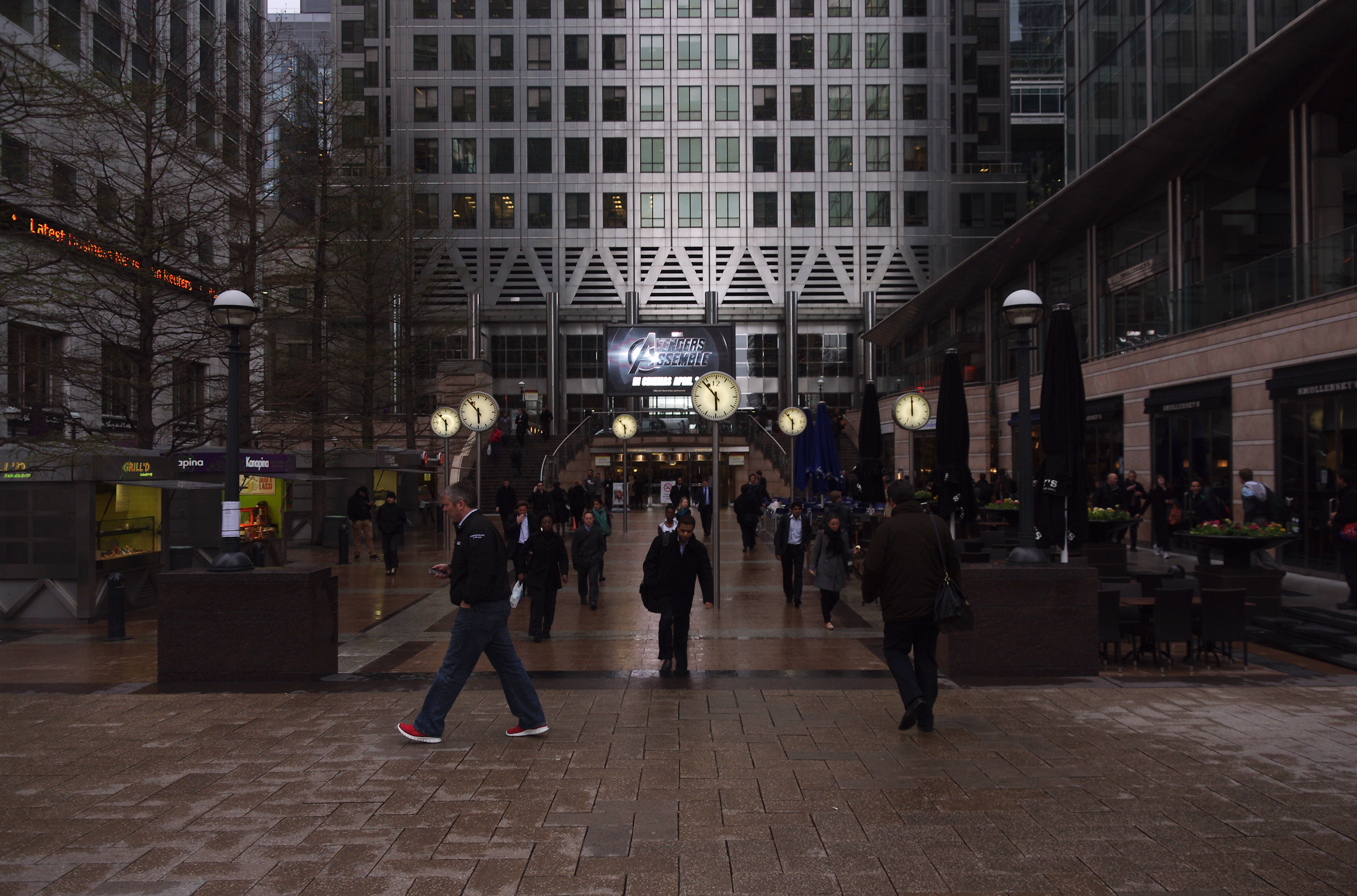
One Canada Square lower level entrances

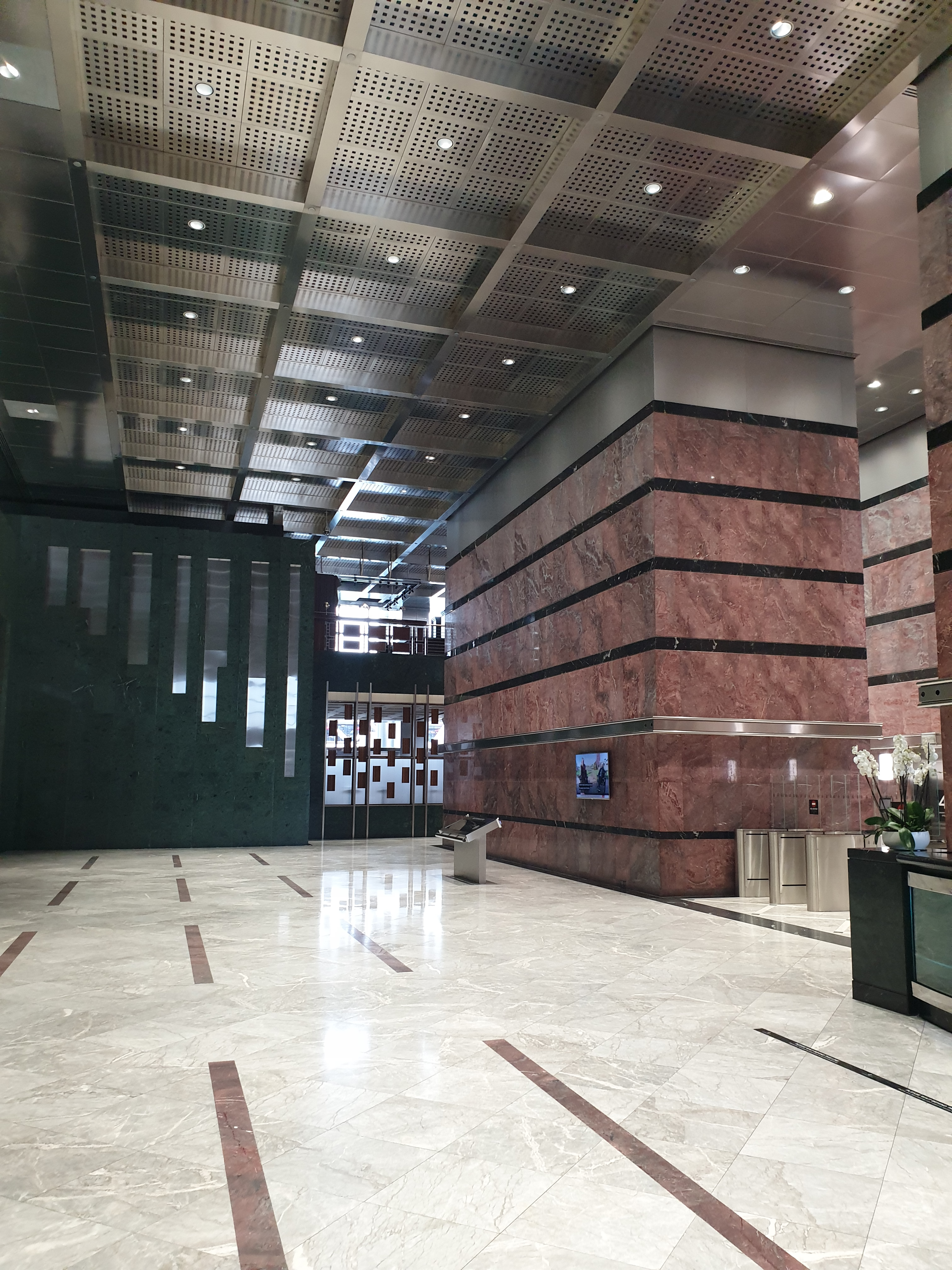
Lobby

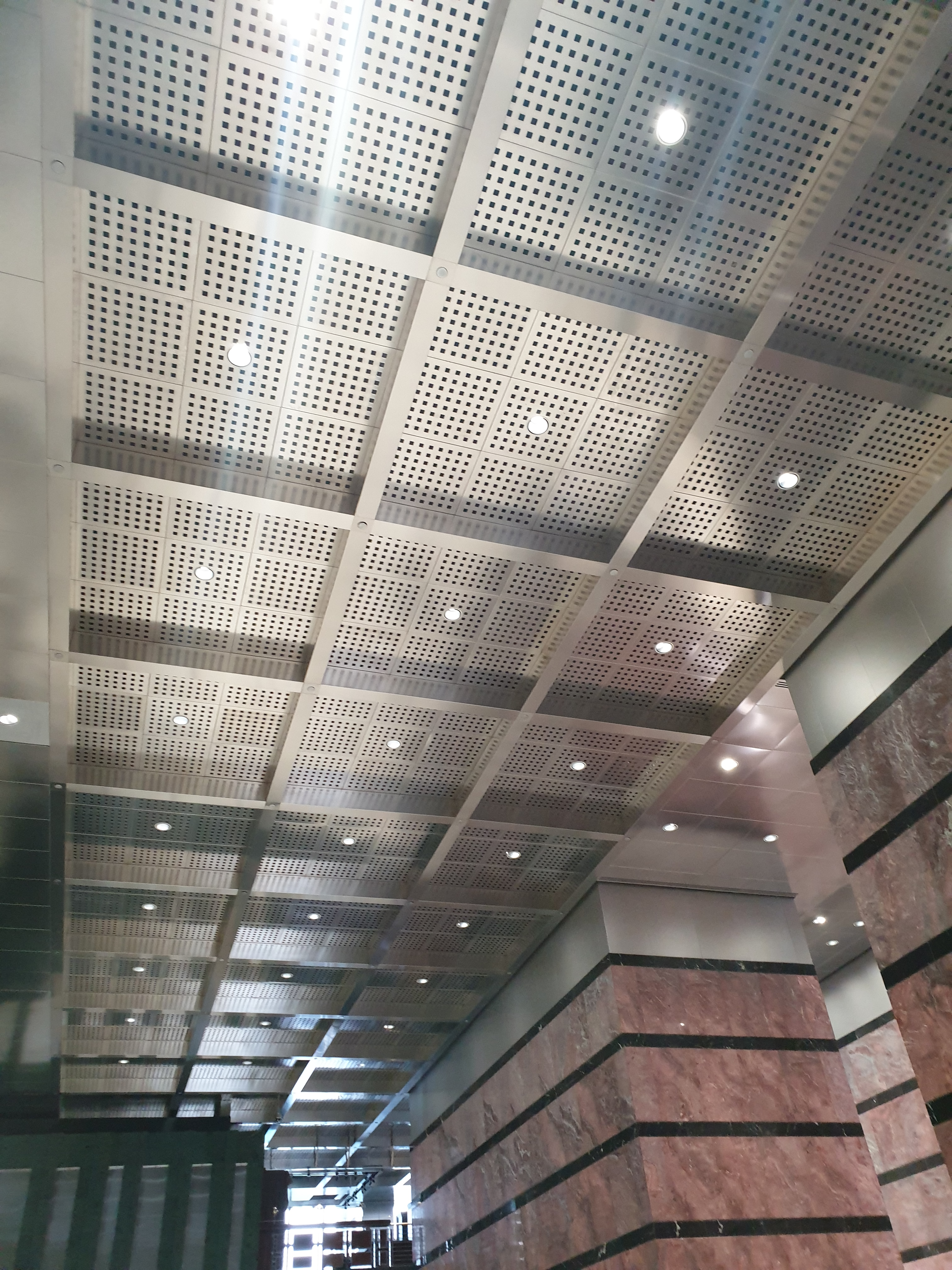
Lobby ceiling

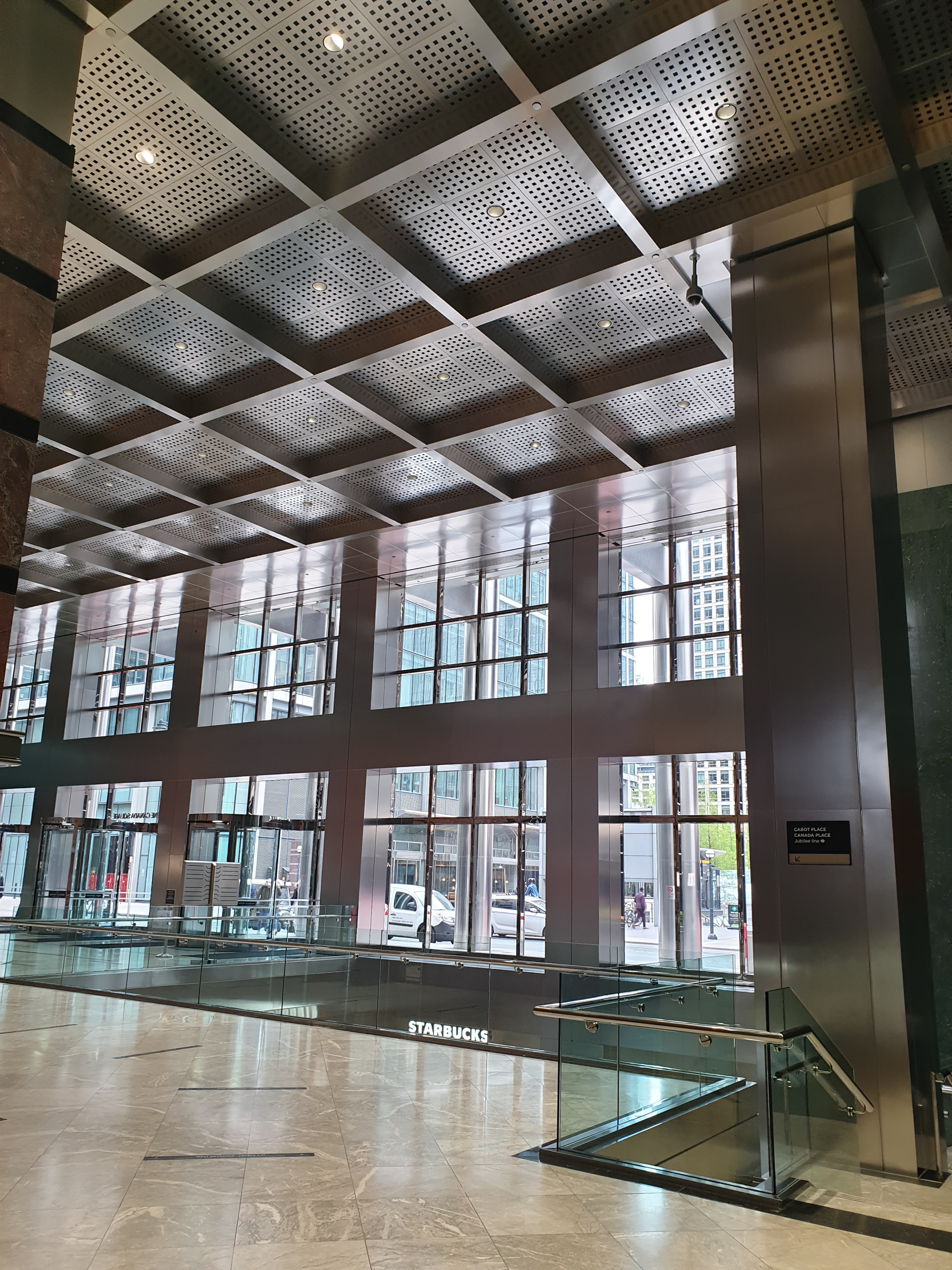
Lobby facing towards street

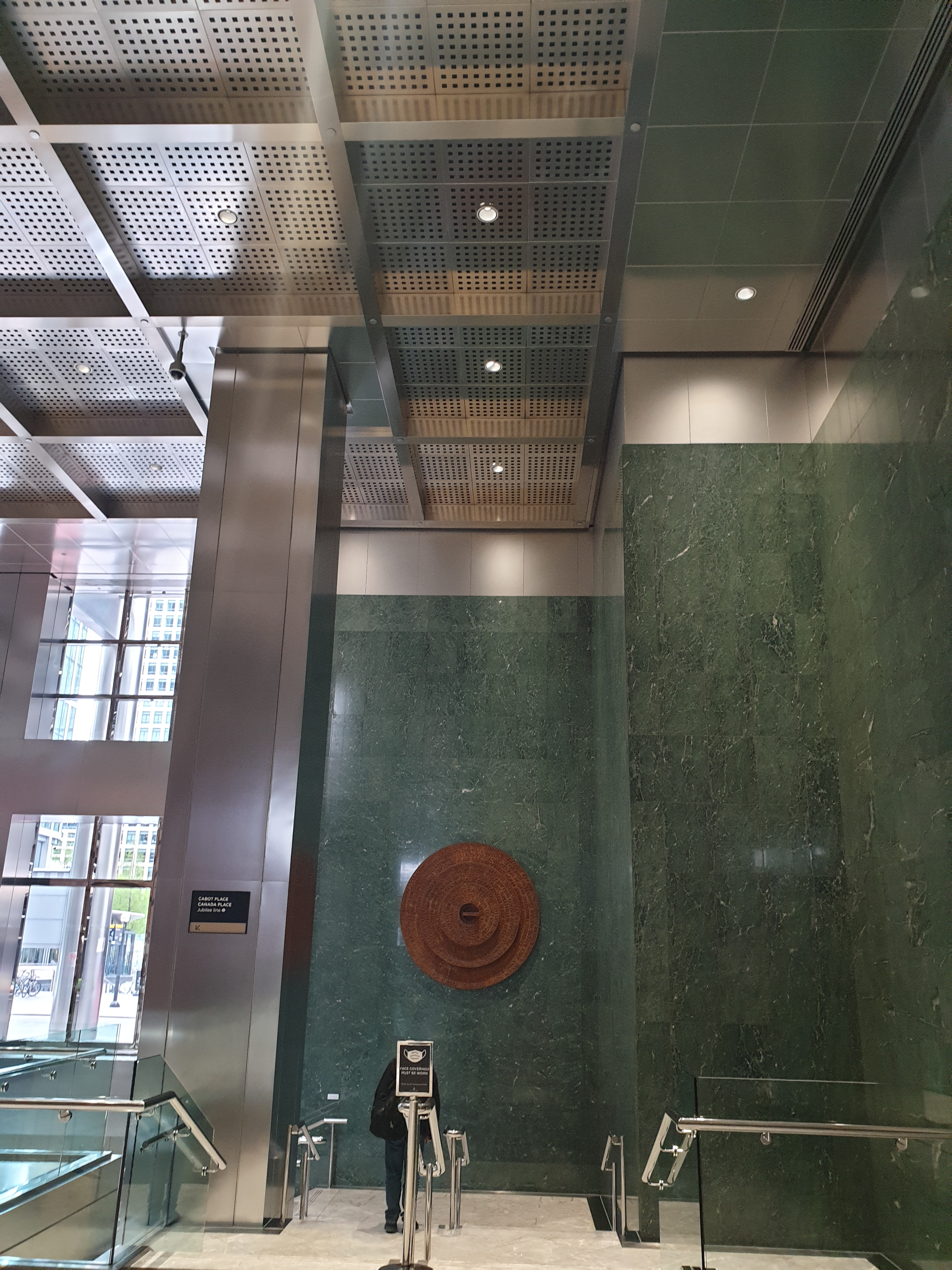
Lobby art

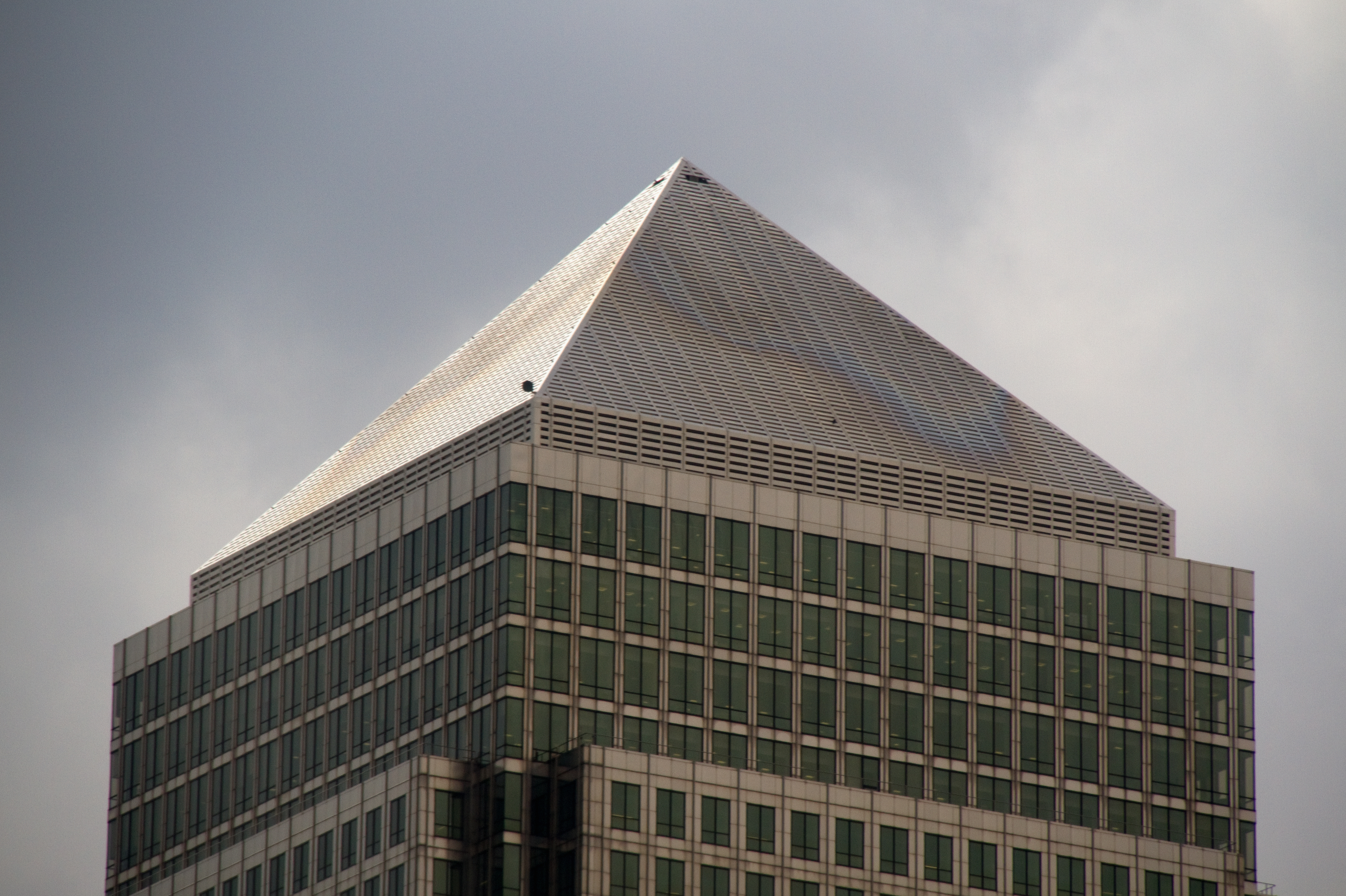
Pyramid roof

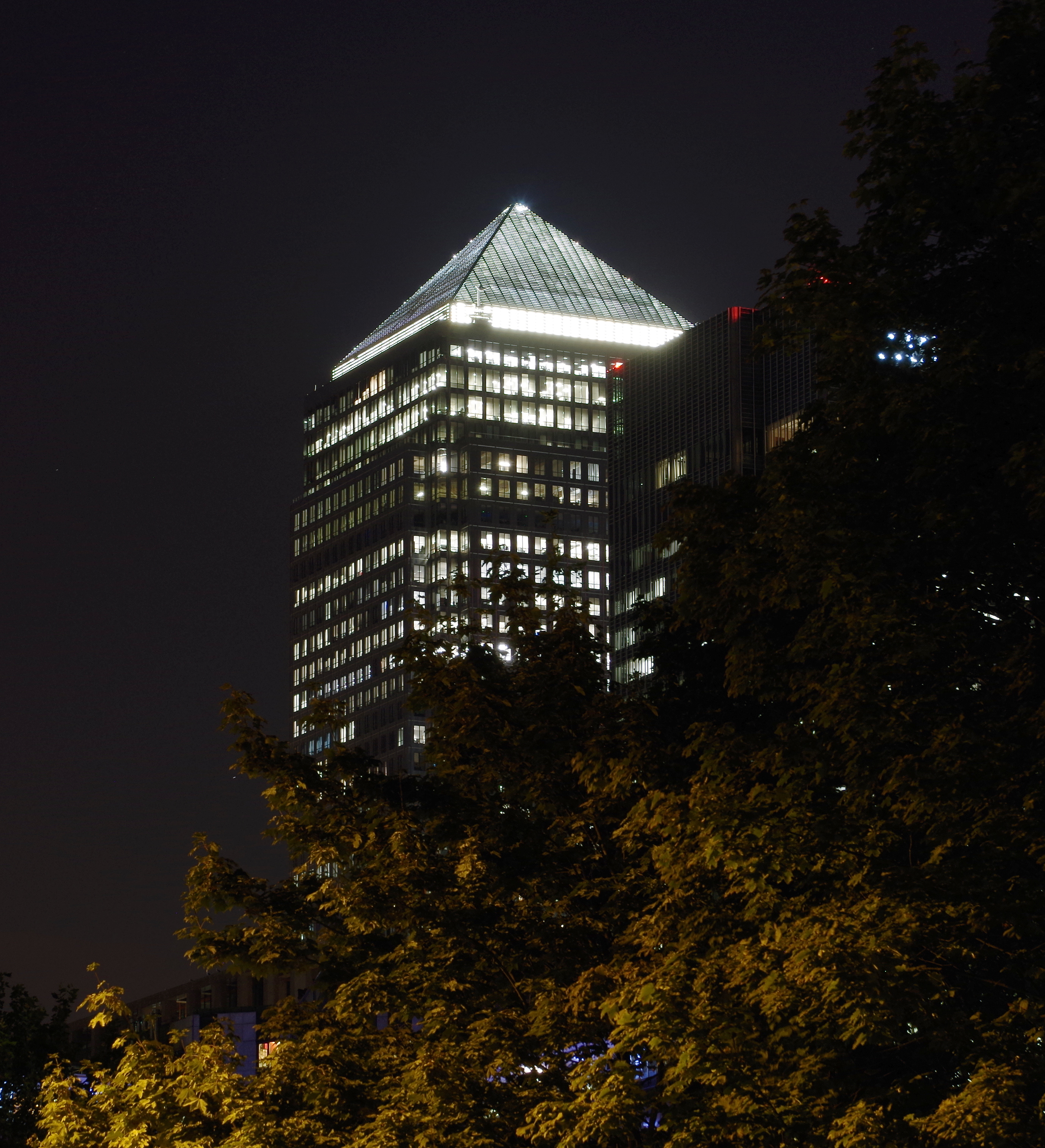
Night view with pyramid roof lit up

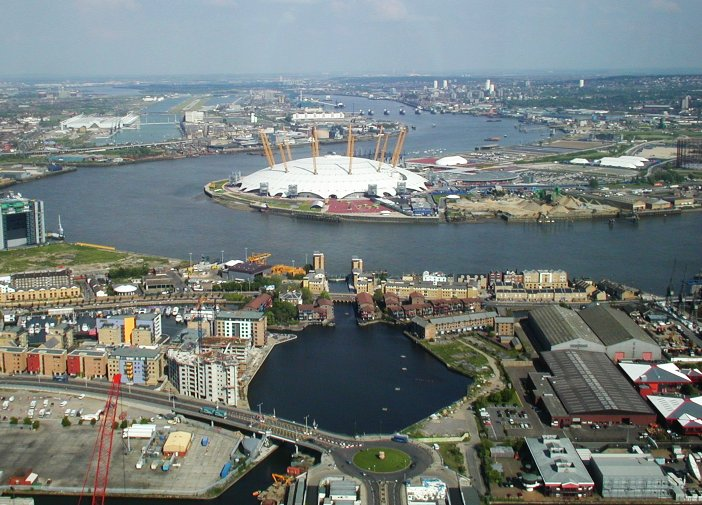
View from top floor (May 2000)

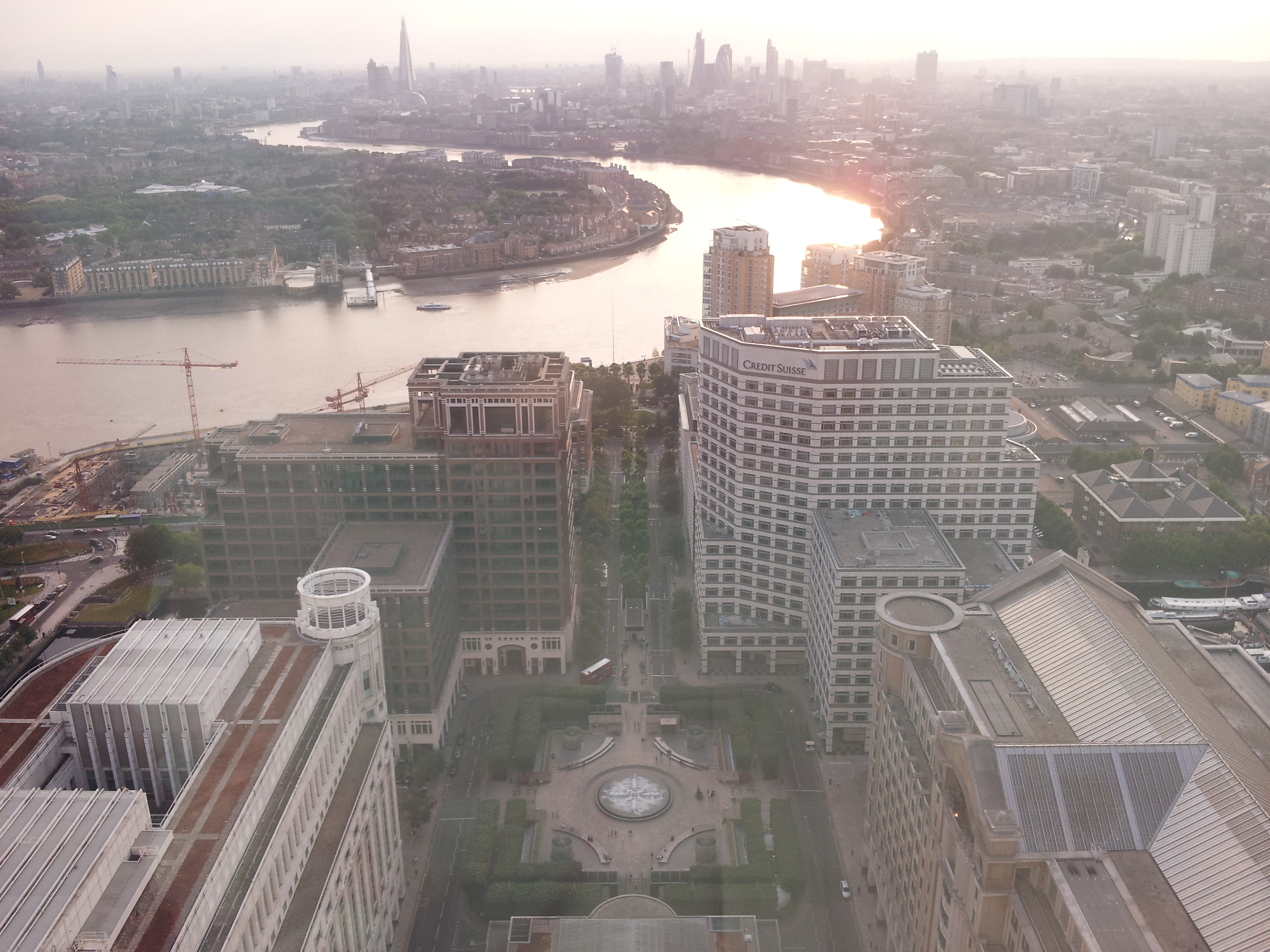
View from One Canada Square looking west towards central London

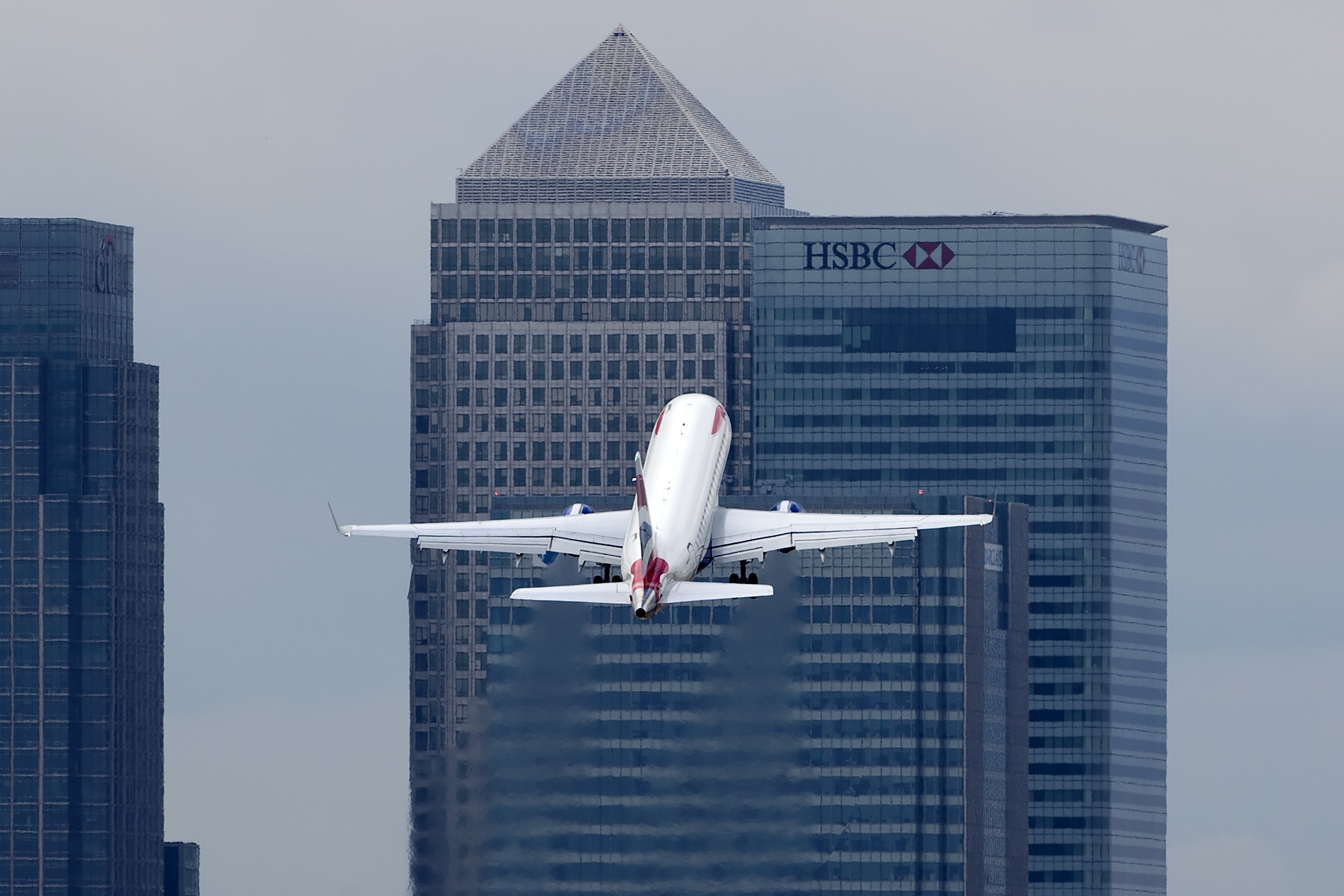
Airplane leaving London City Airport on the flight path near One Canada Square

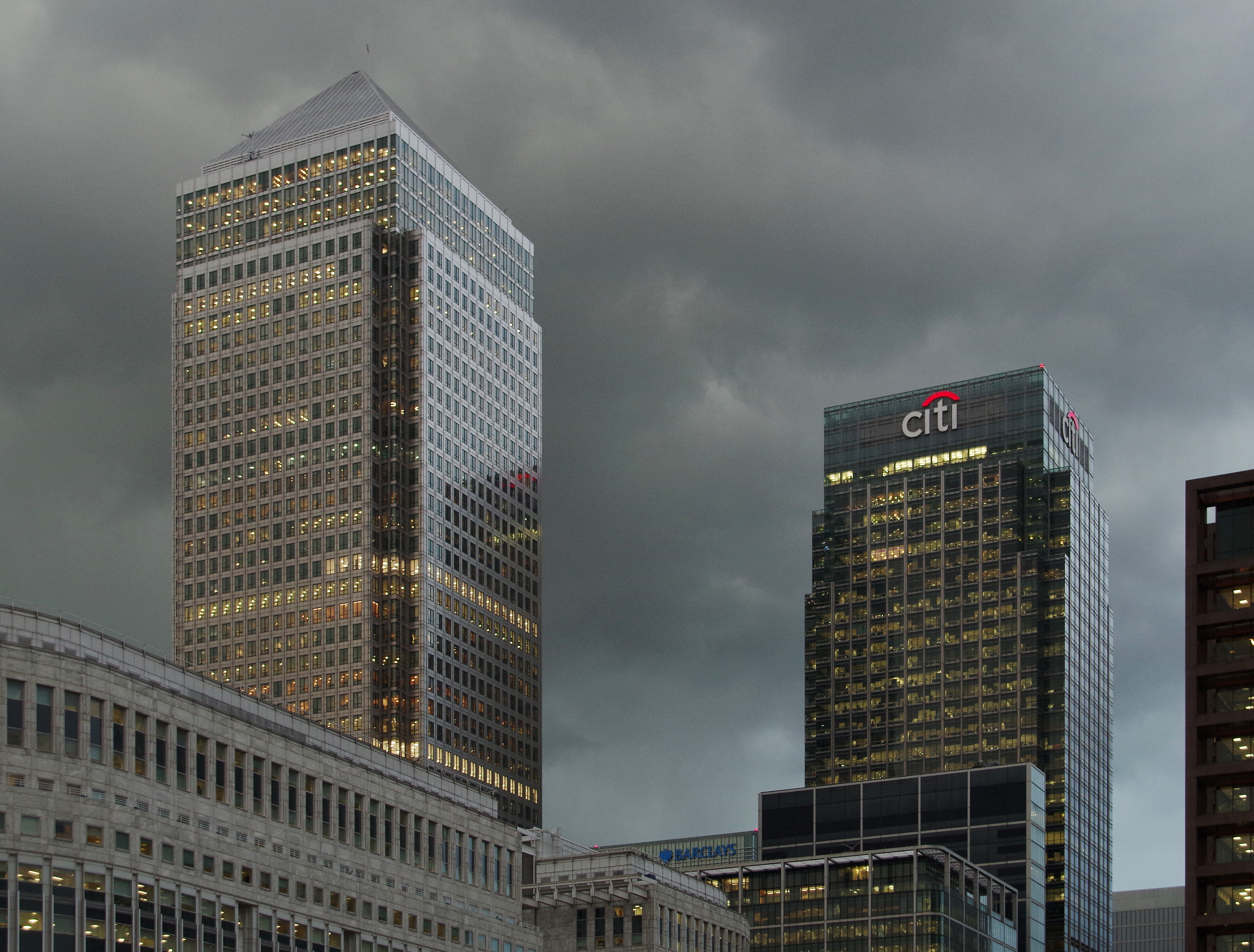
Stainless steel clad having a reflective shine on cloudy days

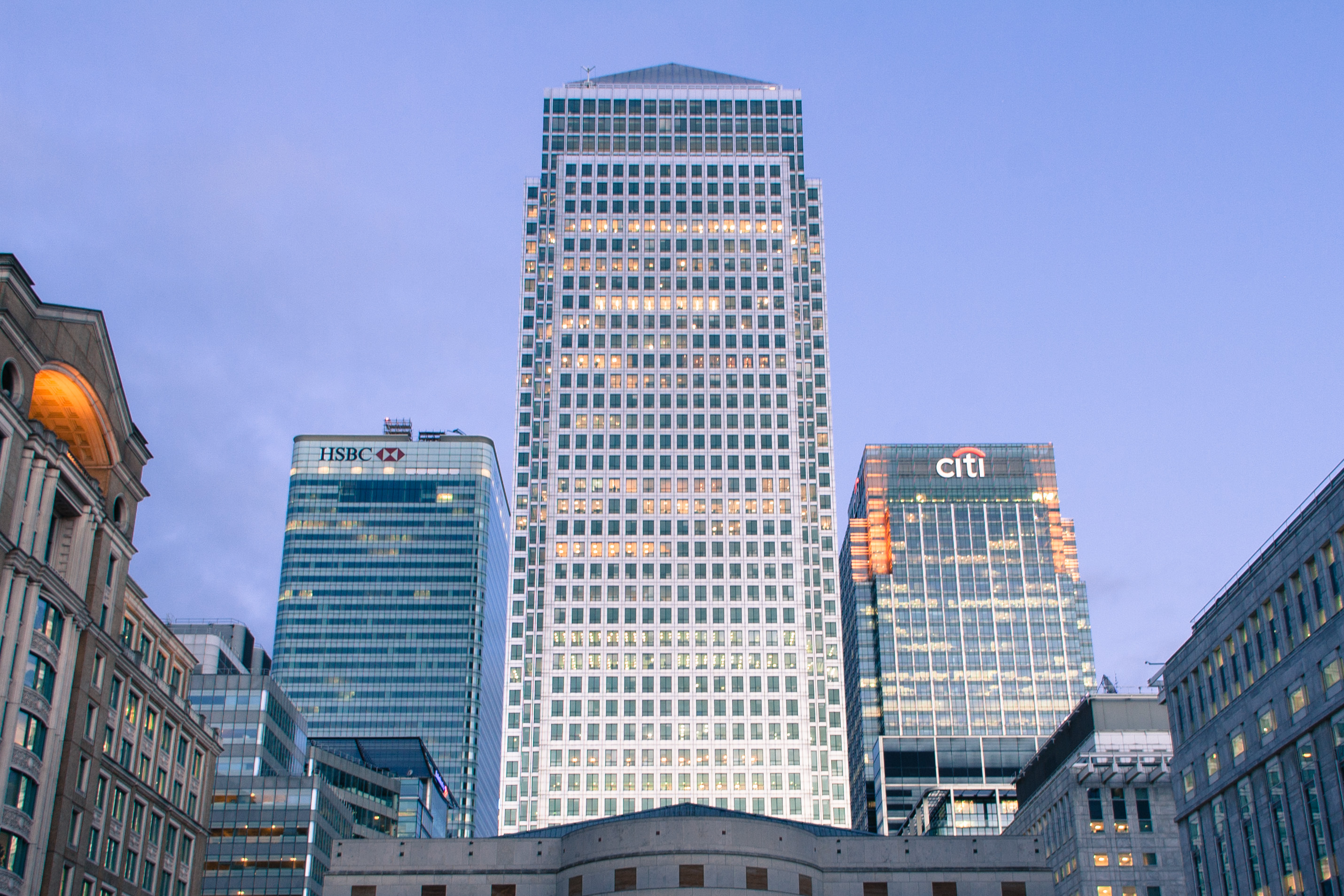
View with neighbouring towers

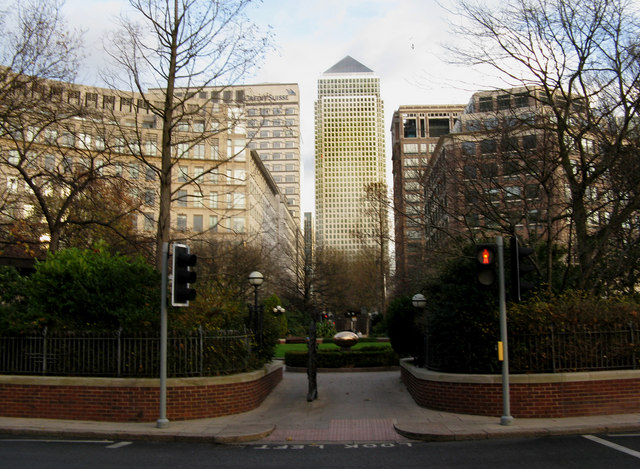
View from Westferry Circus

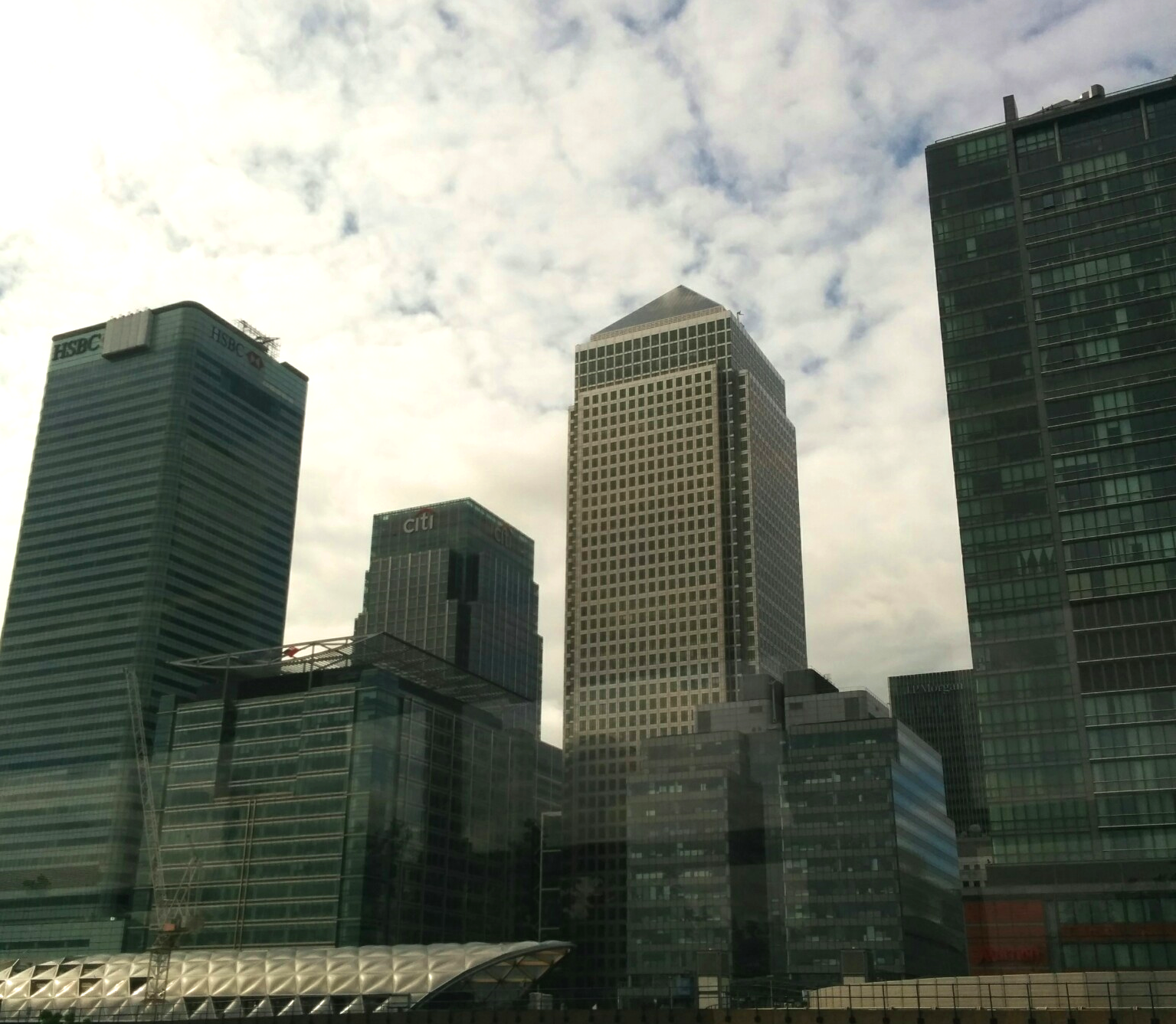
View from West India Quay

View from Limehouse and the River Thames

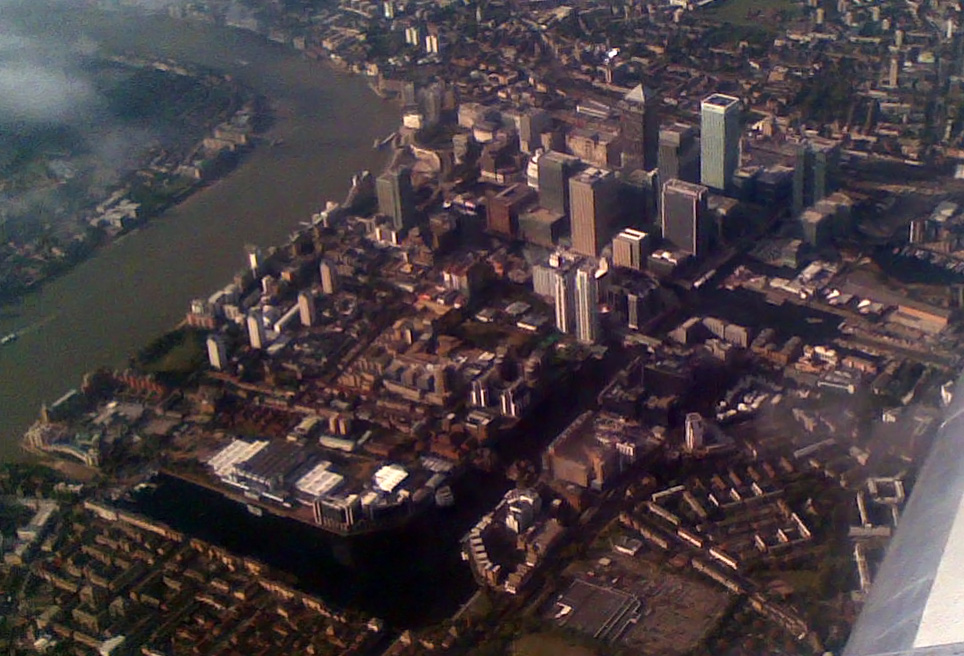
Aerial view

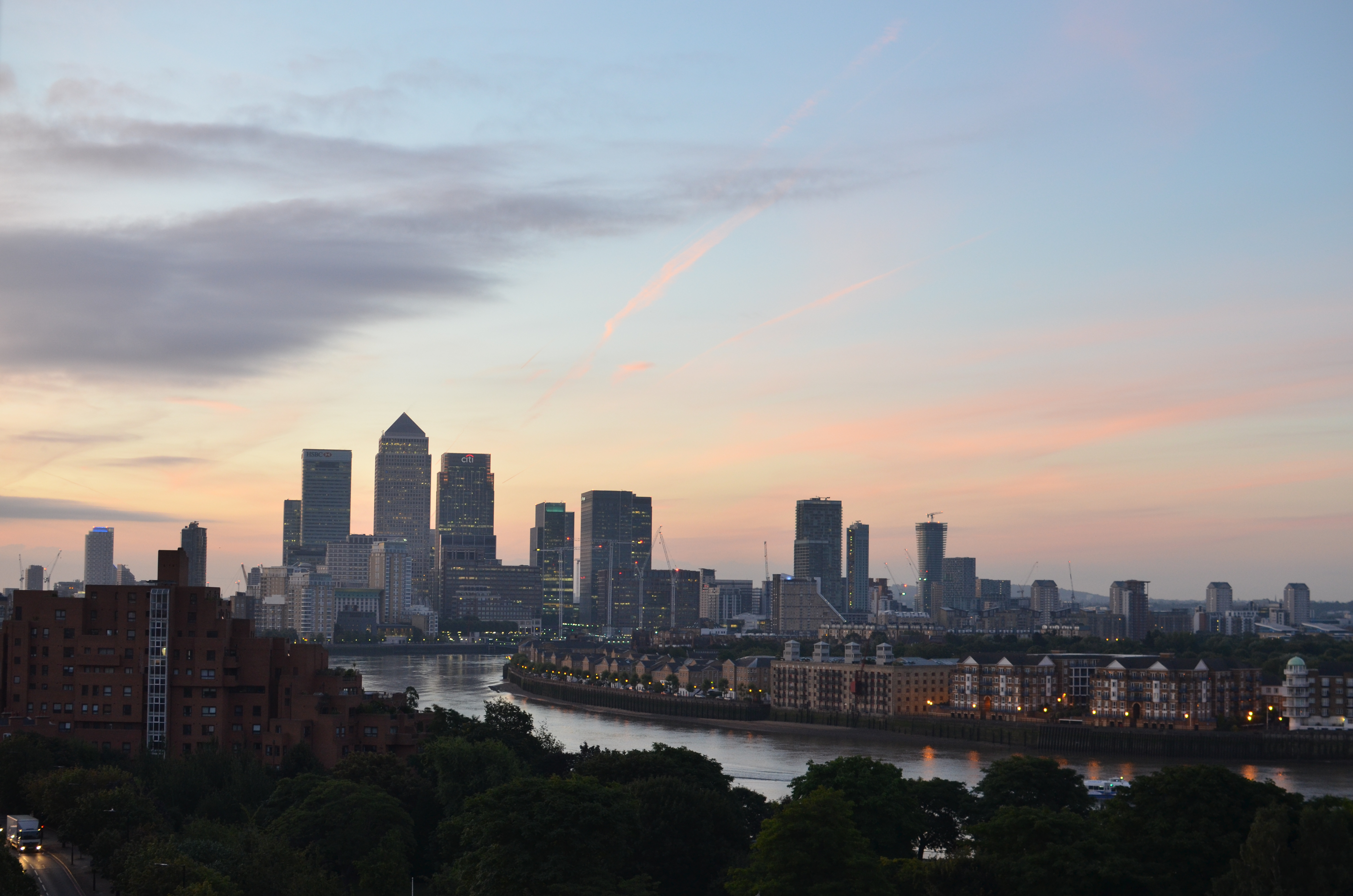
One Canada Square pyramid top standing out on the skyline

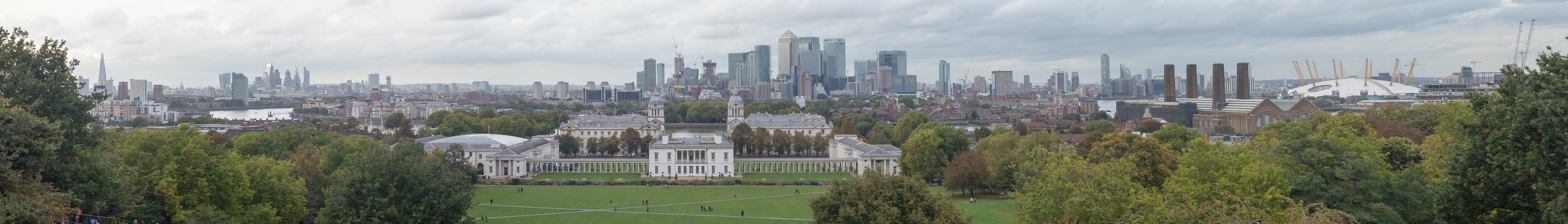
Skyline view from Greenwich

== See also ==
- Canary Wharf
- List of tallest buildings in the United Kingdom
- 225 Liberty Street, 200 Liberty Street, 250 Vesey Street similar looking buildings in New York

Records
Preceded by NatWest Tower	Tallest Building in the United Kingdom; 1991—2012; 235m	Succeeded by The Shard
Preceded by NatWest Tower	Tallest Building in London; 1991—2012; 235m	Succeeded by The Shard
Preceded by –	Tallest Building in Canary Wharf; 1991—present 235m	Succeeded by Riverside South
