= 5 Canada Square =

Office building in Canary Wharf, London, England

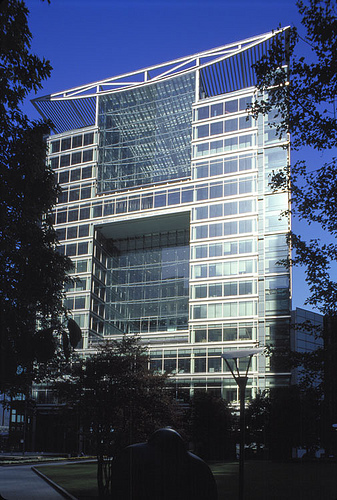
- Interactive map of the 5 Canada Square area

General information
- Status: Completed
- Type: Commercial offices
- Architectural style: Postmodern
- Location: Canary Wharf; London, E14; United Kingdom
- Coordinates: 51.505556°N 0.018611°W
- Construction started: 1999
- Completed: 2003

Height
- Roof: 87.70 m (287.7 ft)

Technical details
- Floor count: 16
- Floor area: 46,450 m^{2} (500,000 sq ft)

Design and construction
- Architect: Skidmore, Owings & Merrill

5 Canada Square is a 15-storey, 87.7 m (288 ft) office building in the Canary Wharf financial estate of London, England.

== Overview ==
5 Canada Square was completed in 2003. The steel-framed building has an aluminum curtain wall and it features a large atrium on its south side with 46,450 m^{2} (500,000 sq ft) of floorspace.

The principal tenant at 5 Canada Square is the European arm and HQ of Bank of America Securities. The building is used for the bank's global cash-management business for clients. Credit Suisse also occupies part of the building.

== History ==
In 2003, Royal Bank of Scotland (or RBS) bought 5 Canada Square along with 25 Canada Square, another Canary Wharf building, for a total of £1.1 billion from Canary Wharf, a major property firm that developed the facility. 5 Canada Square was originally leased by Credit Suisse First Boston but after a banking downturn and not needing the space, Credit Suisse let the space to Bank of America.

In July 2007, the building was sold by RBS to Evans Randall, a banking firm, for £452 million, making it the firm's largest UK investment to date. In 2011, Bank of America chose to renew its lease at 5 Canada Square instead of move to another London location. The building was subsequently sold to St Martins Property Group in January 2013.

From late 2016, Thomson Reuters is due to sublease 350,000 sq ft from Credit Suisse until 2020, consolidating all of its London operations under one roof for the first time.
