= 15 Canada Square =

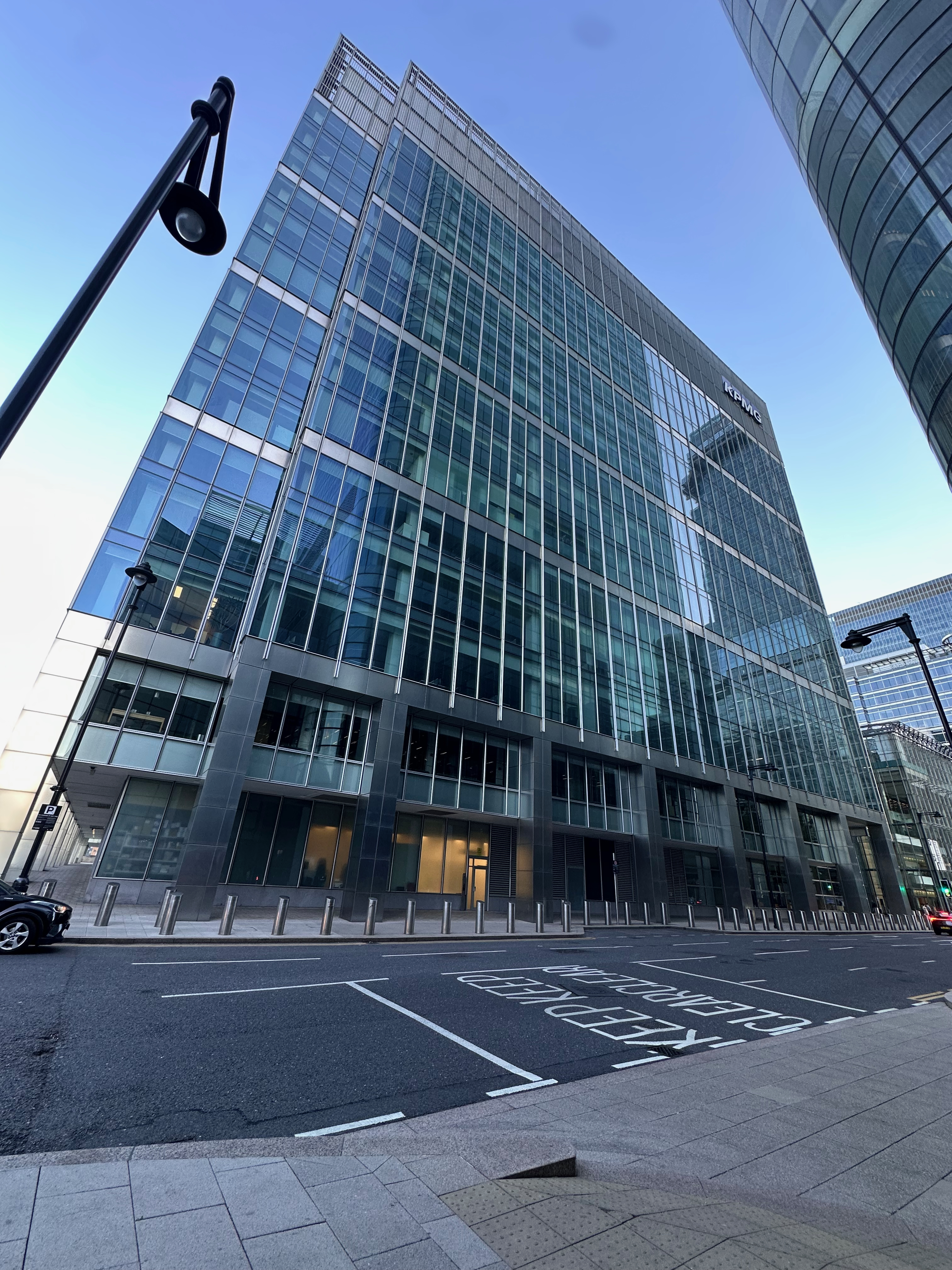
- Interactive map of the 15 Canada Square area

General information
- Status: Completed
- Type: Commercial offices
- Location: 15 Canada Square; London; E14 5GL; England
- Coordinates: 51.505306°N 0.016028°W
- Owner: Kingboard Investors

Height
- Height: 227 feet (69 m)

Technical details
- Floor count: 14
- Floor area: 434,261 sq ft (40,344.2 m^{2})

Design and construction
- Architect: Adamson Associates
- Developer: Canary Wharf Contractors
- Structural engineer: WSP Cantor Seinuk
- Main contractor: Canary Wharf Contractors

15 Canada Square is a 14-storey, 227 feet (69 m) tall office building in the Canary Wharf financial estate of London, England. It is owned by Kingboard Investors.

== Overview ==
The building's main tenant is KPMG. The building has 15 floors (including the roof) and 434,261 sq ft (40,344.2 m^{2}) of office space.

The underground car park has space for 200 bicycles and 40 cars.

== History ==
KPMG announced the purchase of the plot for the building in 2006, after signing a 999-year leasehold for the land, with construction beginning later that year. The exterior architects for the scheme were Kohn Pederson Fox and Adamsons Associates. The scheme cost £260 million in total. The building was fitted out by ISG and designed by SHCA.

The building was completed in 2010 and opened by Queen Elizabeth II the same year. The building was called the "greenest on the wharf" when it opened, being constructed using recycled materials and achieving a BREEAM Excellent rating.

In 2014, 40,000 bees were placed on the 15th floor roof of the building. The company installed a "Beecam" so staff could watch the bees.

KPMG appointed Jones Lang LaSalle to begin seeking a buyer for the building in 2017 as part of a sale and lease-back deal.

The building was initially due to be purchased by Malaysian fund board Tabung Haji, but their board later rescinded their offer in November. Hong Kong-based Kingboard Investors (a subsidiary of Kingboard Holdings) then purchased the building from KPMG for £400 million in December. KPMG signed a 25-year lease to stay in the building.

In 2011, 2018, and 2024, over 100 KPMG employees abseiled down the side of the building during a charity event.
