= List of tallest buildings and structures in the United Kingdom by usage =

This is a list of the tallest buildings and structures in the United Kingdom by usage.

== Tallest buildings ==
=== Tallest castles ===
Rank	Building	Location	Image	Height	Year	Notes
1	Warwick Castle	Warwick, Warwickshire		45 m (148 ft)	1360	Guy's tower rises 39 m (128 ft), Caesar's Tower rises 45 m (148 ft) but from a lower level.
2	Rochester Castle	Rochester, Kent		38 m (125 ft)	1127	34.5 m (113 ft) to parapet, 38 m (125 ft) to turrets.
3	Caernarfon Castle	Caernarfon, Gwynedd		35 m (115 ft)	1330	
4	Tattershall Castle	Tattershall, Lincolnshire		33.5 m (110 ft)	1446	
5	White Tower, Tower of London	Tower Hamlets, London		32 m (105 ft)*	1078	Height to parapet 27.4 m (90 ft), estimated height to top of stone turrets 32 m (105 ft)
6=	Conwy Castle	Conwy, Gwynedd		30 m (98 ft)	1289	
6=	Richmond Castle	Richmond, North Yorkshire		30 m (98 ft)	1200	
6=	Portchester Castle	Portchester, Hampshire		30 m (98 ft)	1200	
9	Conisbrough Castle	Conisbrough, South Yorkshire		29.5 m (97 ft)	1180	
10	Dover Castle	Dover, Kent		29 m (95 ft)	1180	

*Estimated height

=== Tallest residential buildings ===
- The tallest partly residential building - containing the highest apartments - is the 309.6 m (1,016 ft) Shard, London.

Rank	Building	Location	Image	Height	Year	Notes
1	Landmark Pinnacle	Tower Hamlets, London		233 m (764 ft)	2020	
2	Newfoundland Place	Tower Hamlets, London	NewfoundlandCanaryWharf	220 m (720 ft)	2020	
3	Hampton Tower	Tower Hamlets, London	SouthQuayPlazaCanaryWharf	215 m (705 ft)	2021	
4	One Park Drive	Tower Hamlets, London	One park drive June 2021	205 m (673 ft)	2021	
5	Deansgate Square South Tower	Castlefield, Manchester	Deansgate Square - South Tower	201 m (659 ft)	2020	
6	One Nine Elms City Tower	Wandsworth, London		199 m (653 ft)	2022	
7	Wardian East Tower	Tower Hamlets, London	WardianEastCanaryWharf	187 m (614 ft)	2020	
8	One West Point Block A (Icon Tower)	Ealing, London		184 m (604 ft)	2022	
9	Amory Tower (The Madison)	Tower Hamlets, London	TheMadisonCanaryWharf	182 m (597 ft)	2020	
10	The Tower, One St George Wharf	Lambeth, London	St Georges Wharf Tower 2013-09-26	181 m (594 ft)	2013	

=== Tallest commercial buildings ===
The tallest partly commercial building - containing the highest offices - is the 309.6 m (1,016 ft) Shard, London.

Rank	Building	Location	Image	Height	Year	Notes
1	22 Bishopsgate	City of London, London		278 m (912 ft)	2020	
2	One Canada Square	Tower Hamlets, London		235 m (771 ft)	1991	
3	Heron Tower	City of London, London		230 m (750 ft)	2010	
4	122 Leadenhall Street	City of London, London		225 m (738 ft)	2014	
5	8 Bishopsgate	City of London, London		204 m (669 ft)	2022	
6=	HSBC Tower	Tower Hamlets, London		200 m (660 ft)	2002	
6=	Citigroup Centre	Tower Hamlets, London		200 m (660 ft)	2001	
8	The Scalpel	City of London, London		190 m (620 ft)	2018	
9	Tower 42	City of London, London		183 m (600 ft)	1980	
10	The Gherkin	City of London, London		180 m (590 ft)	2003	

=== Tallest government buildings ===
Rank	Building	Location	Image	Height	Year	Notes
1	Victoria Tower	City of Westminster, London		102 m (335 ft)	1858	Architectural height 102 m (335 ft), roof height 98.5 m (323 ft).
3	Manchester Town Hall	Manchester, Greater Manchester		87.2 m (286 ft)	1877	
4	Civil Justice Centre	Manchester, Greater Manchester		80 m (260 ft)	2007	
5	Royal Courts of Justice	Westminster, London		74.6 m (245 ft)	1882	
6=	Glasgow City Chambers	Glasgow, Scotland		73 m (240 ft)	1890	
6=	Government Buildings	Cardiff, Wales		73 m (240 ft)		
8=	Leeds Town Hall	Leeds, West Yorkshire		69 m (226 ft)	1858	
8=	High Commission of New Zealand	City of Westminster, London		69 m (226 ft)	1963	
10	Central Criminal Court	London		66.6 m (219 ft)	1907	

=== Tallest hospitals ===
Rank	Building	Location	Image	Height	Year	Notes
1	Guy's Tower	Southwark, London		143 m (469 ft)	1973	
2	Royal London Hospital Tower 2	Tower Hamlets, London		101 m (331 ft)	2010	
3	Royal London Hospital Tower 1	Tower Hamlets, London		97 m (318 ft)	2010	
4	University College Hospital	Camden, London		78 m (256 ft)	2005	
5=	Royal Hallamshire Hospital	Sheffield, South Yorkshire		76 m (249 ft)	1979	
5=	Belfast City Hospital	Belfast, Northern Ireland		76 m (249 ft)	1986	

=== Tallest hotels ===
- The tallest partly hotel building is the 309.6 m (1,016 ft) Shard, London.
- The Beetham Tower, Manchester is 169 m (554 ft) tall of which half, up to and including the 23rd floor, is a hotel.
- 10 Holloway Circus, Birmingham is 130 m (430 ft) tall; the lower 19 floors are occupied by a hotel.

Rank	Building	Location	Image	Height	Year	Notes
1	40 Marsh Wall	Canary Wharf, London		127 m (417 ft)	2017	
2	London Hilton on Park Lane	City of Westminster, London		101 m (331 ft)	1963	
3	Hilton London Metropole	City of Westminster, London		91 m (299 ft)	1972	
4	Holiday Inn Kensington Forum	Kensington, London		84 m (276 ft)	1963	
5=	Premier Inn Leicester City Centre	Leicester, Leicestershire		82 m (269 ft)	1965	
5=	St. Pancras Renaissance London Hotel	St Pancras, London		82 m (269 ft)	1873	

=== Tallest museums and galleries ===
Rank	Building	Location	Image	Height	Year	Notes
1	Tate Modern	Southwark, London		99 m (325 ft)	1963	
2	Natural History Museum	Royal Borough of Kensington and Chelsea, London		58 m (190 ft)	1880	
3=	Eden Project	St Blazey, Cornwall		55 m (180 ft)	2001	
3=	Imperial War Museum North	Trafford, Greater Manchester		55 m (180 ft)	2002	
5	Birmingham Museum and Art Gallery	Birmingham, West Midlands		46 m (151 ft)	1885	
6	Baltic Centre for Contemporary Art	Gateshead, Tyne and Wear		42 m (138 ft)	1950	

=== Tallest places of worship ===
Rank	Building	Location	Image	Height	Year	Notes
1	Salisbury Cathedral	Salisbury, Wiltshire		123 m (404 ft)	1320	
2	St Paul's Cathedral	City of London, London		111 m (364 ft)	1711	
3	Liverpool Cathedral	Liverpool, Merseyside		101 m (331 ft)	1978	
4	Norwich Cathedral	Norwich, Norfolk		96 m (315 ft)	1480	
5	Church of St Walburge, Preston	Preston, Lancashire		94 m (308 ft)	1854	
6	St Mary's Cathedral, Edinburgh (Episcopal)	Edinburgh, Scotland		90 m (300 ft)	1917	
7	St James' Church, Louth	Louth, Lincolnshire		89.9 m (295 ft)	1515	
8	St Mary Redcliffe	Bristol		89 m (292 ft)	1872	
9=	Liverpool Metropolitan Cathedral	Liverpool, Merseyside		87 m (285 ft)	1967	
9=	Westminster Cathedral	City of Westminster, London		87 m (285 ft)	1903	
11=	St Wulfram's Church, Grantham	Grantham, Lincolnshire		86 m (282 ft)	1360	
11=	St Elphin's Church, Warrington	Warrington, Cheshire		86 m (282 ft)	1867	
13	St Mary Abbots	Kensington, London		85 m (279 ft)	1872	
14	Chichester Cathedral	Chichester, Sussex		84.5 m (277 ft)		
15=	Lincoln Cathedral	Lincoln, Lincolnshire		83 m (272 ft)	1253	
15=	St Botolph's Church	Boston, Lincolnshire		83 m (272 ft)	1520	
16	Chichester Cathedral	Chichester, West Sussex		82 m (269 ft)	1258	

=== Tallest university buildings ===
Rank	Building	Location	Image	Height	Year	Notes
1	Glasgow University Tower	Glasgow, Scotland		85 m (279 ft)	1887	
2	Arts Tower	Sheffield, South Yorkshire		78 m (256 ft)	1966	
3	Broadcasting Tower, Leeds	Leeds, West Yorkshire		69.5 m (228 ft)	2009	
4=	Wills Memorial Building	Bristol		68 m (223 ft)	1925	
4=	Towers Hall	Loughborough, Leicestershire		68 m (223 ft)	1967	
6	Senate House (University of London)	Bloomsbury, London		64 m (210 ft)	1937	

=== Tallest cinema buildings ===
Cineworld Glasgow (Glasgow, Scotland) - 62 m (203 ft)

== Tallest structures ==
Tallest guyed mast

Skelton transmitting station (Skelton, Cumbria) - 365 m (1,198 ft)

Tallest freestanding structure

Emley Moor transmitting station (Emley, West Yorkshire) - 330 m (1,080 ft)

Tallest chimney

Drax Power Station (Drax, North Yorkshire) - 259 m (850 ft)

Tallest free-standing lattice tower

Crystal Palace transmitting station 219 m (719 ft)

Tallest wind turbine

Samsung Heavy Industries 7 MW wind turbine prototype 196 m (643 ft)

Tallest electricity pylon

400 kV Thames Crossing 190.5 m (625 ft)

Tallest bridge

Queensferry Crossing (Lothian and Fife) - 207 m (679 ft)

Tallest observation tower

Spinnaker Tower (Portsmouth, Hampshire) - 170 m (560 ft)

Tallest ferris wheel

London Eye (Lambeth, London) - 135 m (443 ft)

Tallest stadium

Wembley Stadium (Brent, London) - 133 m (436 ft)

Tallest lighthouse

Skerryvore Lighthouse (Skerryvore, Scotland) - 48 m (157 ft)

Tallest church spire

Salisbury Cathedral (Salisbury, Wiltshire) - 123 m (404 ft)

Tallest clock tower

Joseph Chamberlain Memorial Clock Tower (Birmingham, West Midlands) - 100 m (330 ft)

Tallest domed building

Millennium Dome (Greenwich, London) - 95 m (312 ft)

Tallest water tower

Grimsby Dock Tower (Grimsby, Lincolnshire) - 94 m (308 ft)

Tallest telescope

Lovell Telescope (Goostrey, Cheshire) - 89 m (292 ft)

Tallest air traffic control tower

Heathrow Air Traffic Control Tower (Hillingdon, London) - 87 m (285 ft)

Tallest monument

Wallace Monument (Stirling, Scotland) - 67 m (220 ft)

Tallest rollercoaster

Hyperia (Thorpe Park, Chertsey, Surrey) - 72 m (236 ft)

Tallest sculpture

ArcelorMittal Orbit (Stratford, London) - 115 m (377 ft)

Tallest pagoda

The Pagoda (Richmond upon Thames, London) - 50 m (160 ft)

Tallest mosque

Birmingham Central mosque (Birmingham) - 45.7 m (150 ft)

Tallest windmill

Moulton Windmill (Moulton, Lincolnshire) - 30 m (98 ft)

Tallest statue

Angel of the North (Gateshead, Tyne and Wear) - 20 m (66 ft)

Dream (St Helens, Merseyside) - 20 m (66 ft)
