= Canary Wharf =

Major business and financial district in London

Coordinates: 51.5050°N 0.0225°W

- Central business district
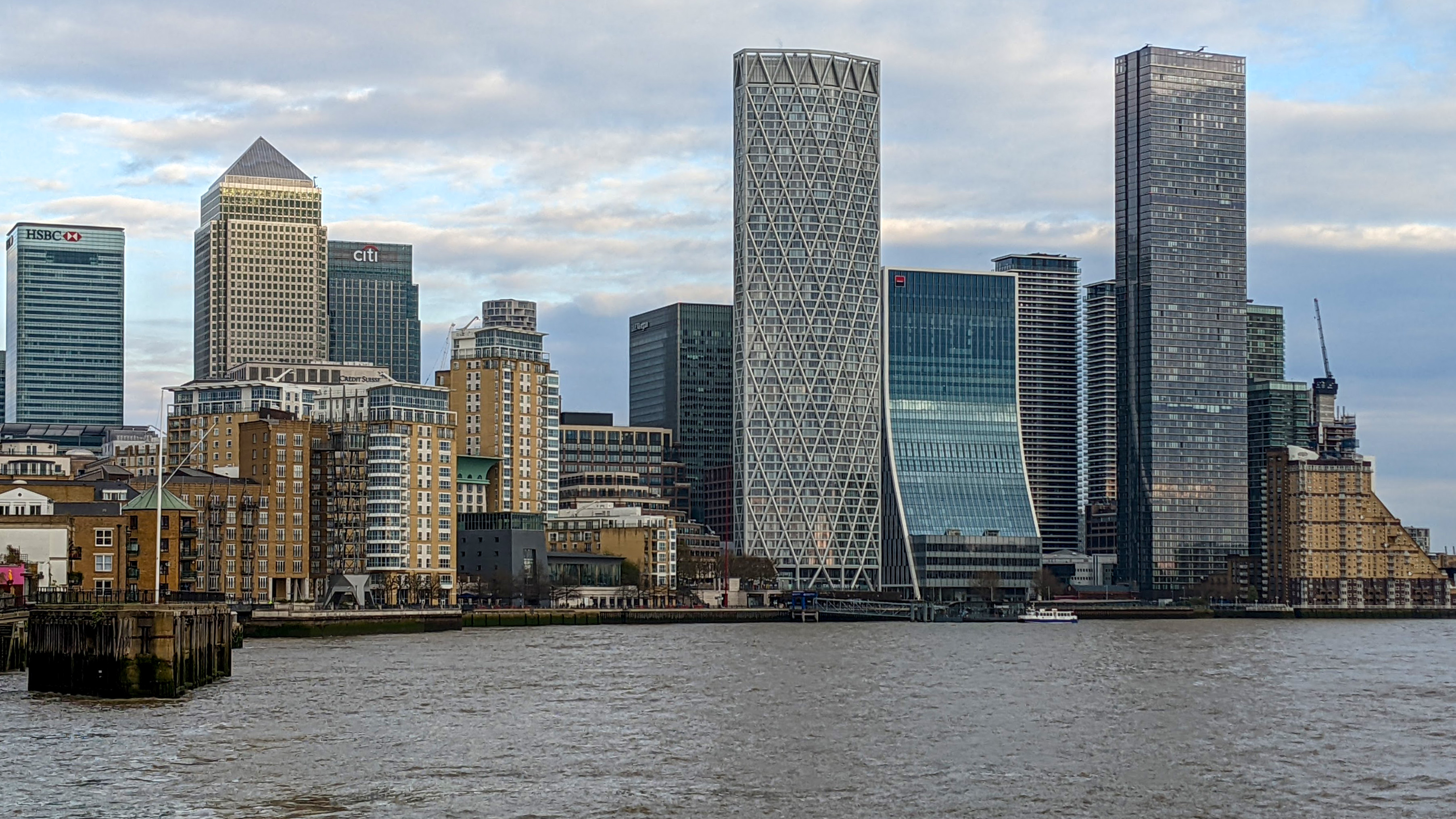
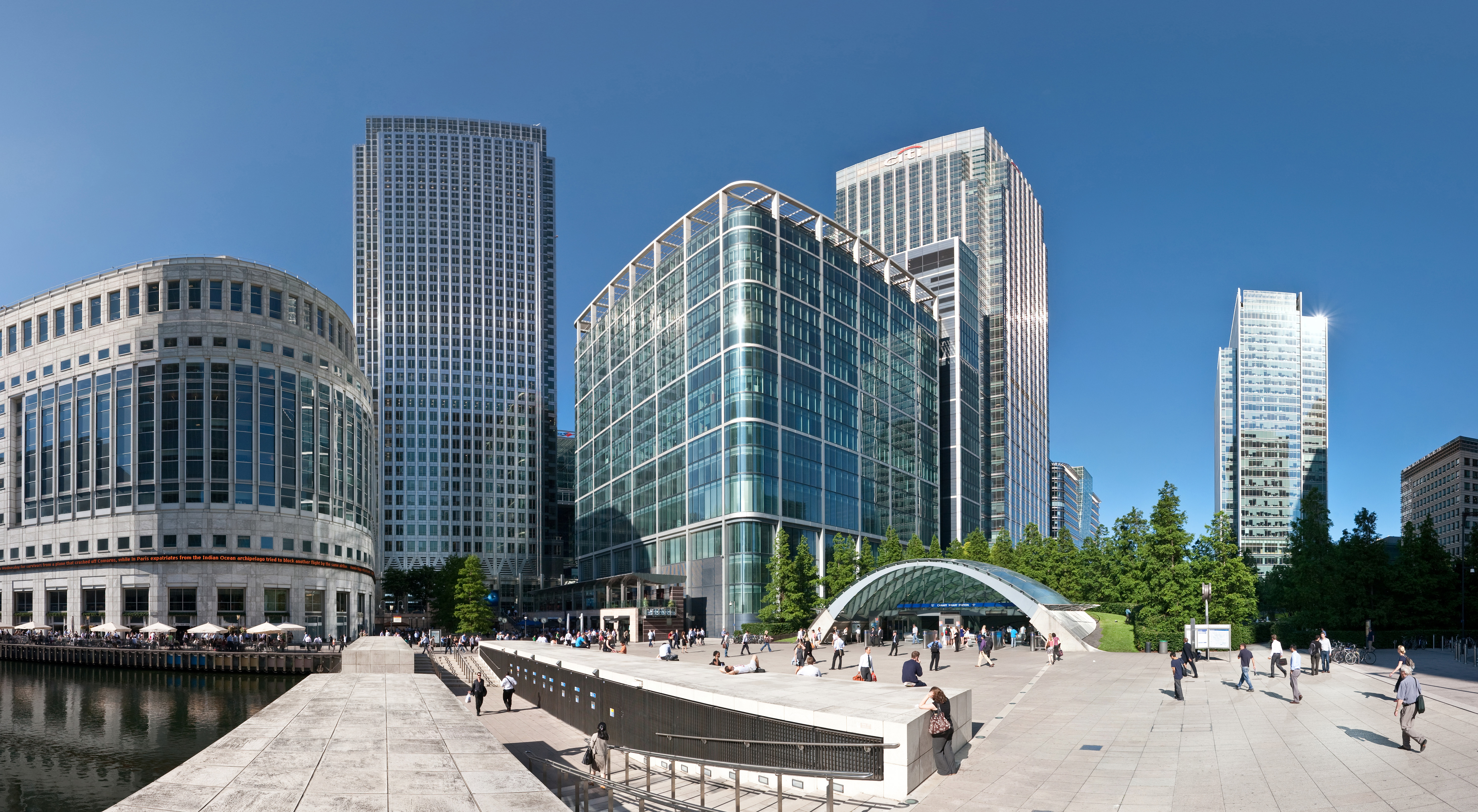
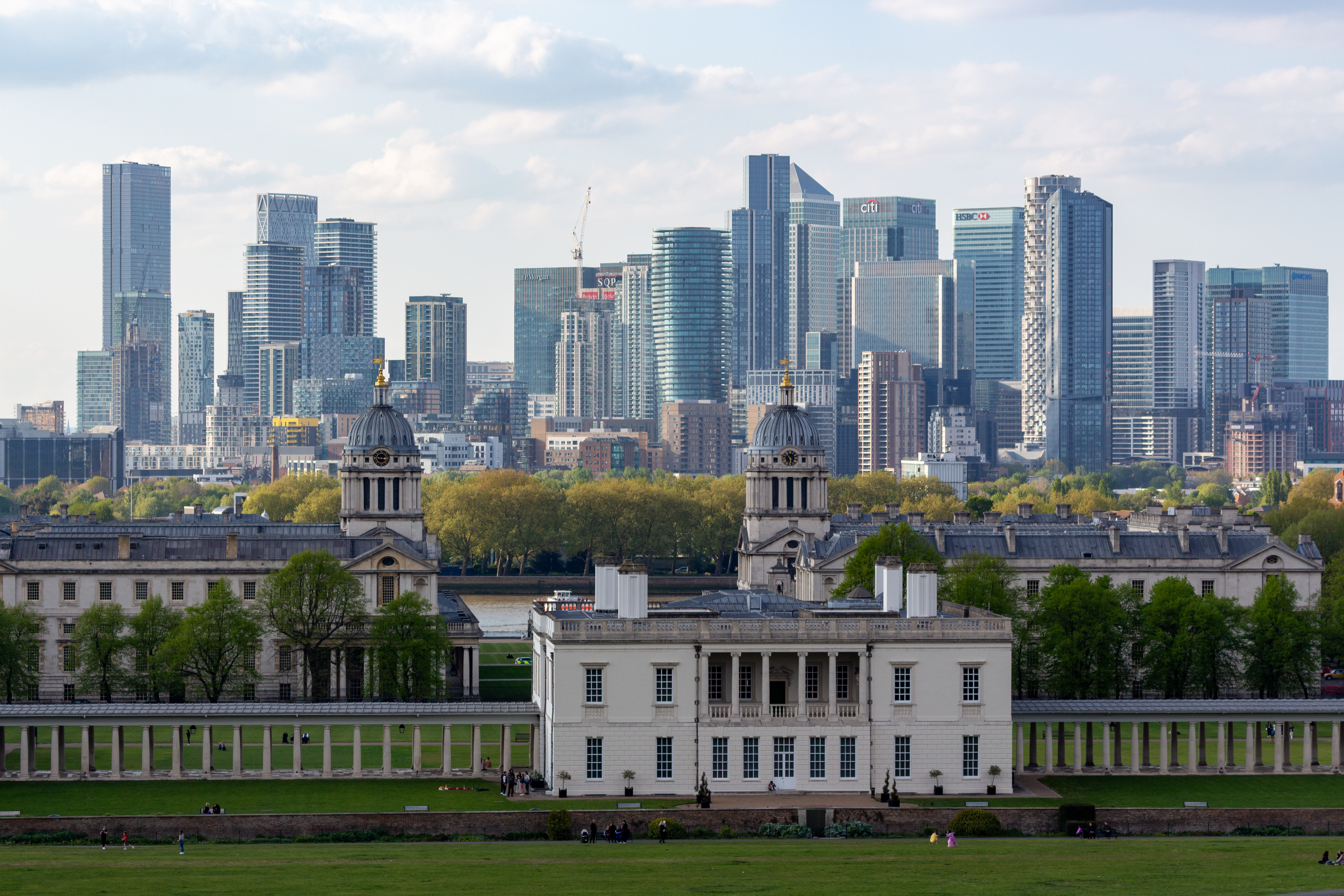
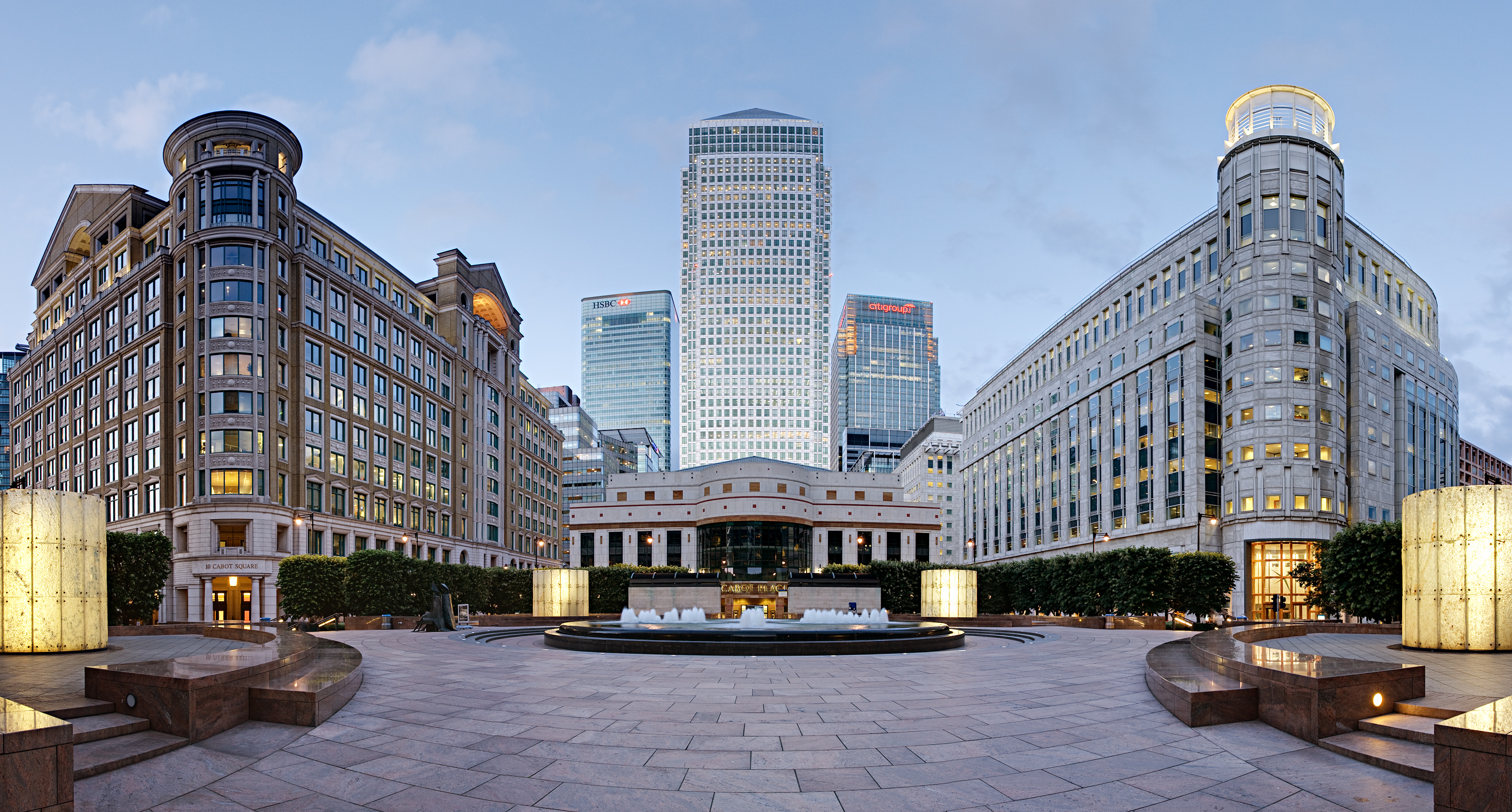
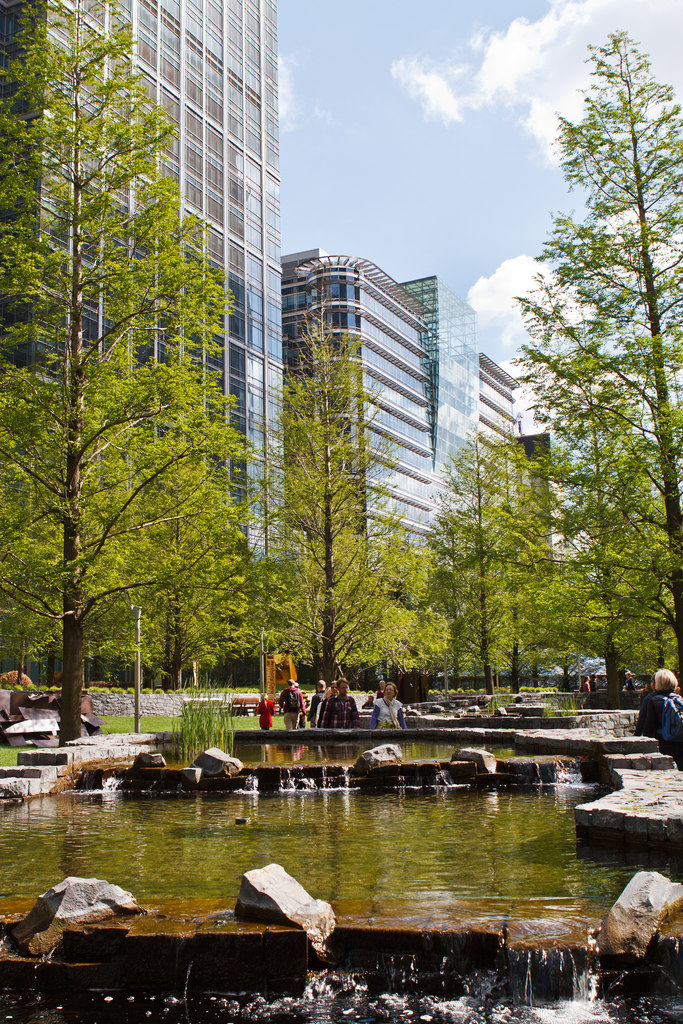
- From top, left to right: view from Limehouse; South Colonnade and Canada Square behind Canary Wharf tube station; skyline from Greenwich; Cabot Square; Jubilee Park

- Location within Greater London
- OS grid reference: TQ375802
- London borough: Tower Hamlets
- Ceremonial county: Greater London
- Region: London
- Country: England
- Sovereign state: United Kingdom
- Post town: London
- Postcode district: E14
- Dialling code: 020
- Police: Metropolitan
- Fire: London
- Ambulance: London
- UK Parliament: Poplar and Limehouse
- London Assembly: City and East

Canary Wharf is a privately owned central business district in London, England, located in the Isle of Dogs, Tower Hamlets. With the City of London and the West End, it constitutes one of the main financial centres in the United Kingdom and the world, and it is home to many of the world’s major financial corporations, including the headquarters of more than 150 major businesses.

The district was developed on the site of the former West India Docks in East London. Canary Wharf, together with Heron Quays and Wood Wharf, forms the Canary Wharf Estate, covering around 97 acres (39 ha).

== History ==
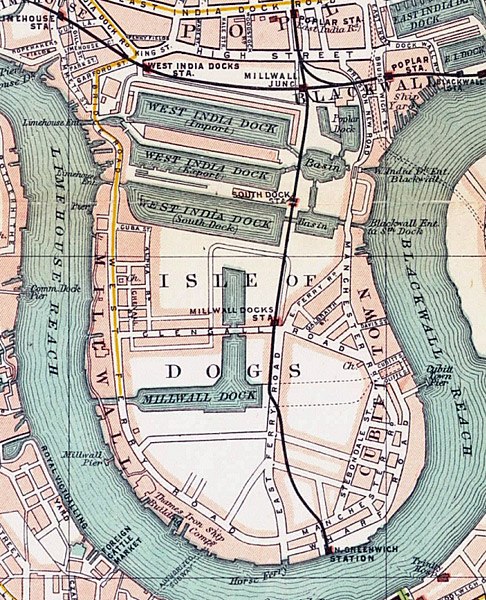
Canary Wharf in 1899, showing the West India Docks and the Isle of Dogs

=== West India Dock Company ===
From 1802 until the late 1980s, the area now known as the Canary Wharf Estate was part of the Isle of Dogs (specifically Millwall) and Poplar. The West India Docks, a central feature of the area, were primarily developed by Robert Milligan (c. 1746–1809), who founded the West India Dock Company.

=== Port of London Authority ===
The Port of London Authority was established in 1909 and took control of the West India Dock. The enterprise of Alfred Lewis Jones, a Welsh shipping magnate and a prominent figure in the Canary Islands, Spain, led to a constant stream of ships arriving into London's South Quay Dock. No. 32 berth of West Wood Quay in the Import Dock was built in 1936 with a two-storey transit shed for Fruit Lines Ltd, a subsidiary of Fred Olsen Lines, for the Mediterranean and Canary Islands fruit trade, gaining the name Canary Wharf.

=== London Docklands Development Corporation ===
After the 1960s, when cargo became containerised, the port industry began to decline, leading to the closure of all the docks by 1980. After the docks closed in 1980, the British Government adopted policies to stimulate redevelopment of the area, including the creation of the London Docklands Development Corporation (LDDC) in 1981 and the granting of Urban Enterprise Zone status to the Isle of Dogs in 1982.

The Canary Wharf of today began when Michael von Clemm, former chairman of Credit Suisse First Boston (CSFB), came up with the idea to convert Canary Wharf into a back office. Further discussions with G Ware Travelstead led to proposals for a new business district and included the LDDC developing an inexpensive light metro scheme, the Docklands Light Railway, to make use of a large amount of redundant railway infrastructure and to improve access.

The project was sold to the Canadian company Olympia & York and construction began in 1988, master-planned by Skidmore, Owings & Merrill with Yorke Rosenberg Mardall as their UK advisors, and subsequently by Koetter Kim. The first buildings were completed in 1991, including One Canada Square, which became the UK's tallest building at the time and a symbol of the regeneration of Docklands. By the time it opened, the London commercial property market had collapsed, and Olympia and York Canary Wharf Limited filed for bankruptcy in May 1992.

Initially, the City of London saw Canary Wharf as an existential threat. It modified its planning laws to expand the provision of new offices in the City of London, for example, creating offices above railway stations (Blackfriars) and roads (Alban Gate). The resulting oversupply of office space contributed to the failure of the Canary Wharf project.

=== Canary Wharf Group ===
In October 1995, an international consortium that included investors such as Alwaleed, bought control of the Canary Wharf Group for $1.2 billion. Paul Reichmann (of Olympia & York) was named chairman, and Canary Wharf went public in 1999. The new company was called Canary Wharf Limited, and later became Canary Wharf Group.

In 1997, some residents living on the Isle of Dogs issued a claim against Canary Wharf Ltd (Hunter v Canary Wharf Ltd) for private nuisance because One Canada Square, owned by the company, interfered with TV signals. However, the residents lost the case.

Recovery in the property market generally, coupled with continuing demand for large floorplate Grade A office space, slowly improved the level of interest. A critical event in the recovery was the much-delayed start of work on the Jubilee Line Extension, which the government wanted ready for the Millennium celebrations.

In March 2004, Canary Wharf Group plc. was taken over by a consortium of investors, backed by its largest shareholder Glick Family Investments and led by Morgan Stanley using a vehicle named Songbird Estates plc.

== Tallest buildings ==
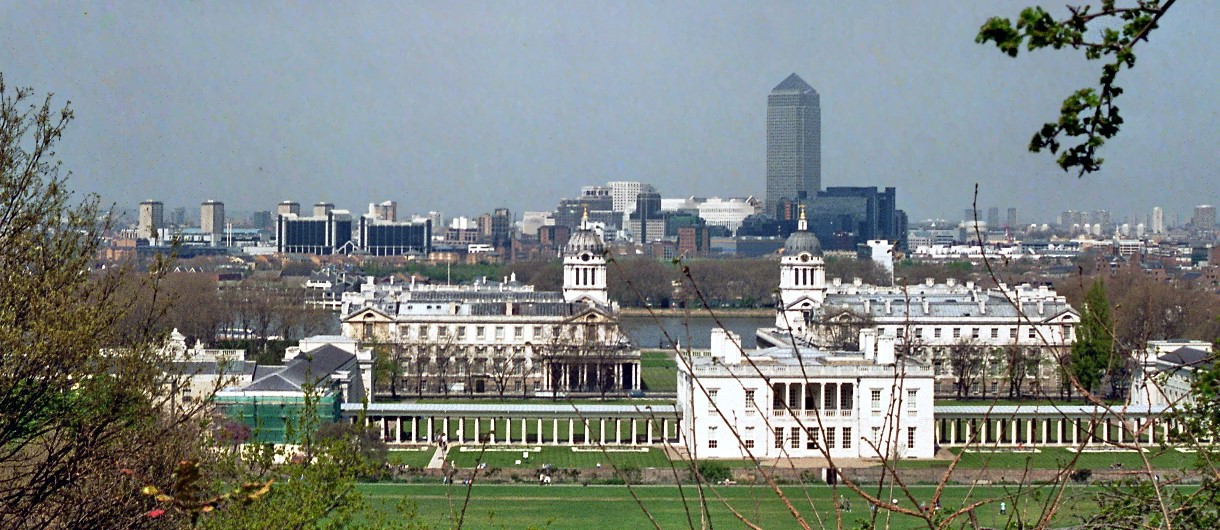
One Canada Square was the tallest building in London and the only skyscraper in Canary Wharf in April 1995.

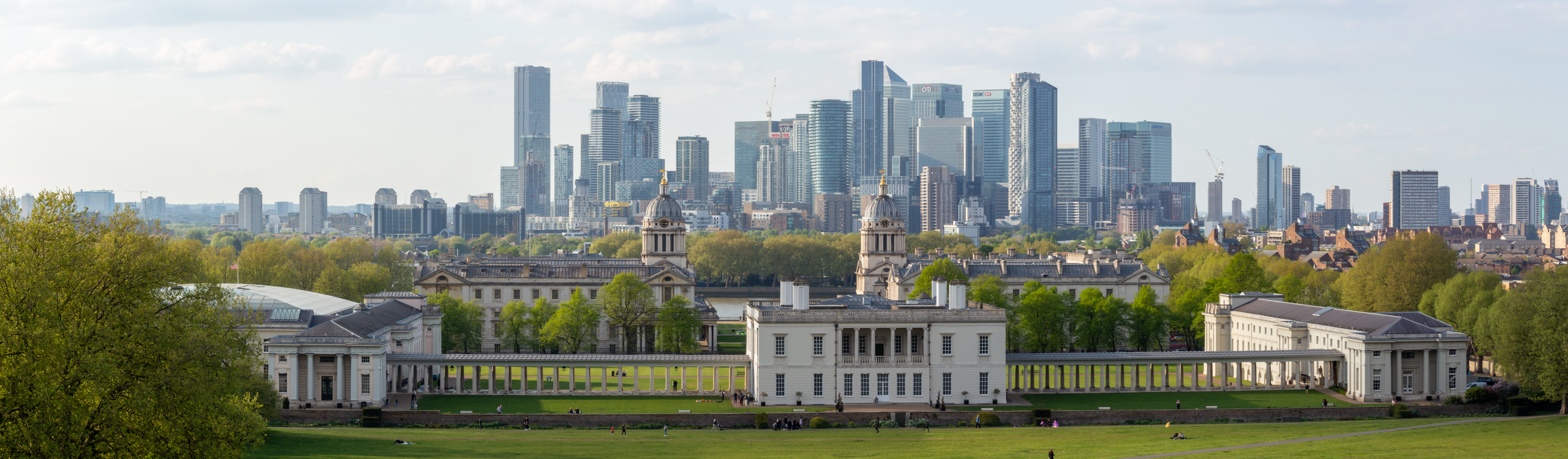
The same view in April 2022 shows One Canada Square surrounded by a cluster of skyscrapers.

In addition to being a leading global financial district in the United Kingdom, Canary Wharf is famous for a cluster of tall modern commercial complexes and residential high-rise buildings. Built from scratch since the early 1990s, Canary Wharf's rapid grown skyscraper cluster has dramatically transformed the skyline of London with modern architecture.

- As of August 2024, six of the United Kingdom's ten tallest buildings are located at Canary Wharf.
- One Canada Square (235 m (771 ft)) and Landmark Pinnacle (233 m (764 ft)) are the third and fourth tallest buildings in the United Kingdom. Newfoundland (220 m (720 ft)), Aspen at Consort Place (216 m (708 ft)), South Quay Plaza (215 m (705 ft)), and One Park Drive (205 m (673 ft)) hold the seventh to tenth positions.
- The 75-storey Landmark Pinnacle is the tallest residential tower in Western Europe.
- Newfoundland is the tallest build-to-rent building in the United Kingdom.
- 40 Marsh Wall (Novotel London Canary Wharf) is the tallest all-hotel building in the United Kingdom, and the tallest Novotel in the world.
- One Canada Square, at 235 m (771 ft), achieved a 21-year record of the tallest building in the United Kingdom from 1991 to 2012. With its distinctive pyramid pinnacle, the building is recognised as a London landmark, and has been featured in many films and television shows.

In April 2026, JPMorgan Chase reached agreement with London City Airport over height restrictions and began preparing a planning application for a £3 billion, 265 metres (869 ft) tower at Riverside South that, when completed, will overtake One Canada Square as the tallest building in Canary Wharf.

List of completed buildings in Canary Wharf that are at least 100 m (330 ft) tall
Ranking by height	Image	Name	Height		Floors	Completion date	Notes
Ranking by height	Image	Name	Metres	Feet	Floors	Completion date	Notes
1		One Canada Square	235	771	50	1991	Designed by Cesar Pelli. Multi-tenanted; occupiers include BNY Mellon, the CFA Institute, Clearstream, European Energy Exchange, Euler Hermes, the International Sugar Organization, Mahindra Satyam, MetLife, Moody's Analytics and Reach.
2		Landmark Pinnacle	233	764	75	2020	Residential tower. The tallest residential tower in Western Europe.
3		Newfoundland	220	722	60	2019	The first residential building built on the Canary Wharf private estate. Known as "the diamond tower" due to its distinctive diamond-pattern steel exoskeleton design.
4		Aspen at Consort Place	216	708	67	2024	Residential / Hotel.
5		South Quay Plaza (Phase 1, Hampton Court)	215	705	68	2020	Residential tower. Also known as Valiant Tower
6		One Park Drive	205	673	57	2019	Residential tower. Wood Wharf's flagship residential building.
7		8 Canada Square	200	655	42	2002	The joint eleventh-tallest completed building in the United Kingdom. Occupied by HSBC as its global headquarters.
8		25 Canada Square	200	655	42	2001	The joint eleventh-tallest completed building in the United Kingdom. 25 Canada Square and 33 Canada Square together form a single complex known as the Citigroup Centre. Primarily occupied by Citigroup as its EMEA headquarters. Other tenants include Gain Capital, 3i Infotech, Crossrail, Instinet, Munich Re, MWB Group, FIS, Interoute, NYK and Wells Fargo.
9		Harcourt Gardens (South Quay Plaza Tower 4, Harcourt Tower, SQP4)	192	631	56	2024	Residential tower.
10		Wardian London (East Tower)	187	614	55	2019	Residential tower.
11		Amory Tower (The Madison)	182	597	53	2019	Residential tower.
12	Wardian London - West Tower - Canary Wharf, Isle of Dogs - May 2024 (2)	Wardian London (West Tower)	168	552	50	2019	Residential tower.
13		50-60 Charter Street, Tower 1	161	528	49	2024	Residential tower. Also known as Wood Wharf J3.
14		One Thames Quay (225 Marsh Wall)	158	517	49	2024	Residential tower. Situated at 225 Marsh Wall, the sister tower to the Amory Tower.
15		One Churchill Place	156	513	32	2005	Occupied by Barclays as its global headquarters.
16=		40 Bank Street	153	502	33	2003	Multi-tenanted; occupiers include Allen & Overy, ANZ Bank, China Construction Bank, Duff & Phelps, Saxo Bank, and Skadden, Arps, Slate, Meagher & Flom.
16=		25 Bank Street	153	502	33	2003	Occupied by JPMorgan Chase as its European headquarters since 2012.
18		10 Upper Bank Street	151	495	32	2003	Occupied by Clifford Chance as its global headquarters. Other occupiers include FTSE Group, Infosys, Mastercard, Deutsche Bank, and Total.
19		10 Park Drive; Wood Wharf	150	492	43	2019	Residential tower. The first residential development to be built in Wood Wharf.
20		Arena Tower (Baltimore Tower)	149	489	45	2017	Residential tower.
21		Pan Peninsula (East Tower)	147	484	48	2008	Residential tower.
22		Maine Tower (Harbour Central Block D)	144	472	42	2018	Residential tower. Centrepiece of Harbour Central development containing seven buildings. Also see Harbour Central Block C (Sirocco Tower).
23		One & Five Bank Street	143	469	28	2019	Commercial tower. European Bank for Reconstruction and Development relocated its headquarters to Five Bank Street in 2022.
24		24 Marsh Wall (Landmark East Tower)	140	458	44	2010	Residential tower
25=		40 Marsh Wall (Novotel London Canary Wharf)	128	420	39	2017	Hotel operating as 'Novotel Canary Wharf'
25=		10 George Street; Wood Wharf	128	420	35	2018	Residential tower, the first of three build-to-rent properties commissioned by Vertus, the rental arm of the Canary Wharf group.
27		Harbour Central Block C (Sirocco Tower)	125	409	36	2018	Residential tower. Sirocco tower was the first built out of the 7 buildings on the Harbour Central site. Also see Maine Tower.
28		Pan Peninsula (West Tower)	122	400	39	2008	Residential tower. (see Pan Peninsula East Tower)
29		Alta at Consort Place	121	400	36	2024	Residential / education.
30		25 Churchill Place	118	387	24	2014	The building housed the European Medicines Agency from early 2014 until March 2019 when they relocated to Amsterdam and Ernst & Young from 2015.
31		50-60 Charter Street, Tower 2	112	367	34	2024	Residential tower. Also known as Wood Wharf J1.
32		Dollar Bay Tower	109	358	31	2016	Residential tower.
33		1 West India Quay	108	354	36	2004	Residential (158 apartments) and a Marriott Hotel. Was the tallest residential building in the UK when completed in 2004.
34		33 Canada Square	105	344	18	1999	33 Canada Square and 25 Canada Square together form a single complex, see above for details.

== Listed buildings ==
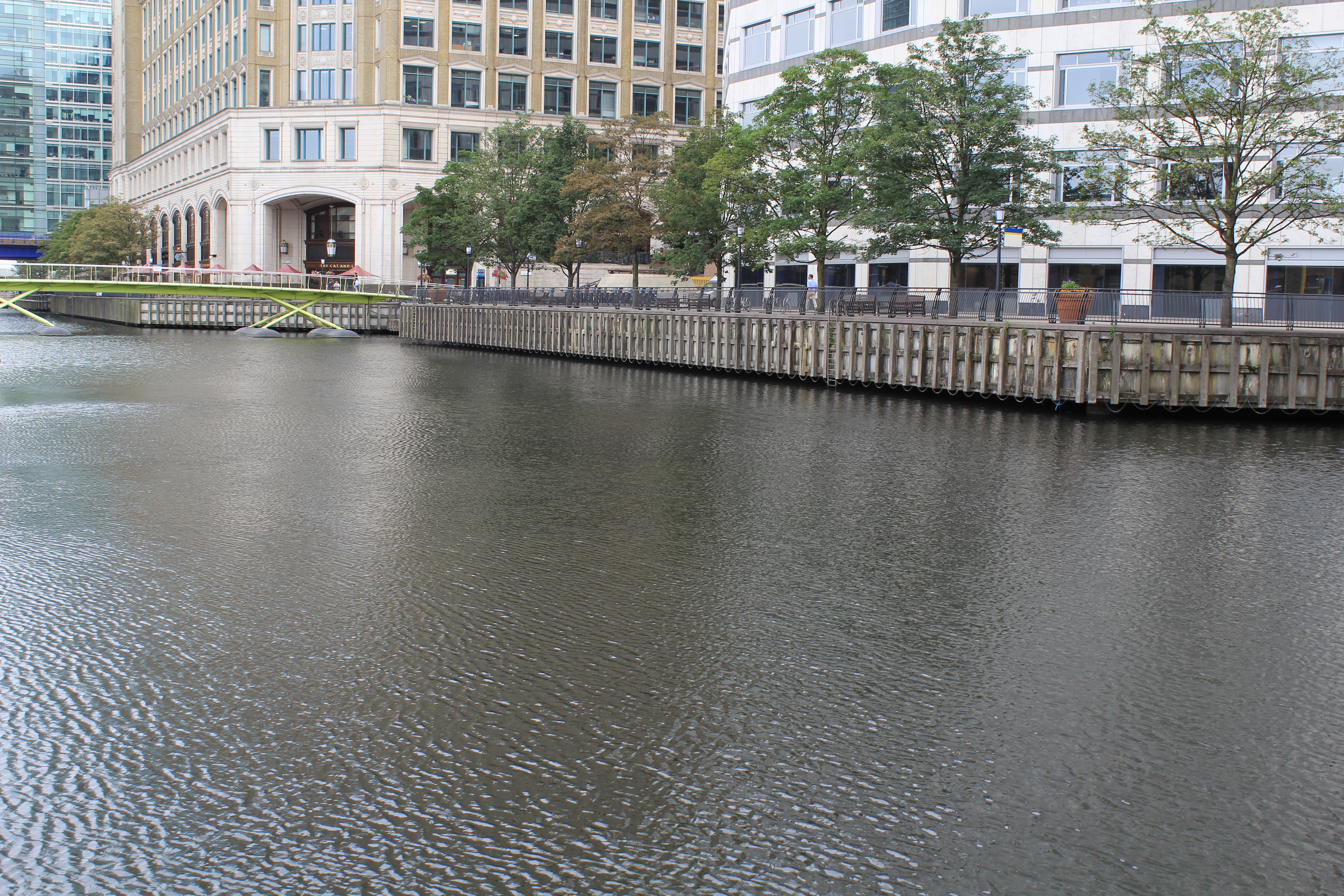
Quay walls, copings and buttresses to Import Dock and Export Dock

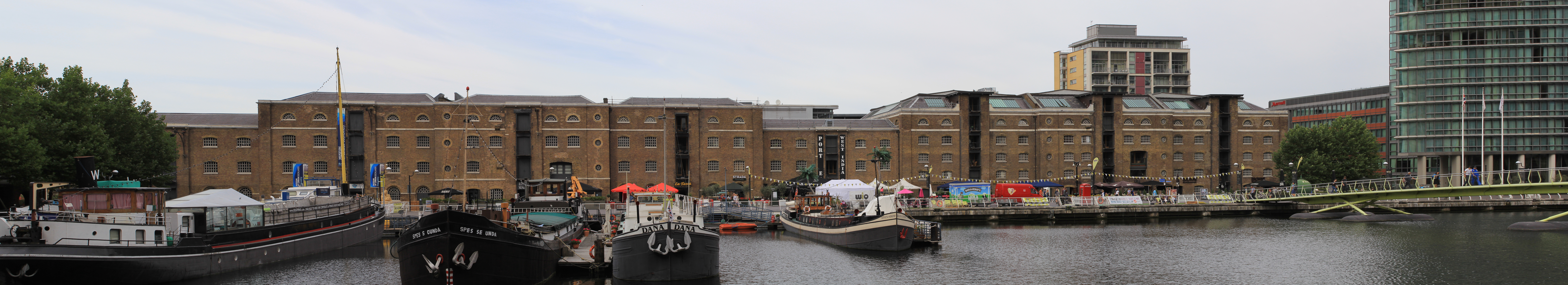
Warehouses and general offices at western end of North Quay

As of 12 February 2023, there are 16 listed buildings in Canary Wharf of which 2 are grade I and 14 grade II.

=== Grade I listed buildings ===
- Quay walls, copings and buttresses to Import Dock and Export Dock: the original West India Docks consists of three docks. The Import Dock, the earliest, was opened in 1800–02, and followed to south by the Export Dock of 1803–06.
- Warehouses and general offices at the western end of North Quay: originally a range of nine warehouses was built 1800–04 at the western end of North Quay, West India Dock Road. Only two warehouses survived the bombing raids of World War II.

These docks along with Nos 1 and 2 warehouses are now the only surviving examples of the first intensive period of London Docklands construction: 1800–10.

=== Grade II listed buildings ===
Most of the grade II listed buildings in Canary Wharf sit to the north-west of West India Dock North, and are located within the West India Dock conservation area. In addition to architectural values, "these buildings and structures are of significance due to their association with the development of the docks and the community that grew up around them".

Photograph	Building name	Construction date	Location (E14 postal district)	Listing date	Description
	10 and 12, Garford Street E14	1800s, early	Garford Street	27 September 1973	Early 19th century pairs of stock brick houses. These cottages were originally built for the officers and sergeants who supervised the Docks.
	14, Garford Street E14	1800s, early	Garford Street	27 September 1973	Early 19th century stock brick house.
	16 and 18, Garford Street E14	1800s, early	Garford Street	27 September 1973	Early 19th century pairs of stock brick houses.
	Entrance gates to West India Docks	1800s, early	West India Dock Road	19 July 1950	Two rusticated Portland stone piers with a capping of four dwarf pediments and acroteria.
	Former west entrance gate to West India Docks with curved walling and bollards	1900s, early	Westferry Road	1 July 1983	Stock brick curved wing walls and Portland stone gatepiers. Modern brick wall blocks entrance. Two cast-iron obelisk pattern bollards with the inscription WIDC (West India Dock Company).
	Railings to west of main gate at West India Docks	1800s, early	West India Dock Road	30 September 1981	Cast iron railings approximately 70 yards in length.
	Former excise office	1807	West India Dock Road	30 September 1981	Also known as Dockmaster's House, by the architect and engineer Thomas Morris.
	Railings and gatepiers to former excise office	1807	West India Dock Road	30 September 1981	Contemporary iron railings with six rusticated stucco gatepiers on street front. The stucco decoration of the piers elaborated mid 19th century.
	Quadrangle Stores at West India Dock	1825	West India Dock Road	30 September 1981	Also known as Cannon Workshops, by engineer John Rennie the Younger. A rare survival of an early purpose built illustrative of the workings of the Docks Company.
	Salvation Army hostel	1905	Garford Street	27 September 1973	Neo Georgian style building by architectural partnership Niven and Wigglesworth. Also known as: 20 Garford Street.
	West India Dock former guard house	1803	West India Dock Road	27 September 1973	A one-storey, small circular building designed by architect George Gwilt. It originally formed one of a pair built by Docks Company as a lock-up and armoury.
	Former west entrance lock to South Dock, West India Docks	1803-05	Westferry Road	1 July 1983	By civil engineer William Jessop, built as the west entrance lock to the City Canal, later taken into the West India Docks system.
	Fitch and Sons Works	1870-80	Westferry Road	1 July 1983	A good example of the smaller warehouses in the historical West India Docks, with built in retail outlet on ground floor, a now rare feature.
	Cascades	1987-88	Westferry Road	18 April 2018	A 20-storey residential tower by CZWG, exemplary of British post-modernist architecture practice and an important residential scheme of the late 20th century British town planning and industrial reclamation.

== Corporations and agencies ==
Canary Wharf contains around 16,000,000 sq ft (1,500,000 m^{2}) of office and retail space, of which around 7,900,000 sq ft (730,000 m^{2}) (about 49%) is owned by Canary Wharf Group. Around 105,000 people work in Canary Wharf, and it is home to the world or European headquarters of numerous major banks, professional services firms, and media organisations, including Barclays, Citigroup, Clifford Chance, Credit Suisse, Ernst & Young, Fitch Ratings, HSBC, Infosys, JPMorgan Chase, KPMG, MetLife, Moody's, Morgan Stanley, Royal Bank of Canada, Deutsche Bank, S&P Global, Skadden, Arps, Slate, Meagher & Flom, State Street, The Economist Group, and Thomson Reuters. Until 2018, Canary Wharf also hosted two European Union agencies, European Medicines Agency and European Banking Authority, that moved to Amsterdam and Paris respectively due to Brexit.

There is a "Government hub" office at 10 South Colonnade, which houses over 6,000 civil servants from eight departments of the Government of the United Kingdom.

== Leisure ==
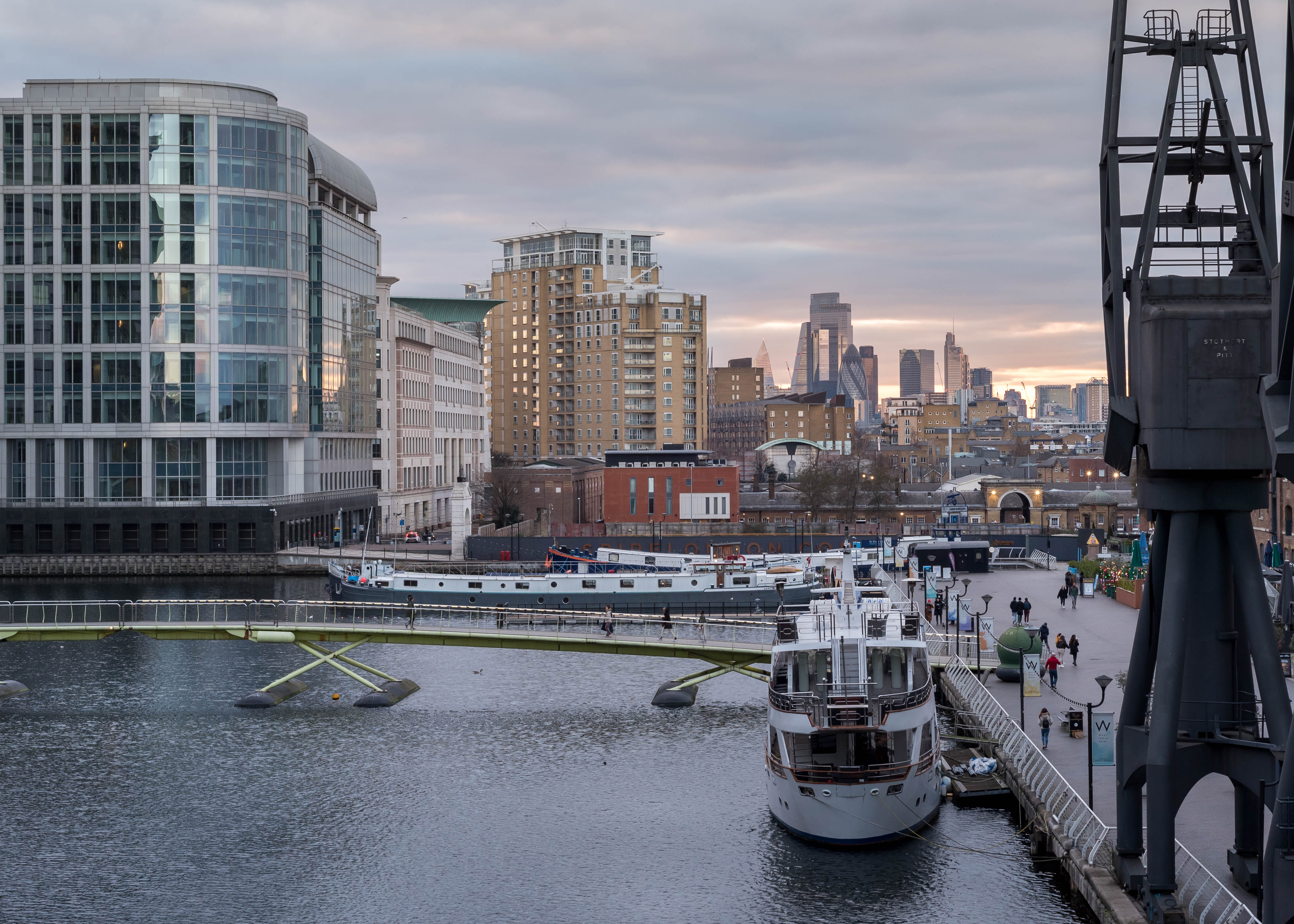
West India Quay

=== Marina ===
West India Quays and Poplar Dock are two marinas that are used as moorings for barges and private leisure river craft. They are owned by the Canal & River Trust.

=== Library ===
A local public library, called Idea Store Canary Wharf, is in Churchill Place shopping mall and run by Tower Hamlets Council. It opened in 2006 as part of the Idea Store project and is the borough's fourth Idea Store.

=== Cinema ===
Canary Wharf hosts two multiplexes (cinemas), one on West India Quay run by Cineworld. and another at Crossrail Place run by Everyman Cinemas.

=== Restaurants and hospitality ===
The Canary Wharf estate includes more than 80 restaurants, bars, and cafés. Market data indicates that the median cost for private celebrations and gatherings within the area's venues is approximately £338.

=== Theatre ===
The Troubadour Canary Wharf Theatre, a new purpose-built 1,200-seat auditorium, opens its inaugural season in autumn 2025 with the world premiere of The Hunger Games: On Stage.

Theatreship: a floating theatre and cinema on a converted historic cargo ship is moored on the Canal & River Trust's 'Arts and Heritage Berth' in Canary Wharf.

=== Go Karting ===
An over 800m long electric karting facility exists within Cabot Square. The facility can accommodate up to 20 drivers at a time. Karts can reach speeds of up to 45 mph.

=== Mini Golf Pitch ===
A free mini golf pitch has been created with a 9-hole course in Montgomery Square.

== Squares and public areas ==
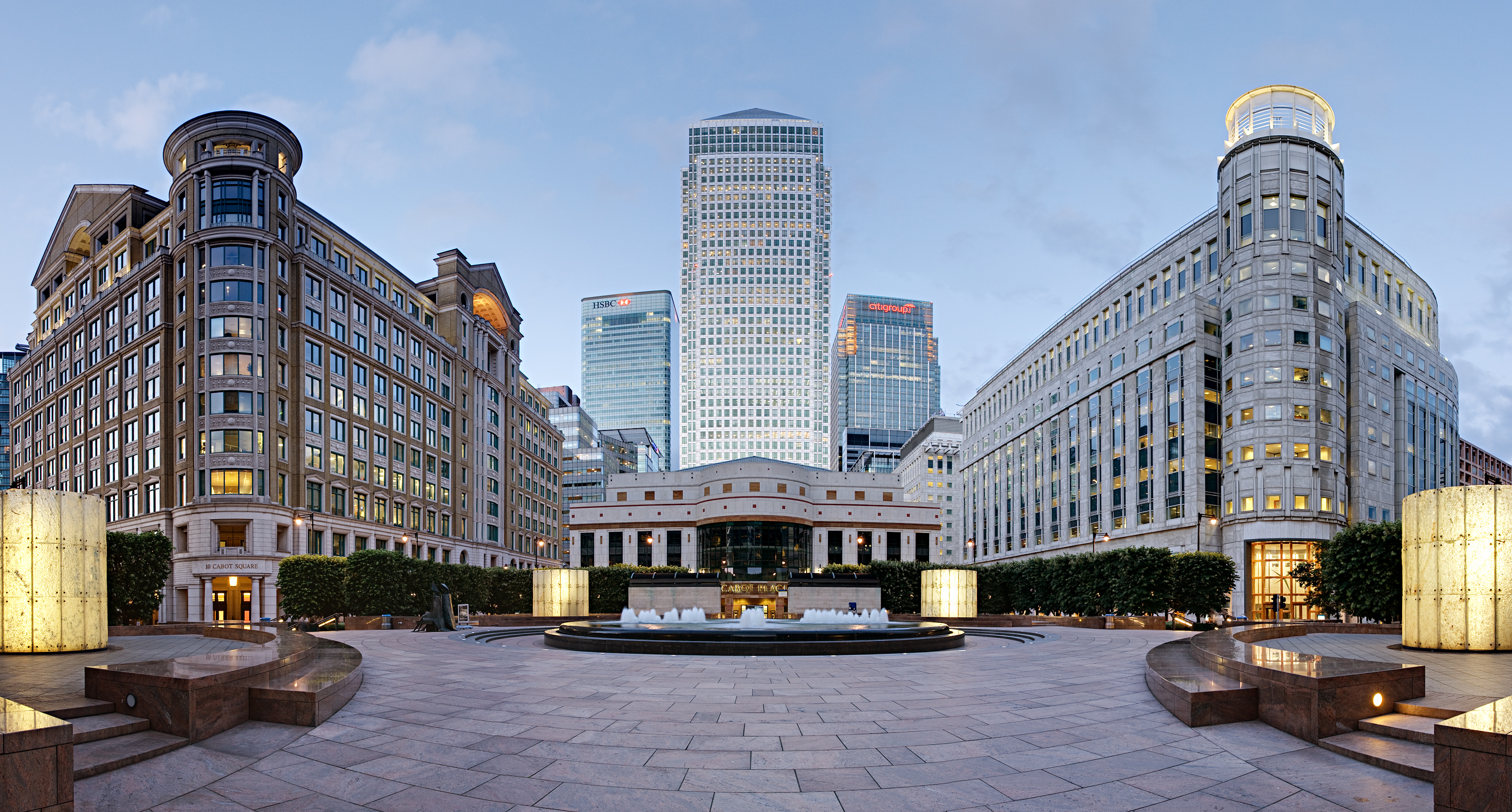
East view from Cabot Square

Canada Square is one of the central squares at Canary Wharf. It is a large open space with grass, except during the winter when it is converted into an ice rink. The square is named after Canada, because the original developers of modern Canary Wharf, Olympia & York, wanted to reflect their heritage as a Canadian company. Underneath the square is Canada Place shopping mall.

Westferry Circus is on the west side of Canary Wharf. It is a garden at ground level, and below is a roundabout allowing traffic to flow through. The garden is enclosed by bespoke hand-crafted ornamental railings and entrance gates by artist Giuseppe Lund. The area has a long history, dating back to 1812, when the Poplar and Greenwich Roads Company operated a horse ferry between Greenwich and the Isle of Dogs. It operated on the West Ferry and East Ferry Roads, which the names survived. Westferry Circus was chosen as the name for the roundabout and park by virtue of its proximity to Westferry Road.

Cabot Square is one of the biggest squares at Canary Wharf, with a large fountain at the centre. The inner perimeter has additional fountains covered by trees. The square has large circular glass ventilation holes to allow gases to escape from the underground car park. The square is named after John Cabot and his son Sebastian, who were Italian explorers who settled in England in 1484.

Churchill Place is an area on the east side of Canary Wharf. It is named after Winston Churchill.

Columbus Courtyard is a small square on the west side of Canary Wharf named after Christopher Columbus. The first phase of Canary Wharf was completed in 1992, 500 years after Columbus arrived in America.

Chancellor Passage is a passageway south of Cabot Square. Named after Richard Chancellor who sailed with Sir John Willoughby from Greenwich on their voyage through the White Sea to Moscow.

Wren Landing is small area north of Cabot Square. Leads to North Dock footbridge towards Port East. Named after British architect Christopher Wren.

Montgomery Square, located at the east end of Jubilee Park, is an outdoor location for socialising. Events include street food markets, beach volleyball tournaments, paddle tennis competition, and minigolf.

== Parks and green spaces ==
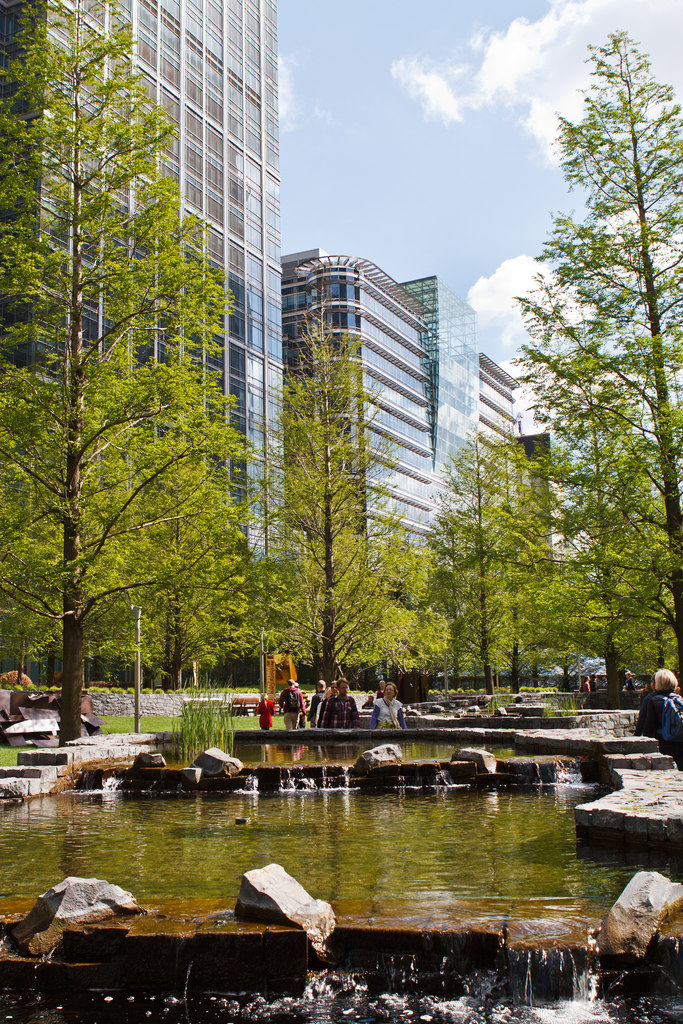
Raised serpentine water channel at Jubilee Park

Jubilee Park is a 10,000 m^{2} roof garden located above Jubilee Place, a shopping mall, and Canary Wharf Jubilee Station, an underground railway station. The park, opened in 2002 and was named in honour of the Golden Jubilee of Elizabeth II. Jubilee Park is located in the financial district of Canary Wharf. The park's central feature is a raised serpentine water channel with rough stone walls. The curvilinear design of the water channel is intended to contrast to the scale and straightness of the surrounding buildings. In 2023, Jubilee Park won the Green Flag Award, recognising Jubilee Park as one of the United Kingdom's best parks

Crossrail Place has a 4,160 m^{2} (44,800 sq ft) roof garden, one of London's largest, housed on the top of seven-storey Elizabeth line Canary Wharf station. Opened to the public in 2015, it is located near the Meridian line, which divides eastern and western hemispheres. In the garden, plants native to the Eastern Hemisphere are positioned to the east of the Meridian line, while those originating from the Western Hemisphere are placed to the west. The design and development of Crossrail Place Roof Garden have been recognised with multiple awards from both international and United Kingdom institutions. Selected notable awards include: "Best Urban Regeneration Project" at 2016 MIPIM awards in France, the first prize for the best "Innovative Design of a Contemporary Garden" at the 2017 European Garden Awards in Berlin, and a "Highly Commended" accolade at the 2016 Landscape Institute Awards in the category 'Design for a Small-Scale Development'.

Harbour Quay Garden is a garden opened in early 2022, located on Wood Wharf, featuring a boardwalk for waterside leisure. The garden also offers picnic spots and outdoor fitness equipment on the green lawn.

Harbord Square Park is the newest garden square in Wood Wharf. It is open 24/7 and offers green space available for mindfulness activities and to support nearby residents' general wellbeing.

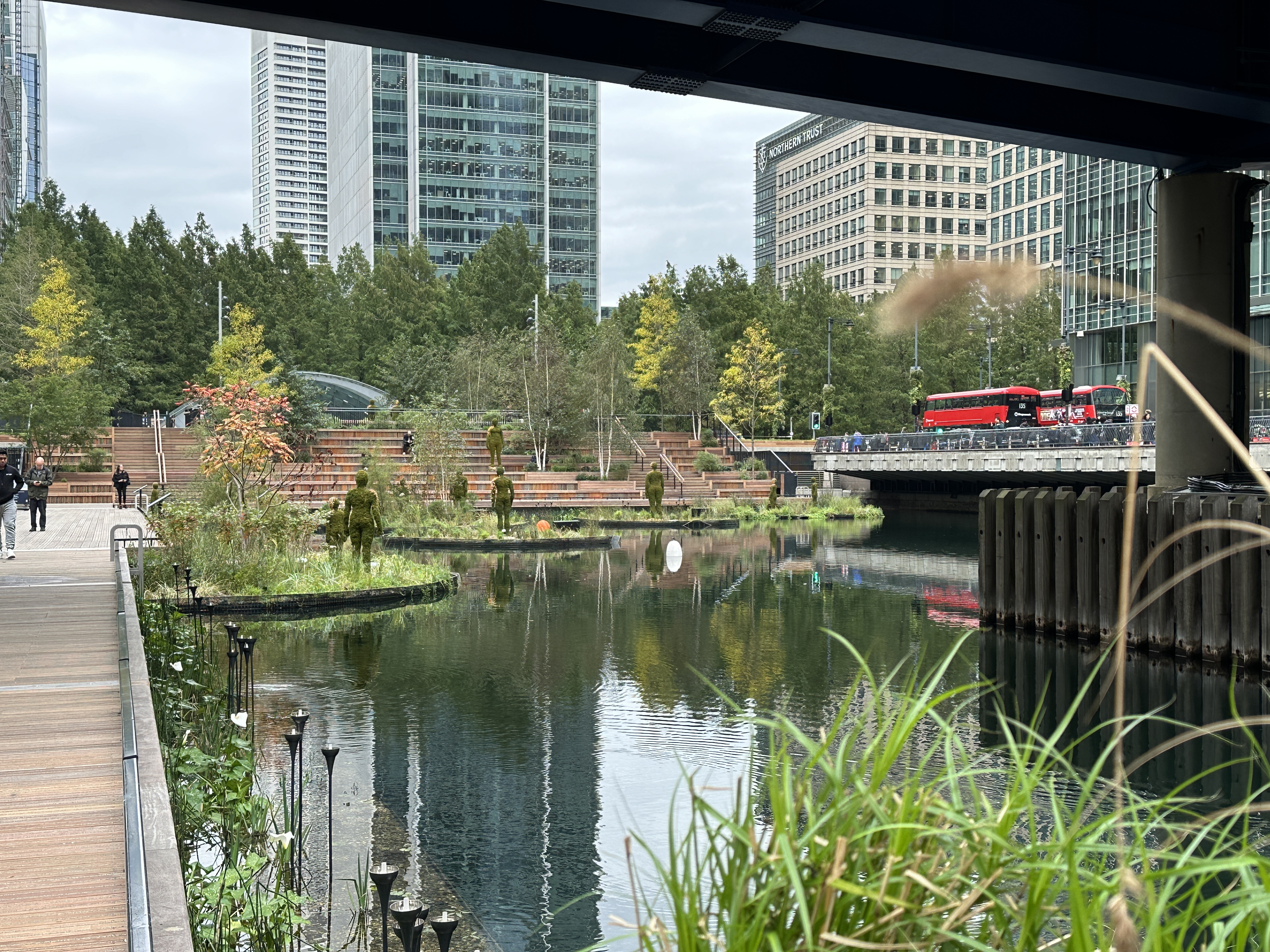
Eden Dock in the Middle Dock

Eden Dock opened in October 2024, in partnership with the Eden Project. The waterfront green space can be accessed via Jubilee Plaza or Mackenzie Walk. It includes floating islands which are designed to encourage biodiversity.

== Shopping malls ==
Canary Wharf shopping centre has five interconnected shopping malls: Canada Place, Cabot Place, Jubilee Place, Crossrail Place, and Churchill Place. The malls provide over 102,193 m^{2} (1,100,000 sq ft) of retail space with more than 310 shops. There are also bars, restaurants, and food halls at street level.

== Local government elections ==
Every four years, residents of Canary Wharf ward elect two councillors to represent them on Tower Hamlets Council.

=== 2026 results ===
Canary Wharf (2)
Party	Candidate	Votes	%	±%
Aspire	Maium Talukdar*	1,287		
Aspire	Saied Ahmed*	1,244		
Labour	Daniel Lynch	875		
Labour	Suzy Stride	810		
Green	Alexander Bishop	594		
Reform	Jon Bidwell	499		
Green	Alistair Polson	494		
Conservative	Callum Murphy	437		
Reform	Luke Williamson	422		
Conservative	Dominic Nolan	394		
Liberal Democrats	Michael Brand	207		
Liberal Democrats	Finlay Munn	158		
Tower Hamlets Independents	Zahid Hyath	133		
Tower Hamlets Independents	Mo Aboshanab	114		
Turnout			%	
Rejected ballots		24		
Aspire hold				
Aspire hold				

== Transport ==
Canary Wharf is served by London-wide, regional, national and international transport connections.

=== Rail ===
Canary Wharf is in London fare zone 2, and several stations can be found throughout the estate.

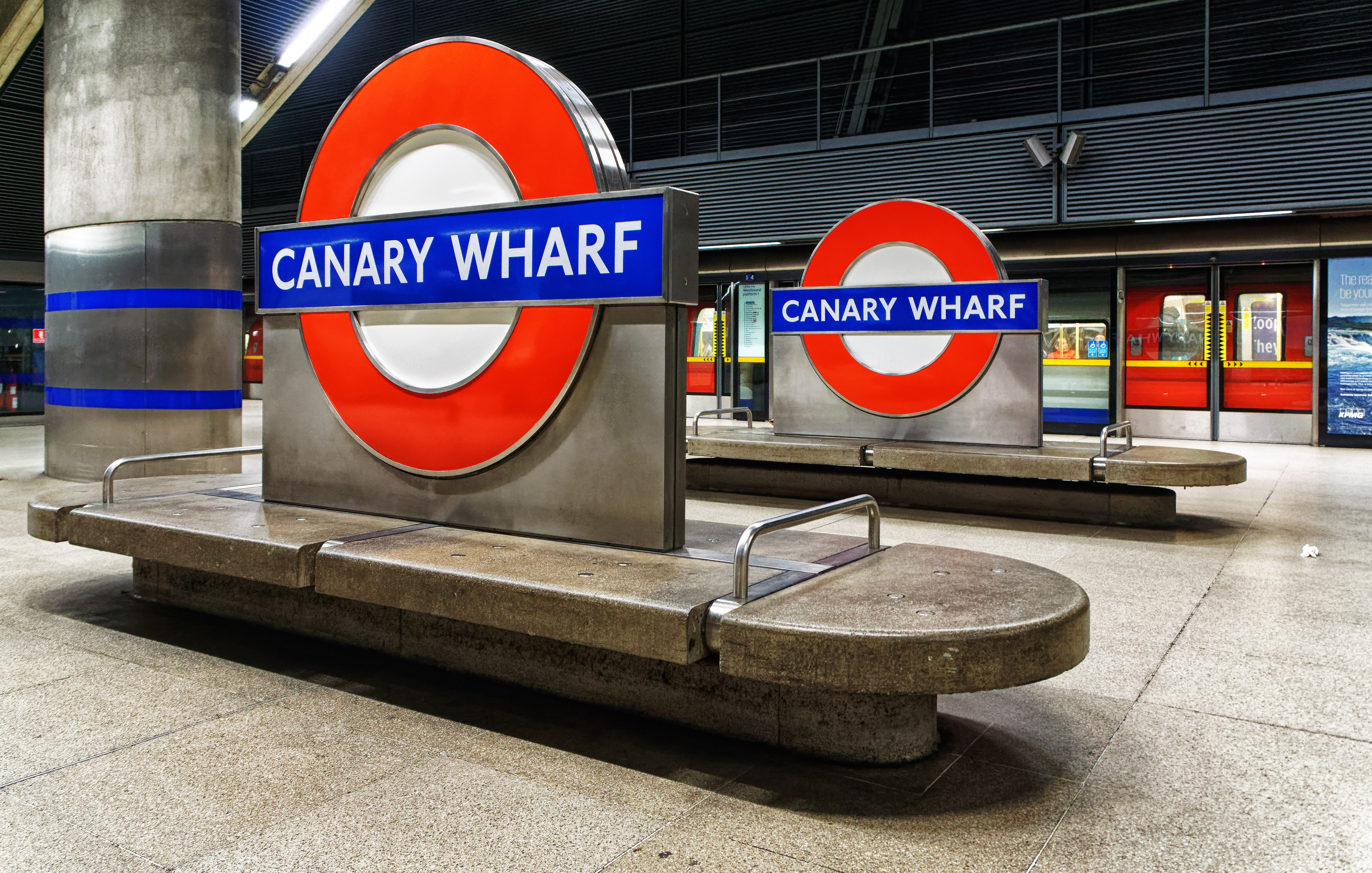
Canary Wharf tube station on the Jubilee line

- The Docklands Light Railway (DLR) calls at Canary Wharf DLR, Heron Quays DLR and West India Quay DLR stations. The line opened in 1987.
  - DLR trains link Canary Wharf northbound to Bank in the City of London, via Shadwell. Northbound trains also travel to Stratford via Poplar and Bow Church. Southbound trains terminate south of the River Thames in Lewisham, calling at Greenwich.
- London Underground Jubilee line services call at Canary Wharf tube station. Eastbound trains travel to Stratford via North Greenwich, Canning Town and West Ham. Westbound trains link Canary Wharf to the West End and key London interchanges including London Bridge, Waterloo and Baker Street. Trains towards Central London eventually terminate in North West London.
- The Elizabeth line (constructed by the Crossrail project) calls at Canary Wharf station. The line provides the area with a frequent, direct connection to the City of London and the West End. Westbound trains serve Central London and key interchanges at Liverpool Street and Paddington. Elizabeth line trains also serve Heathrow Airport and Reading, Berkshire to the west. Eastbound services terminate at Abbey Wood.

Stations in Canary Wharf only offer direct connections to London and Berkshire destinations. Regional and national National Rail connections can be found elsewhere in London, including at Liverpool Street, Lewisham, London Bridge, Stratford, Stratford International and Waterloo.

=== Road ===
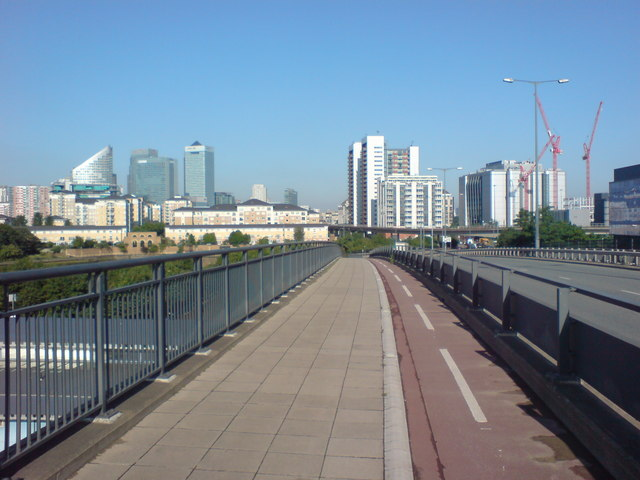
The A1026 Lower Lea Crossing, heading towards Canary Wharf. A shared use path for cycles and pedestrians also crosses the bridge.

Major roads near Canary Wharf include:

- A12 - begins in nearby Blackwall and carries traffic northeast towards Stratford, the M11 (for Stansted Airport, and destinations in Essex and East Anglia.
- A13 (East India Dock Road) - westbound to Limehouse and the City of London (Aldgate); eastbound towards Barking, the M25 and Southend.
- A102 (Blackwall Tunnel) - begins in nearby Blackwall and carries traffic southbound to Greenwich, the A2 and the A20 for destinations in Kent.
- A1026 (Lower Lea Crossing & Silvertown Tunnel) - relief for Blackwall Tunnel and carries traffic eastbound toward London City Airport via Silvertown Way.
- A1203 (Limehouse Link) - carries traffic eastbound to Shadwell and the City of London (Tower Hill).
- A1205 (Burdett Road) - carries traffic northbound to Mile End and Hackney.
- A1206 (Westferry Circus/Prestons Road) - loops around the western, southern and eastern edges of the Isle of Dogs. Links to the A1261.
- A1261 (Aspen Way) - westbound to the A13 for Limehouse and the city; eastbound to the A1020 for City Airport and the A13 towards Barking.

==== Air pollution ====
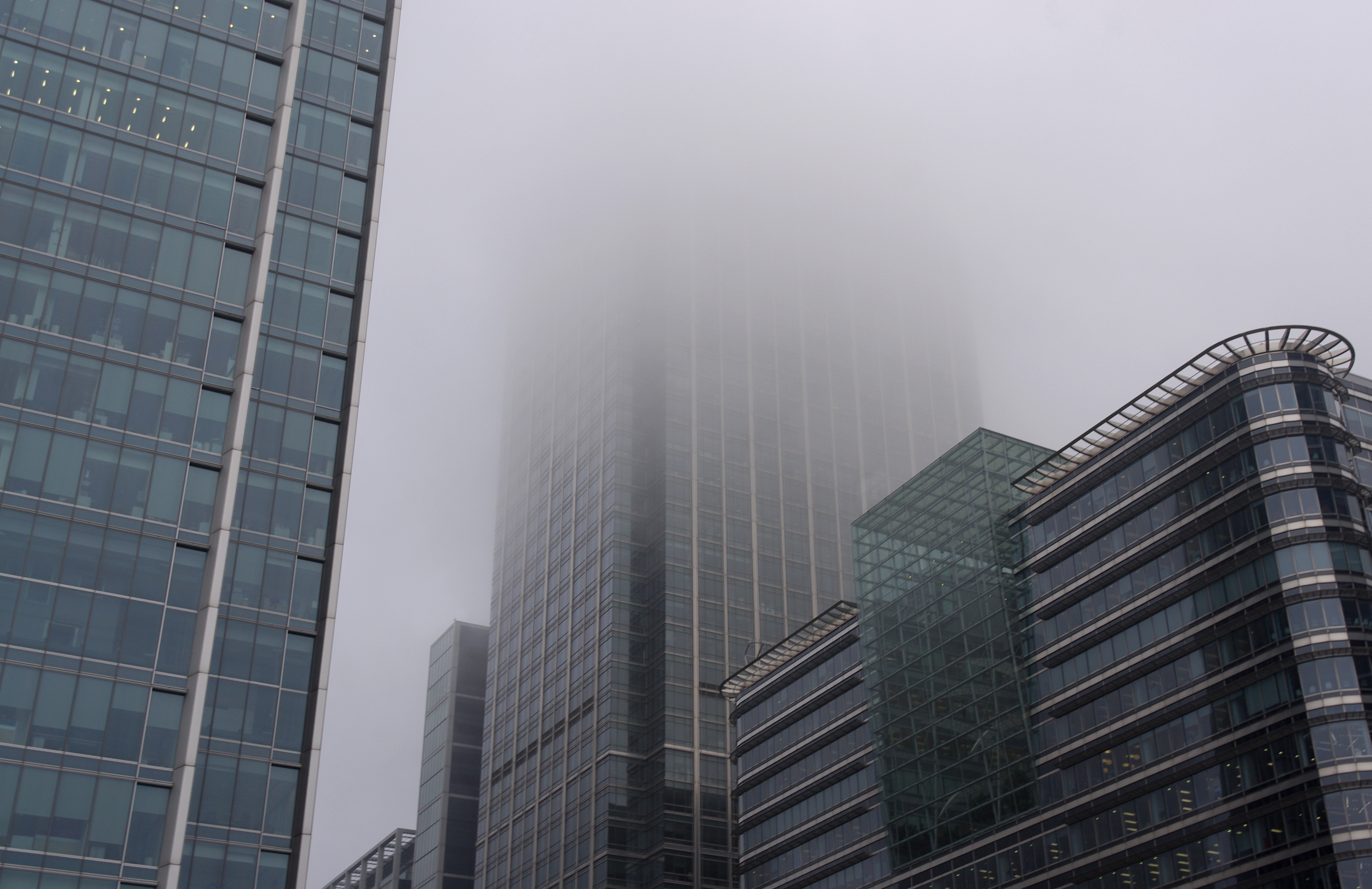
Low cloud and fog at Canary Wharf

Transport for London (TfL) and the London Borough of Tower Hamlets monitor the air quality around Canary Wharf.

In 2017, an automatic monitoring station in Blackwall found that local air quality failed to meet UK National Air Quality Objectives, recording an annual average nitrogen dioxide (NO_{2}) concentration of 56 μg/m3 (micrograms per cubic metre). The national objective is set by the government at 40 μg/m3.

Alternative stations nearer Canary Wharf recorded cleaner air. Monitors at the Limehouse Link/Westferry Road junction and on Prestons Road recorded a 2017 annual average NO_{2} concentration of 40 μg/m3, which Tower Hamlets argue fails to meet the UK National Objective.

=== Buses ===
London Buses routes 135, 277, D3, D7, D8, N277, N550 and SL4 call at bus stops near Canary Wharf. Bus 135 links Canary Wharf directly to Liverpool Street in the City of London, and bus D8 to Stratford.

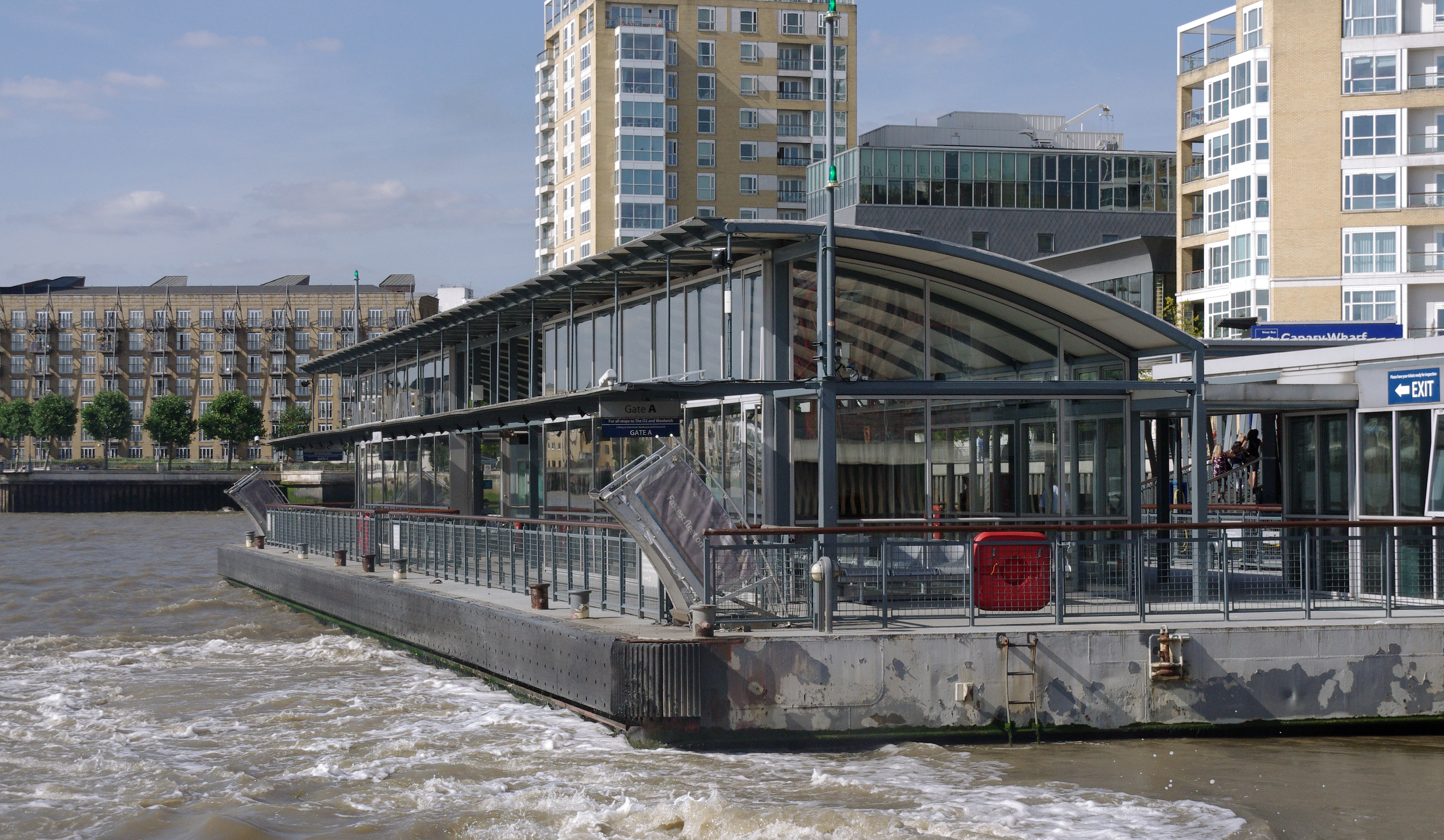
Canary Wharf Pier

=== Riverboat ===
Several Riverboat services call at Canary Wharf Pier, including:

- RB1 - eastbound to North Greenwich and Woolwich Arsenal Pier; westbound to Tower, London Bridge City, Bankside, Blackfriars, Embankment, the London Eye and Westminster.
- RB1X - eastbound to North Greenwich and Royal Wharf Pier; westbound to Tower, London Bridge City, Bankside, Embankment, the London Eye and Westminster (limited service to Battersea Power Station).
- RB4 - the Canary Wharf – Rotherhithe Ferry crosses the Thames to Nelson Dock.
- RB6 - limited eastbound service towards Putney.

Tower, London Bridge City and Blackfriars are in the City of London. Oyster Cards are valid for travel on TfL-coordinated riverboat services.

=== Airports ===
London City Airport is 3 miles (4.8 km) from Canary Wharf. Over 4.8 million passengers passed through City Airport in 2018. The airport serves domestic and international destinations.

London City Airport is on the DLR train line. Passengers from Canary Wharf can change trains at Poplar for services to the Airport.

=== Cycling ===
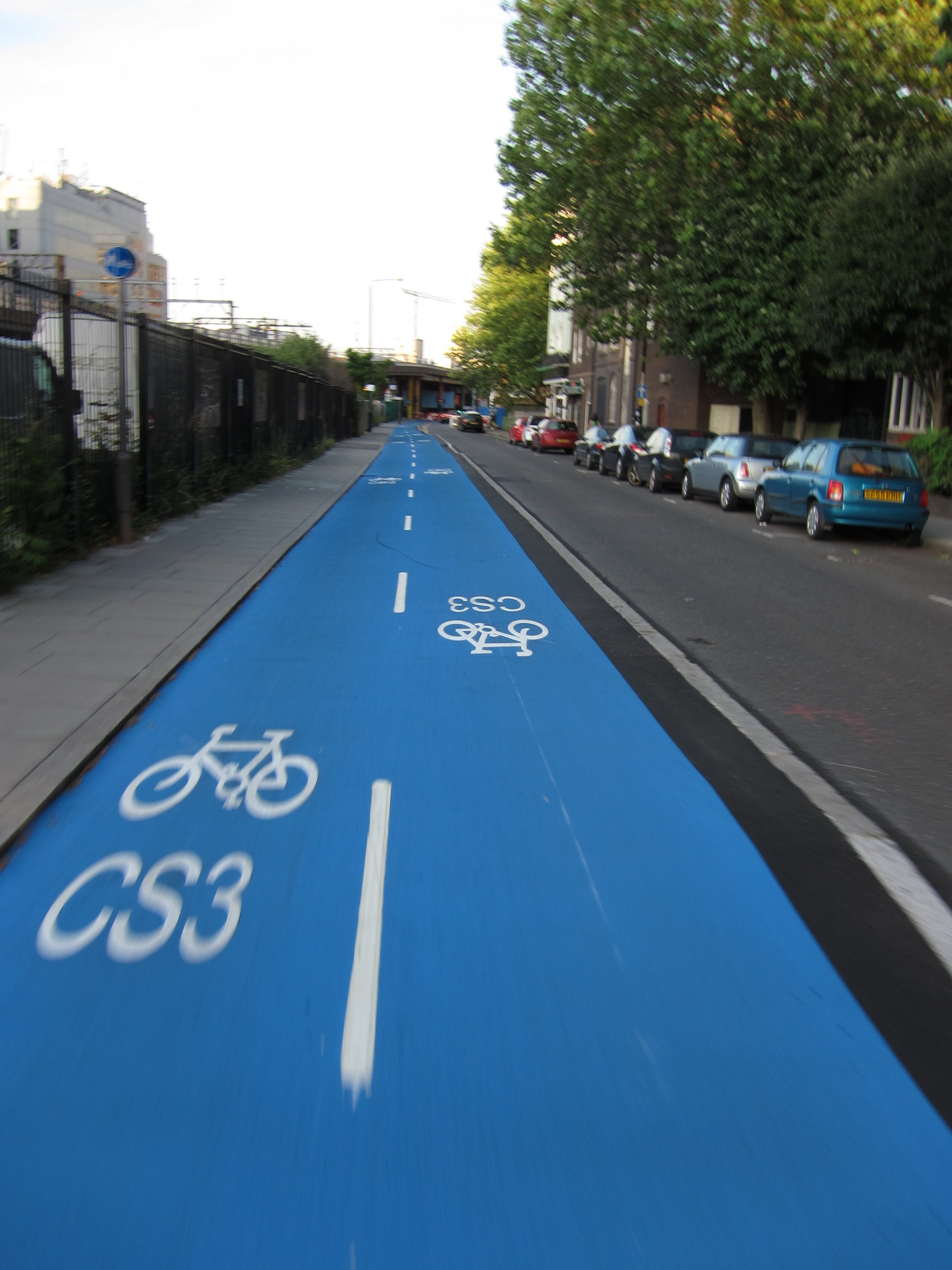
Cycle Superhighway 3 passes to the north of Canary Wharf and links the estate to the City of London, Westminster and Hyde Park on a predominantly traffic-free route.

The Canary Wharf Group, London Borough of Tower Hamlets and Transport for London (TfL) provide cycling infrastructure in and around Canary Wharf. Several leisure and commuter routes pass through or near the estate, including:

- National Cycle Route 1 (NCR 1) - a leisure cycle route from Dover to Shetland. The route is indirect, running through London on low-traffic paths. In North London, the route runs from the Greenwich foot tunnel to Enfield Lock via Canary Wharf, Mile End and Tottenham. The route runs to the west of Canary Wharf, parallel to the River Thames.
- EuroVelo 2 ("The Capitals Route") - an international leisure cycle route from Moscow, Russia to Galway, Ireland. In North London, EV2 follows the route of NCR 1.
- National Cycle Route 13 (NCR 13) - a leisure cycle route from the city to Fakenham, Norfolk. The route is indirect, running through East London on low-traffic paths. The route leaves London near Rainham.
- Cycle Superhighway 3 (CS3) - a commuter cycle route from Barking to West London. The route runs east–west through nearby Poplar on low-traffic or residential streets. The route is signposted and unbroken.
- Cycleway from Hackney to the Isle of Dogs - proposed cycle link which would link Canary Wharf directly to Mile End on traffic-free cycle track.
- Limehouse Cut towpath - shared-use path from nearby Limehouse to Stratford. The route is traffic-free.
- Regent's Canal towpath - shared-use path from nearby Limehouse to Angel. The route is traffic-free and passes through Mile End, Haggerston, and Islington.

== Museums and archives ==
Opened in a Grade I listed Georgian warehouse by Queen Elizabeth II in June 2003, the Museum of London Docklands is one of the main attractions in the area. It is dedicated to the history of London's river, port, and people from Roman settlement to the present day. The museum offers a range of activities for children and families, including interactive displays and immersive activities.

== Pokémon Go ==
Canary Wharf has been reported since 2017 as part of the Pokémon Go augmented reality game to being the home for the most wanted Pokémon gyms in London including Canary Wharf DLR station and Montgomery Square.

Canary Wharf Group published an official Pokémon map for PokéStops and Pokémon Gyms, the managing director for retail Camille Waxer said in 2016 that Pokémon Go has serious potential to attract new audiences to the area, particularly food and drink outlets which saw an increase in foot traffic.

== Events and festivals ==
=== Winter Lights Festival ===
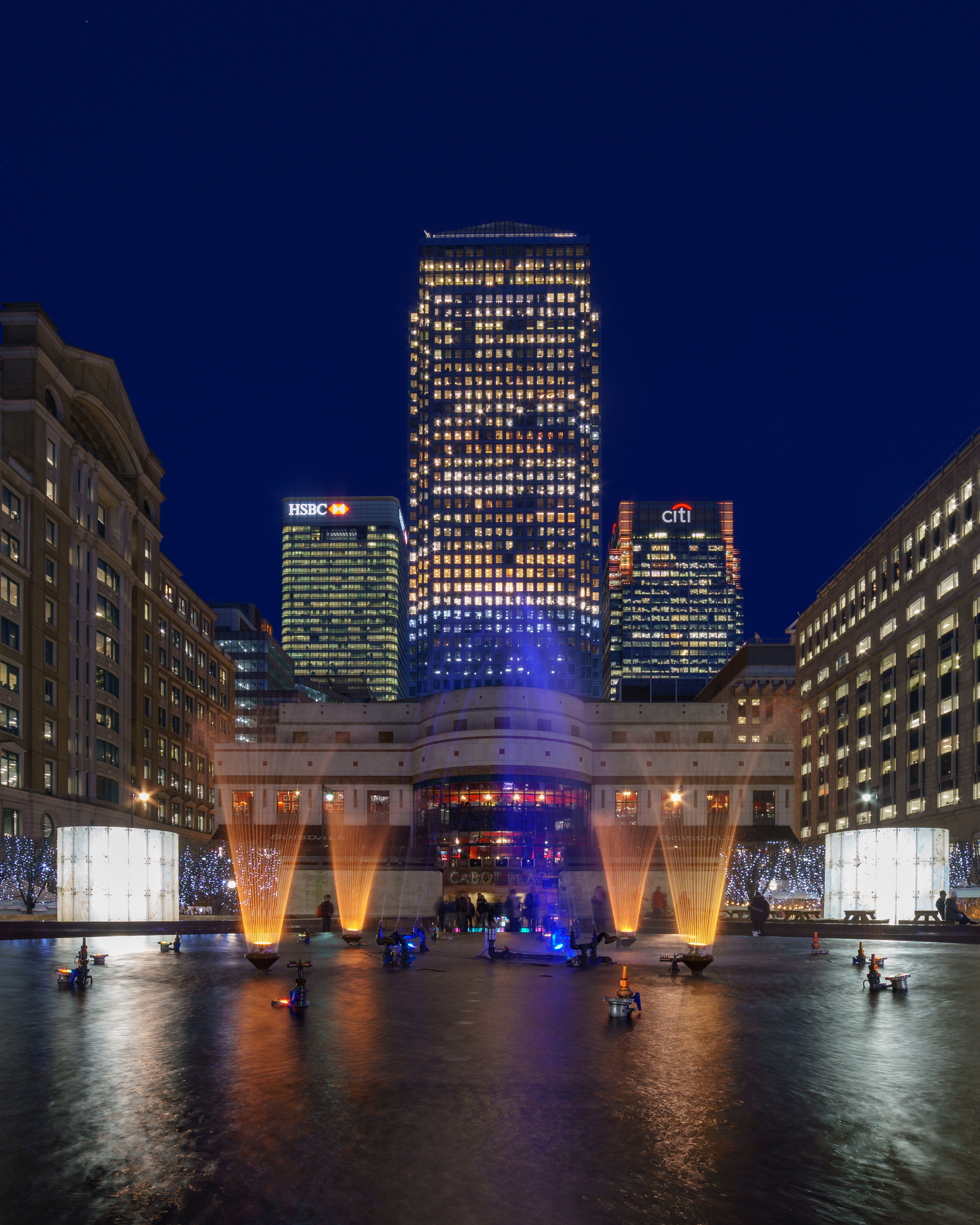
Cabot Square during the Winter Lights Festival, 17 January 2019

Incepted in 2014, the Canary Wharf Winter Lights Festival turns on in January every year. The public are free to visit a range of outdoor light, art and interactive installations created by artists from around the world. The festival was awarded the Best Creative Lighting Event award by the [d]arc awards in 2017 and 2019. The 2023 Canary Wharf Winter Lights Festival was described as the largest light art festival in London.

=== WaterAid Dragon Boat Race ===
The event is organised annually by WaterAid, an international charity, in collaboration with the Canary Wharf Group. The funds raised through this event are used to combat the escalating water crisis that leaves people globally unable to access clean water and without a basic toilet. The Dragon Boat Race, based on a Chinese tradition dating back over 2,000 years, takes place in South Dock of Canary Wharf on summer, and is open to corporate teams of between 11 and 17 participants. In 2022, 15 teams participated in the race, and the event raised £26,000. With 19 teams taking place in the 2023 race, the raised funds was increased to £31,744.

=== Festival14 ===
Hosted by the Canary Wharf Group, the festival was a four-day event from 21 to 24 July 2022. It hosted over 60 live acts including music, theatre, dance, poetry, and children's activities throughout the estate. The majority of acts were free to attend, and the event transformed the estate's numerous parks, plazas, and open spaces as they hosted a line-up of artists and performers from across the world. The second year of Festival14 was extended to a five-day event in July 2023.

=== Open water swimming ===
Canary Wharf has partnered with Love Open Water to launch its first outdoor swimming since summer 2022. The venue, located in the 220-year-old Middle Dock, offers 600 m^{2} (6,500 sq ft) of open water swimming.

== Outdoor public art ==
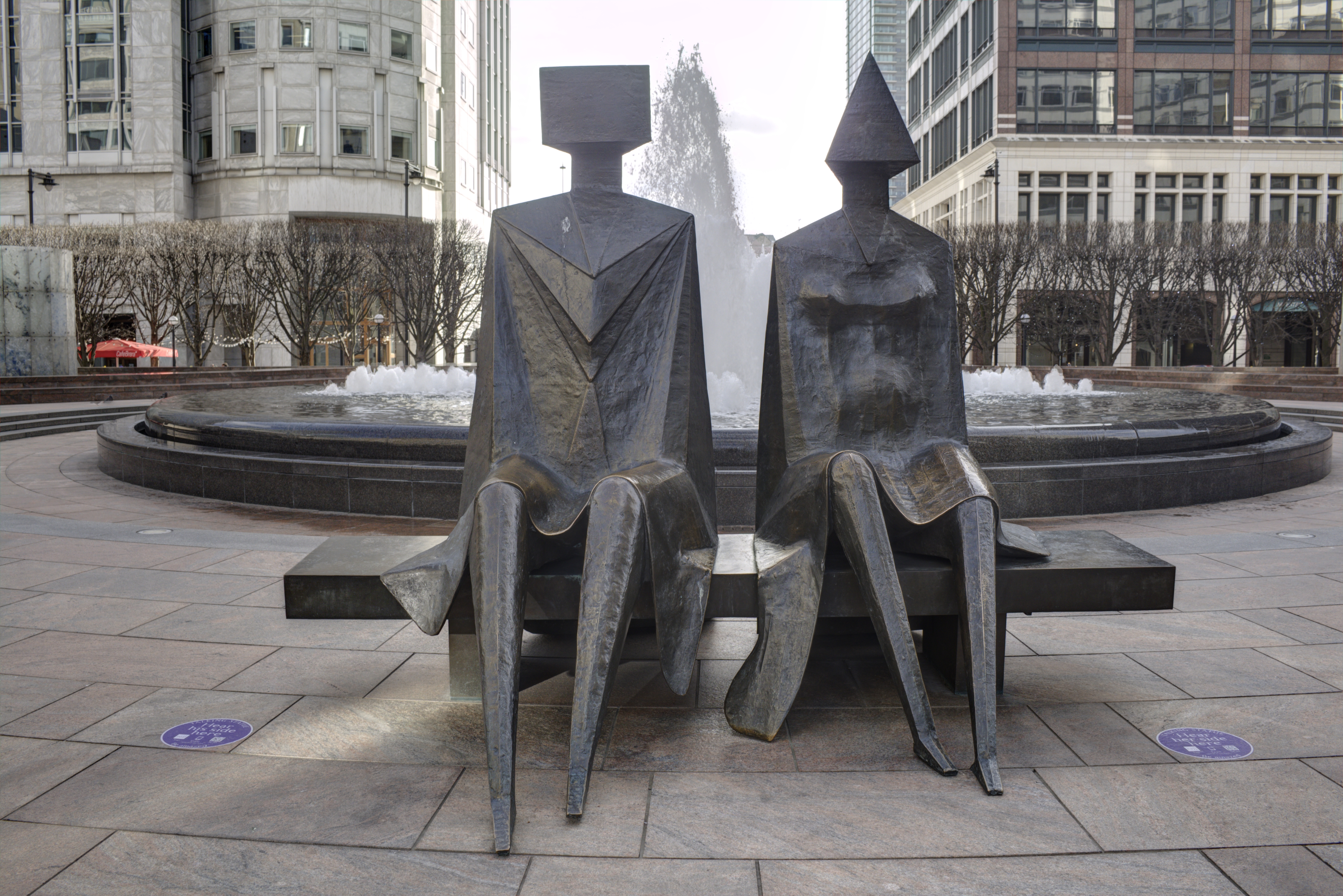
Couple on Seat by Lynn Chadwick, located at Cabot Square, Canary Wharf

The Canary Wharf Art Trail is the largest outdoor public art collection in London. People are free to visit more than 100 pieces of stand-alone sculptures, integrated architectural works, and outdoor art exhibiting outside buildings around the Canary Wharf area. Two printed maps are regularly updated by the Canary Wharf Group for visitors to discover and identify artworks permanently on display all over the estate.

- Canary Wharf Art Map: over 100 pieces of artworks, with a brief description, are numbered sequentially as to their exhibition locations at Canary Wharf.
- Children's Art Trail: a smaller trail of 12 sculptures and artworks for children.

The Canary Wharf website provides information about Raise Your Art Rate, an ongoing event that allows visitors to explore the outdoor public art collection while exercising. The event offers 1, 3, and 5 km walking, jogging or running routes that traverse the artworks. The routes are tailored to showcase the over 100 artworks on display throughout the estate. The event is free and open to all visitors.

== Media ==
The East London Advertiser (formerly The Docklands & East London Advertiser) is a local newspaper printing weekly and also online.

Wharf Life is a fortnightly publication of 15,000 copies for Canary Wharf, Docklands and east London. An E-edition is also available.

== See also ==
- Dublin quays
- 1996 Docklands bombing
- The Wharf newspaper
- List of tallest buildings and structures in London
