= 25 Churchill Place =

Skyscraper in East London

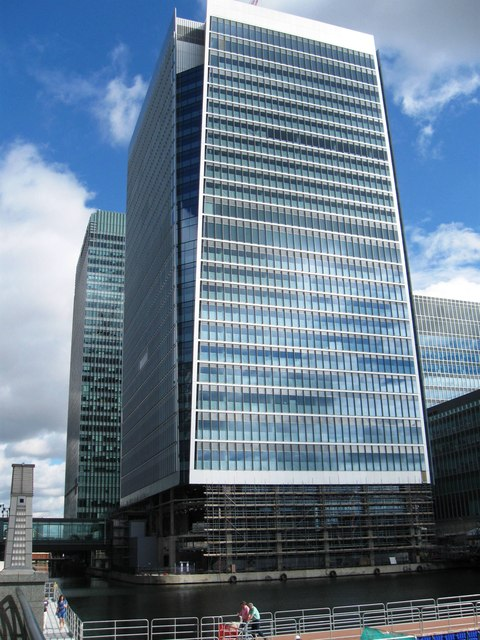
- 25 Churchill Place in August 2013
- Interactive map of the 25 Churchill Place area

General information
- Status: Completed
- Architectural style: Modern
- Location: 25 Churchill Place, Canary Wharf, London, England
- Coordinates: 51.5037983°N 0.0148581°W
- Construction started: 2012
- Completed: 2014
- Opened: 2014

Height
- Tip: 118 metres (387 ft)
- Roof: 118 metres (387 ft)

Technical details
- Material: Composite: * Reinforced concrete * Steel
- Floor count: 23
- Floor area: 89,800 square metres (967,000 ft^{2})

Design and construction
- Architect: Kohn Pedersen Fox
- Developer: Canary Wharf Group
- Main contractor: Canary Wharf Contractors

Website
- http://25churchillplace.com/

25 Churchill Place is a 118 metres (387 ft) tall skyscraper in the eastern part of the London financial district Canary Wharf. It was built in 2014 and has 23 storeys. The building was developed by Canary Wharf Group and designed by Kohn Pedersen Fox.

== History ==
=== Planning ===
Canary Wharf Group applied to Tower Hamlets for planning permission to construct a 23-storey building at 25 Churchill Place, E14 in April 2008. Permission was granted in November 2008.

25 Churchill Place was planned to be an energy-efficient and sustainable office building. The Environmental features would include lifts that could store and reuse the energy elsewhere in the building. It also planned to has 19 storeys of grade A office space. The building was designed by architects Kohn Pedersen Fox who also designed The Pinnacle (London) in the City of London Financial District and will be developed by Canary Wharf Group.

=== Construction ===
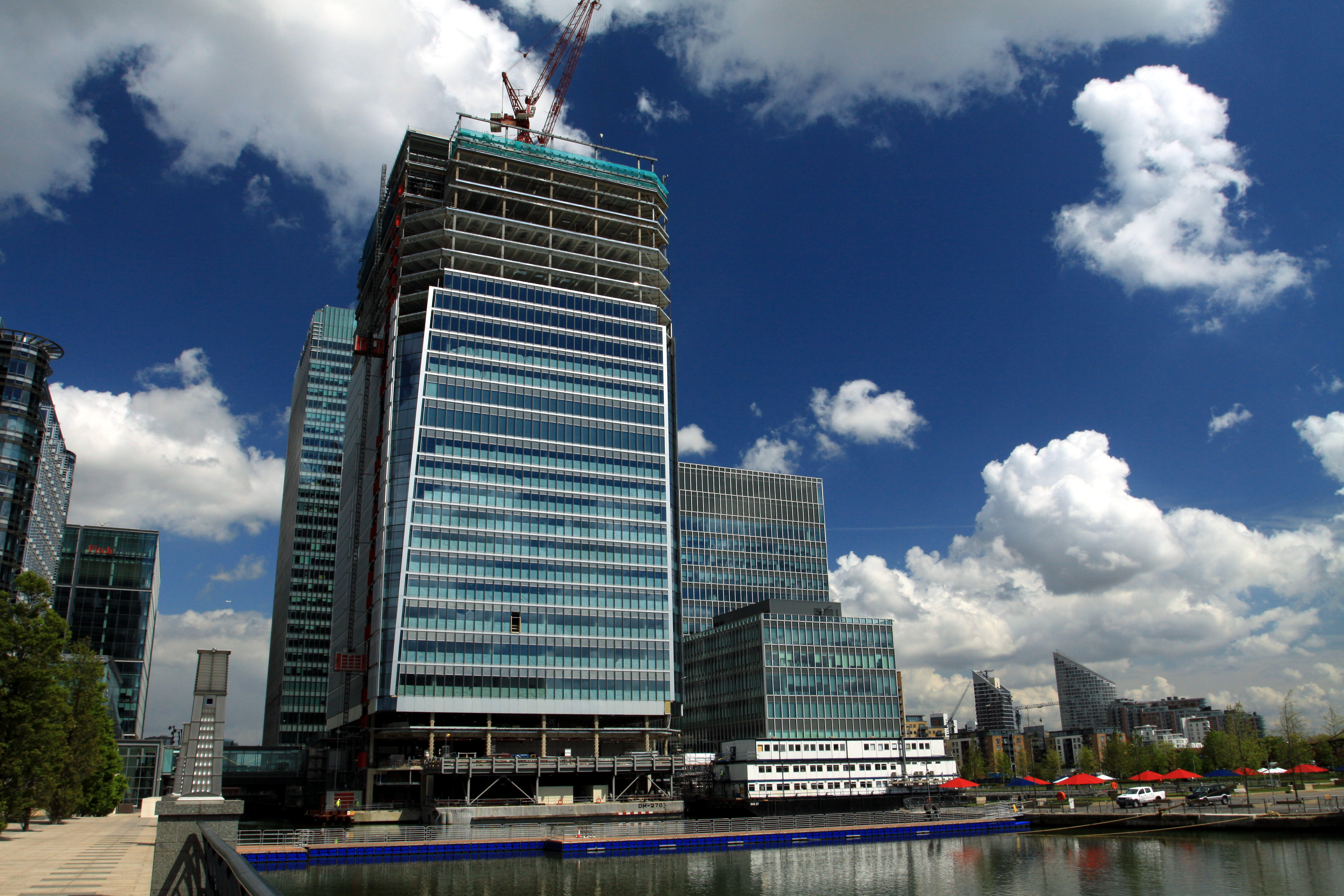
Construction in May 2013

Construction began on the 23-storey tower in February 2012 with Canary Wharf Contractors Limited as the main building contractor. On 7 February 2013, the installation of the final section of the steel frame marks the completion of the building and had reached a major milestone. It was completed and opened in 2014 with a height of 118 metres (387 ft).

== Tenants ==
25 Churchill Place has been used by some notable companies and organizations as their headquarters. It houses Ernst & Young since 2015, who have taken floors 11–21. The European Medicines Agency (EMA) took floors 1–10 in 2014, however due to Brexit the EMA has now relocated to Amsterdam, Netherlands, with US company Wework subletting the space as well as floors 11 and 13.

== See also ==
- One Churchill Place
- City of London § Landmarks
- Canary Wharf
- One Canada Square
- List of tallest buildings and structures in London
