= Jubilee Park =

Jubilee Park may refer to:

- Jubilee Park, Mackay, Queensland, Australia
- A public park and light rail station in Sydney, Australia
- Jubilee Park, Melbourne, a cricket stadium in Victoria, Australia; see 2017–18 Women's National Cricket League season
- Cinquantenaire, also known as Jubelpark ("Jubilee Park"), in Brussels, Belgium
- A public park in Woodhall Spa, Lincolnshire, England
- A public park above the Canary Wharf tube station in London, England
- A public park in the London Borough of Enfield, England
- Leyton Jubilee Park, London, England
- Jubilee Park, Jamshedpur, a public park in Tatanagar, India
- Jubilee Park, a public park in Normandale, New Zealand
- A play area in Glynn, Northern Ireland
- An outdoor play area in Fort Canning Park, Singapore
- Jubilee Park, Dallas, a neighborhood in Dallas, Texas, United States

== See also ==
- Sultan Haji Hassanal Bolkiah Silver Jubilee Park, Bandar Seri Begawan, Brunei
- Jubilee Parkway, Mobile, Alabama
