= Newfoundland, London =

Residential skyscraper on the Isle of Dogs, London

Newfoundland
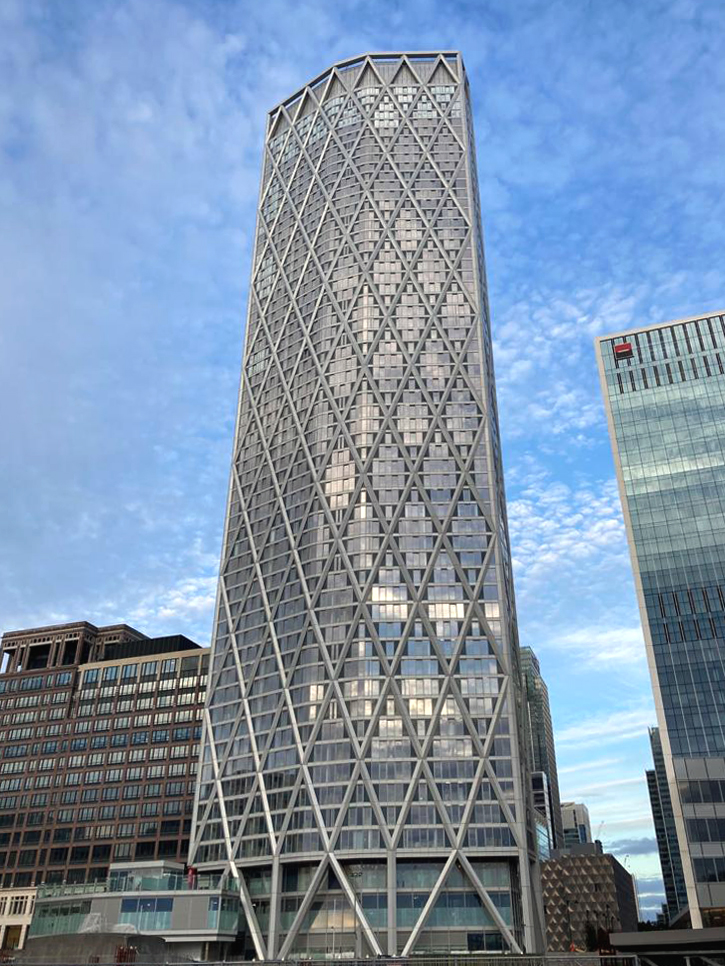
- Newfoundland site
- Interactive map of the Newfoundland area

General information
- Status: Completed
- Type: Residential
- Location: London, E14 4BJ; United Kingdom
- Coordinates: 51°30′15.5″N 0°1′30.3″W
- Construction started: 2015
- Completed: 2021
- Client: South Quays Properties, Ltd.

Height
- Height: 220 m (720 ft)

Technical details
- Floor count: 58
- Floor area: 66,982 m^{2} (720,990 sq ft)

Design and construction
- Architecture firm: Horden Cherry Lee; Adamson Associates (International) Ltd. as executive architect
- Structural engineer: WSP Global
- Services engineer: Hoare Lea
- Main contractor: Canary Wharf Contractors

Website
- newfoundland

The Newfoundland is a 220-metre (720 ft) residential skyscraper located between Westferry Road and Bank Street in Canary Wharf on the Isle of Dogs, London.

South Quay Properties, Ltd., a subsidiary of Canary Wharf Group, submitted a planning application to Tower Hamlets Borough Council in June 2013 for the erection of a 58-storey and linked 2-storey building for residential use, along with some retail uses and car parking at a location bounded by Park Place, Westferry Road and Heron Quay Road. Newfoundland was designed by architects Horden Cherry Lee and structural engineers WSP Global. The building was opened for rent in May 2021.

Newfoundland is sometimes referred to as 'the diamond tower' due to the diamond-pattern steel exoskeleton that structurally supports it. The tower stands at 220 metres tall, making it the tallest build-to-rent building in the United Kingdom. It is also the first residential building ever built on the Canary Wharf private estate, which makes it stand out among the financial center's commercial towers. Its prominent location, on the banks of the river Thames and at the end of Middle Dock, West India Docks, is directly opposite the main exit of Canary Wharf Jubilee line station and can be seen across the dock from there.

== Awards and Accreditation ==
- Winner of the Residential High Rise Development category at the 2021 International Property Awards.
- Awarded Best Exterior Design (Silver) and Best Build to Rent Project (Bronze) at 2021 WhatHouse? Awards.

== Gallery ==
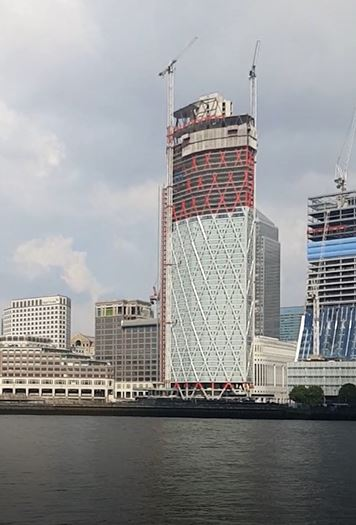
Newfoundland site, May 2018

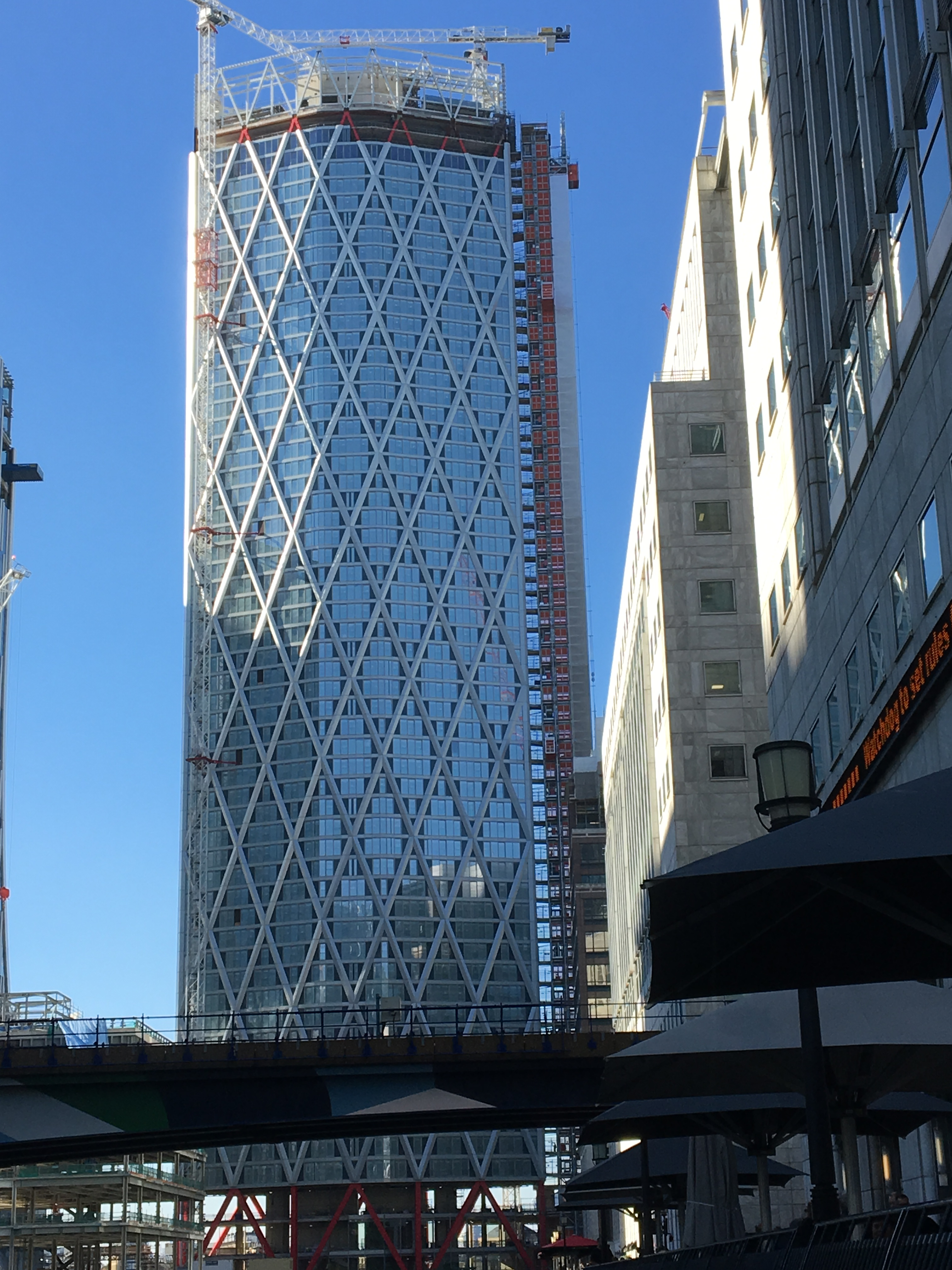
Newfoundland site, October 2018

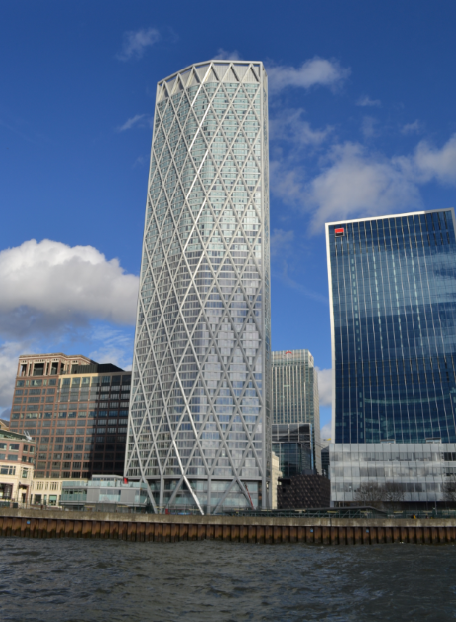
Newfoundland site, March 2020

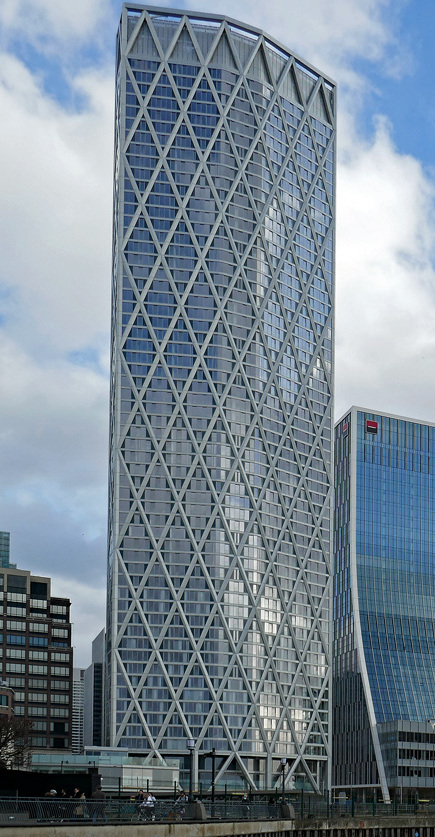
Newfoundland, November 2020
