= 40 Marsh Wall =

Novotel London Canary Wharf
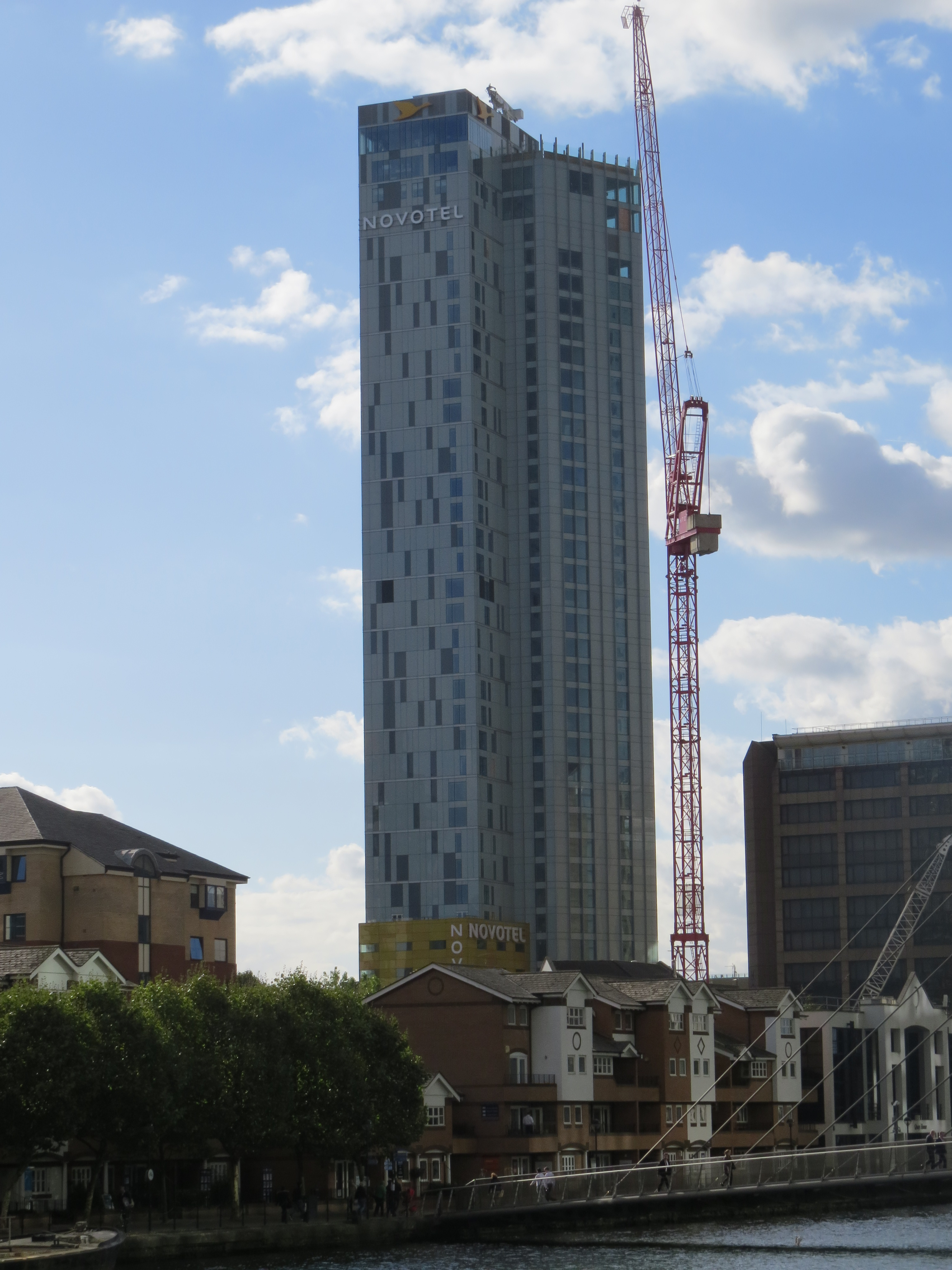
- The hotel while still under construction.
- Interactive map of the Novotel London Canary Wharf area

General information
- Status: Completed
- Type: Hotel
- Location: Canary Wharf, London, E14; United Kingdom, 40 Marsh Wall, London, United Kingdom
- Coordinates: 51.50117°N 0.023261°W
- Owner: AccorHotels

Height
- Roof: 127.65 m (419 ft)

Technical details
- Floor count: 39

Design and construction
- Architect: BUJ Architects

Other information
- Number of rooms: 313

Novotel London Canary Wharf also known as 40 Marsh Wall is a 127 m (419 ft), 39-storey hotel in the Isle of Dogs, London, just south of the financial district of Canary Wharf. It was designed by BUJ Architects for AccorHotels as one of the company's Novotel hotels and has 313 rooms. It is the tallest all-hotel building in the United Kingdom and the tallest Novotel in the world.

Construction began in July 2014, costing an estimated £60 million.

Planning permission was granted for the hotel in November 2010 by Tower Hamlets Council. It replaces an office building of six-storeys and 43,768 sq ft which was formerly on the site.

== Gallery ==
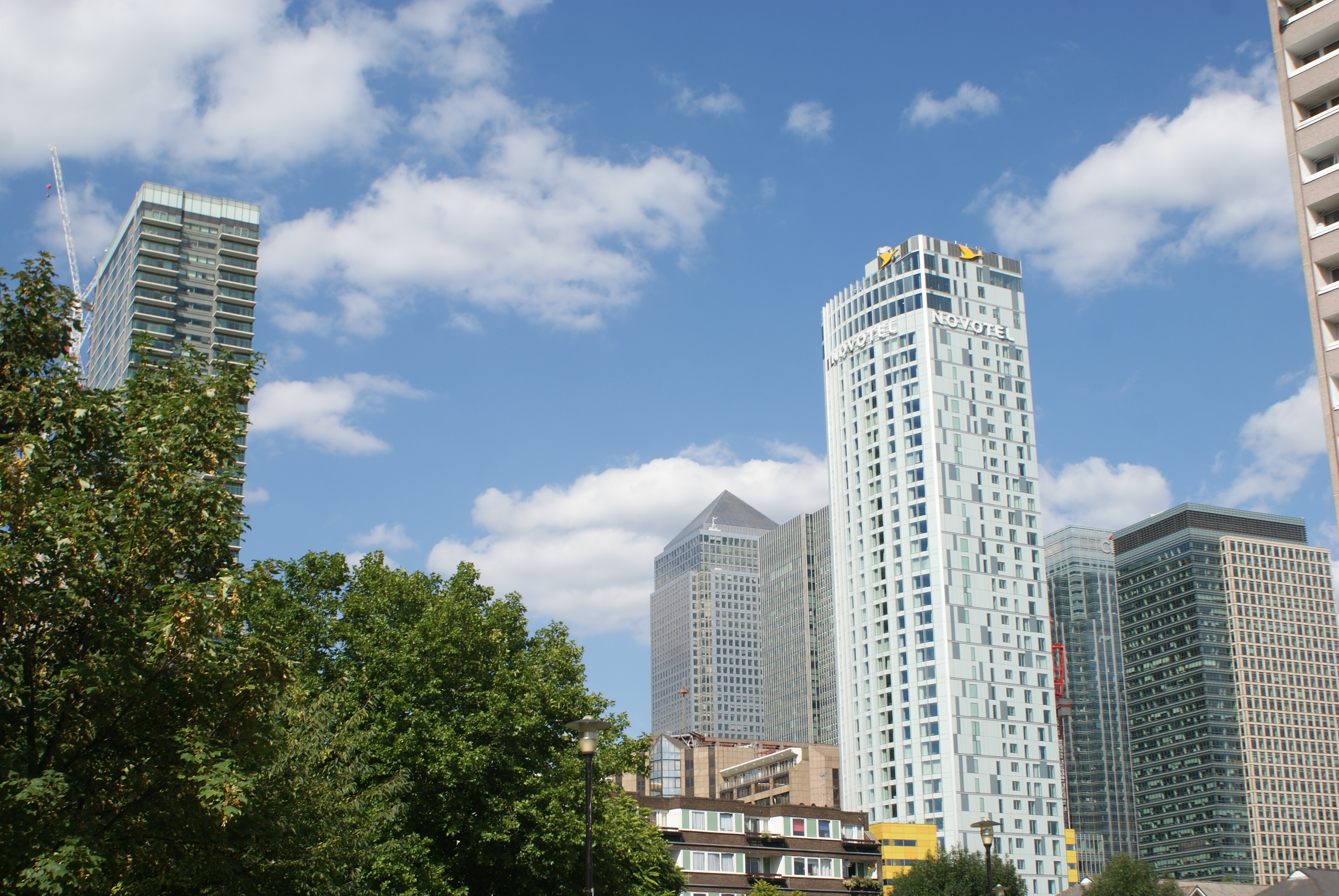
View of Canary Wharf and the Hotel Novotel Canary Wharf from Westferry Road

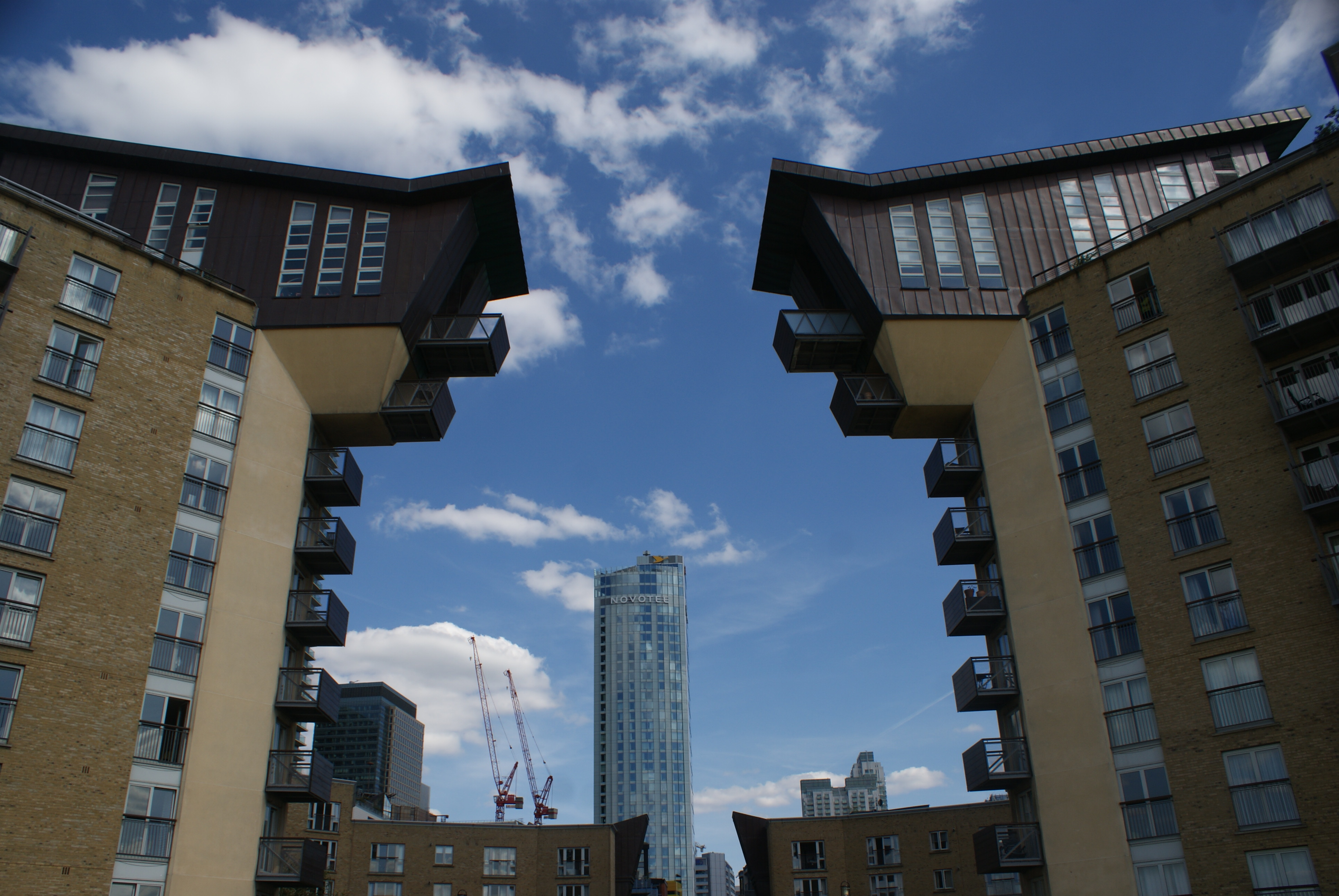
View of the Hotel Novotel Canary Wharf from the Thames Path

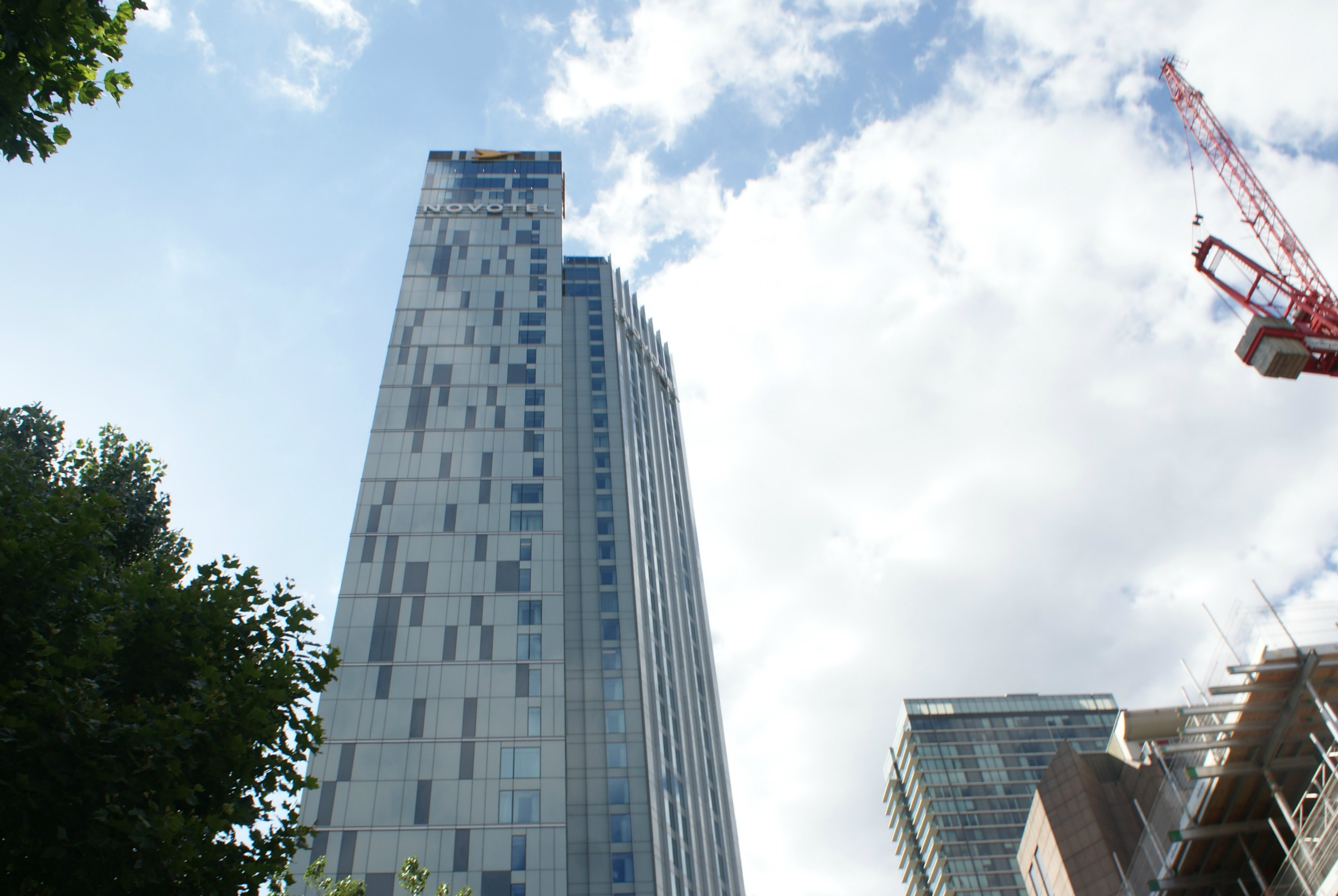
View of Hotel Novotel Canary Wharf from Admirals Way

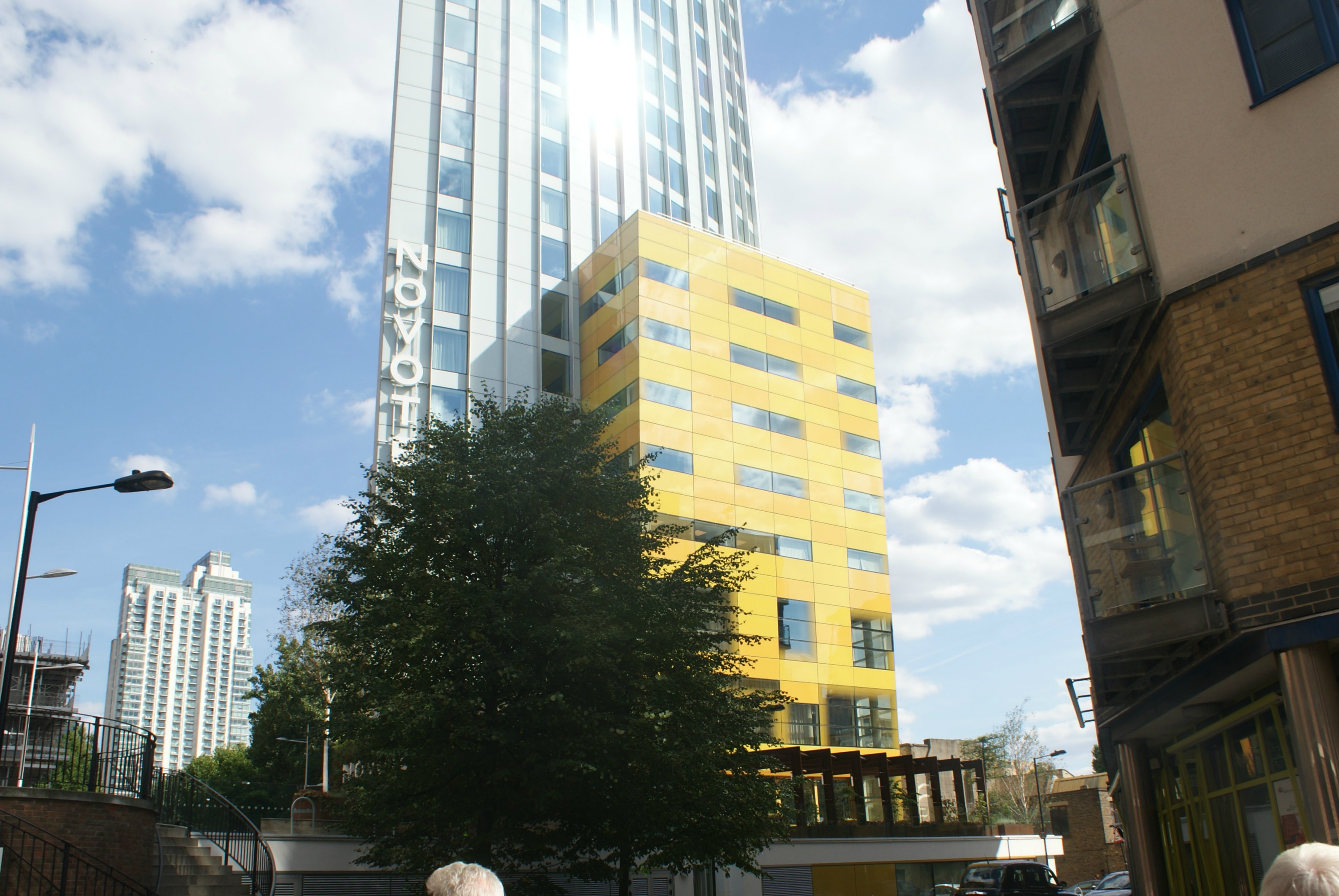
Street level view of Hotel Novotel from Cuba Street

== See also ==
Hotels in London
List of tallest buildings and structures in London
List of tallest buildings and structures in the United Kingdom
