= List of structures in London =

This is a list of notable buildings, complexes and monuments in London.

== 0-9 ==
- 2 Willow Road
- 2 Marsham Street
- 6 Burlington Gardens
- 6 Ellerdale Road
- 10 Downing Street
- 10 Palace Gate
- 10 Upper Bank Street
- 11 Downing Street
- 12 Downing Street
- 25 Bank Street
- 40 Bank Street
- 48 Doughty Street
- 50 Queen Anne's Gate
- 55 Broadway
- 71 Fenchurch St
- 221B Baker Street
- 89 Albert Embankment

== A ==
- Abbey Mills Pumping Stations
- Abney Park Cemetery
- Abney Park Chapel
- Addington Palace
- Adelphi Buildings
- Adelphi Theatre
- Admiralty
- Admiralty Arch
- The Albany
- Albemarle Club
- Albert Bridge
- Albert Embankment
- Albert Memorial
- Aldwych Theatre
- Alexandra Palace
- All England Lawn Tennis and Croquet Club (Wimbledon)
- All Hallows-by-the-Tower
- All Hallows-on-the-Wall
- All Hallows Staining
- All Saints, Camden Town
- All Saints, Margaret Street
- All Saints' Church, Edmonton
- All Saints Church, Fulham
- All Saints Church, Kingston upon Thames
- All Saints Church, Peckham
- All Souls Church, Langham Place
- Almeida Theatre
- Ambassadors Theatre
- Apollo Theatre
- Apollo Victoria Theatre
- Apsley House
- Aquatics Centre (London)
- Archway (London)
- Army and Navy Club
- Arnos Grove tube station
- Arsenal Stadium
- The Arts Club
- Arundel House
- Ashburnham House
- Ashby's Mill
- Athenaeum Club
- Australia House
- Aviva Tower

== B ==
- Baden-Powell House
- Baitul Futuh Mosque
- Baker Street tube station
- Balfron Tower
- Bank of England
- Bankside Power Station (Tate Modern)
- Banqueting House at Whitehall
- Barbados High Commission in London
- Barbican Centre
- Barbican Estate
- Barking Abbey
- Barking Park
- Barnes Railway Bridge
- Barnet Gate Mill
- Battersea Bridge
- Battersea Park
- Battersea Power Station
- Battersea Railway Bridge
- Bedford Park
- Bedford Square
- Belgrave Square
- Belmarsh (HM Prison)
- Benjamin Franklin House
- Bentley Priory Museum
- The Berkeley
- Berkeley Square
- Bethlem Royal Hospital
- Bevis Marks Synagogue
- Big Ben
- Billingsgate Fish Market
- Birkbeck, University of London
- Bishopsgate Institute
- Blackfriars Bridge
- Blackfriars Railway Bridge
- Blackfriars station
- Blackwall Tunnel
- Boodle's
- Bloomsbury Square
- Borough Market
- Boston Manor House
- Bow Quarter
- Bow Street Magistrates' Court
- Brent Cross
- Brick Lane Mosque
- BBC Television Centre
- British Dental Association
- British Medical Association
- British Museum
- British Optical Association
- British Library
- Brixton (HM Prison)
- Broadcasting House
- Broadgate
- Brockwell Park
- Bromley Hall
- Brompton Cemetery
- Brookmans Park Transmitter
- Brooks's
- Broomfield Park, Palmers Green
- Bruce Castle
- Brunel Engine House
- Brunel University
- Brunswick Centre
- Buckingham Palace
- Burlington Arcade
- Burlington House
- Business Design Centre
- BT Tower (Post Office Tower/Telecom Tower)
- Bunhill Fields
- Bush House
- Bushy Park
- Butler's Wharf
- Buxton Memorial Fountain

== C ==
- Cabinet Office
- Cadogan Hall
- Cambridge Circus
- Cambridge House
- Camden Arts Centre
- Camden Market
- Canada House
- Canal Museum
- Canary Wharf
- Cannon Street Railway Bridge
- Cannon Street station
- Canons Park
- Carling Academy Brixton
- Carlton Club
- Carlton House
- Carlton House Terrace
- Carlyle's House
- Cavalry Barracks, Hounslow
- Cenotaph
- Central Synagogue, Great Portland Street
- Centre Point
- Channel Four Television Corporation
- Charing Cross
- Charing Cross Hospital
- Charing Cross railway station
- Charles Dickens Museum
- Charlton House
- Charterhouse Square
- Chatham House
- Chelsea Barracks
- Chelsea Bridge
- Chelsea Embankment
- Chelsea Harbour
- Chelsea Old Church (All Saints)
- Chelsea Physic Garden
- Chessington Hall
- Chester Terrace
- Chiswick Bridge
- Chiswick House
- Chiswick Park tube station
- Christ Church Greyfriars
- Christ Church Spitalfields
- Churchill Museum and Cabinet War Rooms
- Church House
- Church of the Immaculate Heart of Mary (Brompton Oratory)
- Citigroup Centre
- City Hall
- City of London Cemetery and Crematorium
- CityPoint
- City University
- Clapham Junction railway station
- Clarence House
- Claridge's
- Cleopatra's Needle
- The Clink
- Cochrane Theatre
- Coin Street Community Builders
- Coliseum Theatre
- College of Arms
- Colney Hatch Lunatic Asylum
- Comedy Theatre
- Commonwealth Institute
- The Connaught Hotel
- Conservative Campaign Headquarters
- County Hall
- Covent Garden
- Craven Cottage
- Crimean War Memorial
- Criterion Restaurant
- Criterion Theatre
- Crosby Hall
- Crossness Pumping Station
- Crown and Treaty
- Croydon Clocktower
- Croydon Minster
- Croydon Palace
- Croydon Town Hall
- The Crystal Palace
- The Crystal Palace Dinosaurs
- Crystal Palace National Sports Centre
- Crystal Palace transmitting station
- Cumberland Terrace
- Cuming Museum
- Custom House, City of London
- Cutty Sark

== D ==
- Dana Centre
- Danson House
- Dartford Crossing
- De Morgan Centre
- The Den
- Dennis Severs' House
- Department for Environment, Food and Rural Affairs
- Department of Health
- Department for Work and Pensions
- Deptford Town Hall
- Design Museum
- Devonshire House
- Diana Fountain, Bushy Park
- Diana, Princess of Wales Memorial Fountain
- Dr. Johnson's House
- Dolphin Square
- Dominion Theatre
- Dorchester Hotel
- Dover House
- Down House
- Duke of York's Barracks
- Duke of York Column
- Dulwich College
- Dulwich Picture Gallery
- Dutch Church, Austin Friars

== E ==
- Eagle House
- Ealing Abbey
- Ealing Town Hall
- Earls Court Exhibition Centre
- Eastbury Manor House
- East Croydon station
- East Finchley tube station
- East India Docks
- East London Mosque
- Eaton Square
- Eighty Strand
- Elfin Oak
- Eltham Palace
- Embassy of the United States in London
- Emirates Stadium
- Empress State Building
- Equestrian statue of Charles I, Charing Cross
- Euston railway station
- Euston Tower
- Evelina Children's Hospital
- ExCeL Exhibition Centre

== F ==
- Feltham (HM Prison)
- Fenchurch Street railway station
- Fenton House
- Finsbury Estate
- Firepower - The Royal Artillery Museum
- Fitzroy Square
- Florin Court
- Foreign and Commonwealth Office
- Fortnum & Mason
- Forty Hall
- Foundling Museum
- Fournier Street
- Foyles
- Free Church, Hampstead Garden Suburb
- Freemason's Hall
- Freud Museum
- Fulham Palace
- Fulham Railway Bridge

== G ==
- Gaiety Theatre
- Garrick Club
- Garrick Theatre
- Geffrye Museum
- The George Inn, Southwark
- Gibson Gardens
- Gielgud Theatre
- Globe Theatre
- Golden Lane Estate
- Golders Green Crematorium
- Goldsmiths College
- Gordon Square
- Gray's Inn
- Greenland Passage
- Great Ormond Street Hospital
- Green Park
- Greenwich foot tunnel
- Greenwich Hospital
- Greenwich Millennium Village
- Greenwich Power Station
- Greenwich Theatre
- Gresham Club
- Grosvenor Bridge
- Grosvenor Chapel
- Grosvenor House Hotel
- Grosvenor Square
- Grove Park (Sutton)
- Grovelands Park
- Griffin Park
- Grim's Dyke
- The Guards Chapel
- Guildhall
- Guildhall School of Music and Drama
- Gunnersbury Park
- Gurdwara Sri Guru Singh Sabha
- Guy's Hospital
- Gwydyr House
- The Gherkin

== H ==
- Hackney Empire
- Hackney Town Hall
- Hall Place
- Ham House
- Hamleys
- Hammersmith Apollo
- Hammersmith Bridge
- Hammersmith Flyover
- Hammersmith Town Hall
- Hampton Court Bridge
- Hampton Court Palace
- Handel House Museum
- Hanover Square
- Hanwell Asylum
- Hare Hall
- Harrods
- Harrow School
- Haymarket Theatre
- Hay's Galleria
- The Hayward
- Heathrow Airport
- Hendon Police College
- His Majesty's Theatre
- HM Treasury
- HMS Belfast
- HMS President
- Heythrop College
- Highgate Cemetery
- Highpoint I
- Hippodrome
- Hither Green Cemetery
- Hogarth's House
- Holborn Viaduct
- Holland House
- Holloway (HM Prison)
- Holwood House
- Holy Trinity Church Marylebone
- Holy Trinity College Bromley
- Holy Trinity, Sloane Street
- Home Office
- Hoover Building
- Hop Exchange
- Horniman Museum
- Hornsey Town Hall
- Horse Guards
- Horse Guards Parade
- HSBC Tower, London
- Hungerford Bridge
- Hurlingham Club
- Hyde Park
- Hyde Park Barracks

== I ==
- Ickenham Hall
- Imperial College
- Imperial War Museum
- India House (London)
- Inner London Crown Court
- Inner Temple
- Institute of Cancer Research
- Institute of Chartered Accountants in England & Wales
- Institute of Contemporary Arts
- Institute of Education
- InterContinental London Park Lane Hotel
- Isis (HM Prison)
- Isokon building

== J ==
- Jewel Tower
- Jewish Museum (Camden)
- John Smith House (Southwark)
- Jubilee Gardens, South Bank

== K ==
- Keats' House
- Kennington Park
- Kensal Green Cemetery
- Kensington Palace
- Kensington Palace Gardens
- Kensington Roof Gardens
- Keston Windmill
- Kew Bridge
- Kew Bridge Steam Museum
- Kew Palace
- Kew Railway Bridge
- Kenwood House
- Kimpton Fitzroy London Hotel (Hotel Russell)
- King's College
- King's Cross railway station
- King's Observatory
- King's Reach Tower
- Kingston Bridge
- Kingston Railway Bridge
- Kingston University
- Kingston upon Thames Guildhall
- Kingsway tramway subway
- Kneller Hall

== L ==
- Laban Dance Centre
- Lambeth Bridge
- Lambeth Palace
- Lambeth Town Hall
- Lancaster House
- The Landmark London
- The Lanesborough
- Langham Hotel
- Langtons
- Lansbury Estate
- Lansdowne House
- Latchmere House
- Lauderdale House
- Law Society of England and Wales
- Leadenhall Market
- Leicester Square
- Leighton House Museum
- Lewisham Shopping Centre
- Limehouse Basin
- Limehouse Town Hall
- Liberty's
- Liberty Shopping Centre
- Lincoln's Inn
- Lincoln's Inn Fields
- Linley Sambourne House
- Liverpool Street station
- Lloyd's of London
- Loftus Road
- Londonderry House
- The London Ark
- London Biggin Hill Airport
- London Bridge
- London Bridge rail station
- London Business School
- London Central Mosque
- London Charterhouse
- London City Airport
- London Docks
- London Eye
- London Fire Brigade Museum
- London Hilton on Park Lane Hotel
- London IMAX
- London Metropolitan University
- London Palladium
- London Planetarium
- London School of Economics
- London School of Hygiene & Tropical Medicine
- London South Bank University
- London Stock Exchange
- The London Studios
- London Velopark
- London Victoria station
- London Wall
- London Zoo
- Lord's Cricket Ground
- Lots Road Power Station
- Lowther Lodge
- Lyceum Theatre
- Lyric Theatre

== M ==
- Madame Tussaud's
- The Mall
- Malta High Commission in London
- Manchester Square
- Mansion House
- Marble Arch
- Marble Hill House
- Marlborough House
- Marx Memorial Library
- Marylebone station
- Mayesbrook Park
- Marylebone Town Hall
- Metro Central Heights
- Metropolitan Tabernacle
- MI6
- Michelin House
- Middle Temple
- Middlesex Guildhall
- Middlesex University
- Millbank Tower
- Millennium Bridge
- Millennium Dome
- Ministry of Agriculture, Fisheries and Food
- Ministry of Defence
- Monument to the Great Fire of London
- Monument to the Women of World War II
- Moorfields Eye Hospital
- Morden College
- Mount Pleasant sorting office
- Museum of Garden History
- Museum of London
- Mycenae House

== N ==
- The National Archives
- National Army Museum
- National Film Theatre
- National Firefighters Memorial
- National Gallery
- National Liberal Club
- National Maritime Museum
- National Physical Laboratory
- National Police Memorial
- National Portrait Gallery
- Natural History Museum
- Naval & Military Club
- Neasden Temple
- Nelson's Column
- New Covent Garden Market
- New Spitalfields Market
- New West End Synagogue
- New Zealand House
- Noël Coward Theatre
- Nordic churches in London
- Norman Shaw Building
- Northumberland House
- Northwick Park Hospital
- North Woolwich Old Station Museum
- Notre Dame de France
- No 1 Poultry
- Nunhead Cemetery

== O ==
- Odeon Leicester Square
- The Old Bailey
- Old Deer Park
- Old Spitalfields market
- Old Vic
- Olde Cheshire Cheese
- Olympia, London
- Olympic Stadium (London)
- One Canada Square (Canary Wharf Tower)
- One Churchill Place
- Oriental Club
- Orleans House
- Osterley Park
- Oxford and Cambridge Club
- Oxford Circus
- The Oval
- OXO Tower

== P ==
- Paddington Basin
- Paddington Green Police Station
- Paddington Station
- Great Pagoda, Kew Gardens
- Palace Theatre
- Palace of Westminster
- Palm House
- Parsloes Park
- Paternoster Square
- Peace Pagoda
- Peckham Library
- Pembroke Lodge, Richmond Park
- Pentonville (HM Prison)
- Peter Jones (department store)
- Petrie Museum of Egyptian Archaeology
- Phoenix Cinema
- Phoenix Garden
- Phoenix Theatre
- Piccadilly Circus
- Pitzhanger Manor
- Playhouse Theatre
- Plumstead Common Windmill
- Polish War Memorial
- Portcullis House
- Portland House
- Postman's Park
- Public Record Office
- Purcell Room
- Putney Bridge
- Putney Vale Cemetery

== Q ==
- Queen Elizabeth II Conference Centre
- Queen Elizabeth Hall
- Queen Elizabeth II Bridge
- Queen Mary, University of London
- Queen's Beasts
- Queen's Chapel
- Queen's House, Greenwich
- Queen's Tower

== R ==
- Ranger's House
- Red House, several places
- Reform Club
- Regent's Canal
- Regent's College
- Regent's Park
- Regent's Park Barracks
- Regent Street
- Richmond Bridge
- Richmond Lock and Footbridge
- Richmond Palace
- Richmond Park
- Richmond Railway Bridge
- Richmond Theatre
- Ritz Hotel
- Robin Hood Gardens
- Rotherhithe Tunnel
- The Roundhouse
- Royal Academy of Dramatic Art
- Royal Academy of Music
- Royal Air Force Club
- Royal Air Force Museum London
- Royal Albert Hall
- Royal Arsenal
- Royal Artillery Barracks
- Royal Artillery Memorial
- Royal Automobile Club
- Royal Botanic Gardens, Kew
- Royal Brompton Hospital
- Royal College of Art
- Royal College of Music
- Royal College of Physicians
- Royal College of Surgeons of England
- Royal Courts of Justice
- Royal Court Theatre
- Royal Docks
- Royal Exchange
- Royal Festival Hall
- Royal Free Hospital
- Royal Holloway, University of London
- Royal Hospital Chelsea
- Royal Institute of British Architects
- Royal Institution
- Royal London Hospital
- Royal Mews
- Royal Military School of Music
- Royal National Theatre
- Royal Opera House
- Royal Observatory, Greenwich
- Royal Over-Seas League
- Royal Pharmaceutical Society
- Royal School of Mines
- Royal Society
- Royal Thames Yacht Club
- Royal Veterinary College
- Rules (restaurant)
- Ruskin House
- Russell Square

== S ==
- Saatchi Gallery
- Sadler's Wells Theatre
- St Alfege's Church, Greenwich
- St Andrew-by-the-Wardrobe
- St Andrew, Holborn
- St Andrew Undershaft
- St Andrew's Church, Hornchurch
- St Andrew's Enfield
- St Anne and St Agnes
- St Anne's Church, Kew
- St Anne's Limehouse
- St Augustine Watling Street
- St Augustine's, Queen's Gate
- St Bartholomew's Hospital
- St Bartholomew-the-Great
- St Bartholomew-the-Less
- St Benet Paul's Wharf
- St Botolph's, Aldersgate
- St Botolph without Aldgate
- St Botolph-without-Bishopsgate
- St Bride's Church
- St. Clement Danes
- St Clement Eastcheap
- St Columba's Church
- St Cuthbert's, Earls Court
- St Dunstan-in-the-East
- St Dunstan's, Stepney
- St Dunstan-in-the-West
- St Edmund, King and Martyr
- St Edward the Confessor, Romford
- St Ethelburga's Bishopsgate
- St Etheldreda's Church
- St George's Cathedral Southwark
- St. George's Church, Bloomsbury
- St George's, Hanover Square
- St George's Hospital
- St George in the East
- St George the Martyr, Holborn
- St George the Martyr Southwark
- St Giles in the Fields
- St Giles-without-Cripplegate
- St Helen's Bishopsgate
- St. James's Palace
- St James's Church, Piccadilly
- St James Church, Clerkenwell
- St James's Club
- St James Garlickhythe
- St James's Hotel and Club
- St. James's Park
- St. James's Square
- St James the Less, Pimlico
- St John-at-Hackney
- St John-at-Hampstead
- St John's Church, Waterloo
- St John's Gate, Clerkenwell
- St. John's, Smith Square
- St John's Wood Church
- St John the Baptist Church, Chipping Barnet
- St John the Baptist, Pinner
- St John the Divine, Kennington
- St Joseph's Church, Highgate
- St Jude's Church, Hampstead Garden Suburb
- St Katherine Cree
- St Katharine Docks
- St Lawrence Jewry
- St Leonard's, Shoreditch
- St Luke's Church, Chelsea
- St Magnus-the-Martyr
- St Margaret Lothbury
- St Margaret Pattens
- St Margaret's, Westminster
- St Mark's Church, Bromley
- St Mark's Church, Kennington
- St Martin-in-the-Fields
- St Martin, Ludgate
- St Martin's Theatre
- St Mary Abbots
- St Mary Abchurch
- St Mary Aldermary
- St Mary-at-Finchley Church
- St Mary-at-Hill
- St Mary Magdalen Bermondsey
- St Mary Magdalene Gardens
- St Mary Magdalene Church, Holloway Road
- St Mary Magdalene, Paddington
- St Mary Magdalene, Richmond
- St Mary Magdalene Woolwich
- St Mary Moorfields
- St Mary-le-Bow
- St Mary-le-Strand
- St Mary the Virgin, Mortlake
- St Mary Woolnoth
- St Mary's Church, Barnes
- St Mary's Church, Battersea
- St Mary's Church, Hampstead
- St Mary's Church, Hampton
- St Mary's Church, Hendon
- St Mary's Church, Paddington
- St Mary's Church, Putney
- St Mary's Church, Rotherhithe
- St. Mary's Church, Walthamstow
- St Mary's Church, Wimbledon
- St Mary's, Harrow on the Hill
- St Mary's Hospital
- St Mary's, Islington
- St Mary's, Twickenham
- St Mary's University College, Twickenham
- St Marylebone Parish Church
- St Matthias Church, Richmond
- St Matthias Old Church
- St Michael, Cornhill
- St Michael and All Angels, Bedford Park
- St Michael Paternoster Royal
- St Michael's Church, Camden Town
- St Nicholas Church, Chiswick
- St Nicholas Church, Sutton, London
- St Nicholas Cole Abbey
- St Olave Hart Street
- St Pancras New Church
- St Pancras Old Church
- St Pancras railway station
- St Patrick's Church, Soho Square
- St Paul's Cathedral
- St Paul's Church, Knightsbridge
- St. Paul's Church, Shadwell
- St Paul's, Covent Garden
- St. Paul's, Deptford
- St Paul's, Hammersmith
- St Peter ad Vincula
- St Peter and St Paul, Bromley
- St Peter upon Cornhill
- St Peter's Church, Hammersmith
- St Peter's Church, Petersham
- St Peter's Church, Walworth
- St Raphael's Church, Surbiton
- St Saviour, Pimlico
- St Sepulchre-without-Newgate
- St Sophia's Cathedral
- St Stephen Walbrook
- St Thomas Church
- St Thomas's Hospital
- St Vedast Foster Lane
- Savoy Chapel
- Savoy Hotel
- Savoy Theatre
- Science Museum
- Schomberg House
- School of Oriental and African Studies
- The School of Pharmacy, University of London
- Scotland Yard
- Seaford House
- Selfridges
- Senate House (University of London)
- Serpentine Gallery
- Shadwell Basin
- Shell Tower
- Shirley Windmill
- Sir John Soane's Museum
- Sloane Square
- Smithfield Market
- Somerset House
- South Africa House
- Southgate tube station
- Southside House
- Southside Wandsworth
- Southwark Bridge
- Southwark Cathedral
- Spencer House
- Stamford Bridge (stadium)
- Statue of Eros (Piccadilly Circus)
- Strand Palace Hotel
- Stratford Circus
- Stratford railway station
- Sudbury Hill tube station
- Sudbury Town tube station
- Surbiton railway station
- Surrey Commercial Docks
- Surrey Quays Shopping Centre
- Sutton House
- Swakeleys House
- Swiss Cottage Central Library
- Syon House

== T ==
- Tate Britain
- Tate Modern
- Tavistock Square
- Teddington Lock
- Telehouse Docklands
- Temperate House
- Temple Bar
- Temple Church
- Thames Barrier
- Thames Embankment
- Thames House
- Thameside (HM Prison)
- Thames Tunnel
- Thames Valley University
- Thatched House Lodge
- Theatre503
- Theatre Museum
- Theatre Royal, Drury Lane
- Theatre Royal Stratford East
- The Shard
- Thistle Tower Hotel
- Thorpe Coombe Hospital
- Three Mills
- Tower 42 (Natwest Tower)
- Tower Bridge
- Tower Hamlets Cemetery
- Tower of London
- Tower Hill Memorial
- The Tower House
- Trades Union Congress
- Trafalgar Square
- Transport Museum
- Travellers Club
- Trellick Tower
- Trinity Buoy Wharf
- Trinity Church, Sutton
- Trinity House
- Trinity Independent Chapel
- Trocadero
- Twickenham Bridge
- Twickenham Film Studios
- Twickenham Stadium
- Twinings

== U ==
- Unicorn Theatre
- Unilever House
- Union Chapel
- Union Jack Club
- United University Club
- University College Hospital
- University College, London
- University of East London
- University of Greenwich
- University of North London
- University of the Arts London
- University of Westminster
- University Women's Club
- Upminster Windmill
- Uxbridge tube station

== V ==
- Valence House Museum
- Valentines Park
- Vanbrugh Castle
- Vauxhall Bridge
- Vestry House Museum
- Victoria and Albert Museum
- V&A Museum of Childhood
- Victoria Coach Station
- Victoria Embankment
- Victoria Memorial
- Victoria Palace Theatre
- Victoria Park, East London
- Victoria Park, Finchley

== W ==
- The Waldorf Hilton, London
- Wales Office (Gwydyr House)
- Wallace Collection
- Waltham Forest Town Hall
- Wandsworth Bridge
- Wandsworth Common Windmill
- Wandsworth (HM Prison)
- Wanstead House
- War Office
- Warehouse Theatre
- Wat Buddhapadipa
- Waterloo Bridge
- Waterloo station
- Waterside
- Wellcome Trust
- Wellington Arch
- Wellington Barracks
- Wembley Arena
- Wembley Stadium
- Westfield
- West India Docks
- West London Synagogue
- Westminster Abbey
- Westminster Bridge
- Westminster Cathedral
- Westminster Central Hall
- Westminster School
- West Norwood Cemetery
- Whitechapel Gallery
- Whitechapel Idea Store
- Whitefield's Tabernacle, Tottenham Court Road
- White Hart Lane
- Whiteleys
- White Lodge, Richmond Park
- White's
- Whitgift Centre
- Wigmore Hall
- William Morris Gallery
- Willis Building
- Wimbledon Windmill
- Winchester Palace
- Winfield House
- Woburn Square
- The Women's Library
- Woodlands House
- Woolwich foot tunnel
- Woolwich Town Hall
- Wormwood Scrubs (HM Prison)
- Worshipful Company of Drapers
- Worshipful Company of Fishmongers
- Worshipful Company of Glaziers and Painters of Glass
- Worshipful Company of Goldsmiths

== Y ==
- Yalding House
- York House, Strand
- York House, Twickenham
- Young's Brewery

== Z ==
- Zimbabwe House

== See also ==
- List of buildings and structures
- List of London venues
- List of London Underground stations
- List of London railway stations
- Tall buildings in London. The
- Category:Buildings and structures in London
