= 40 Bank Street =

Skyscraper in Heron Quays, Docklands, London

Coordinates: 51°30′9.5″N 00°01′10.6″W

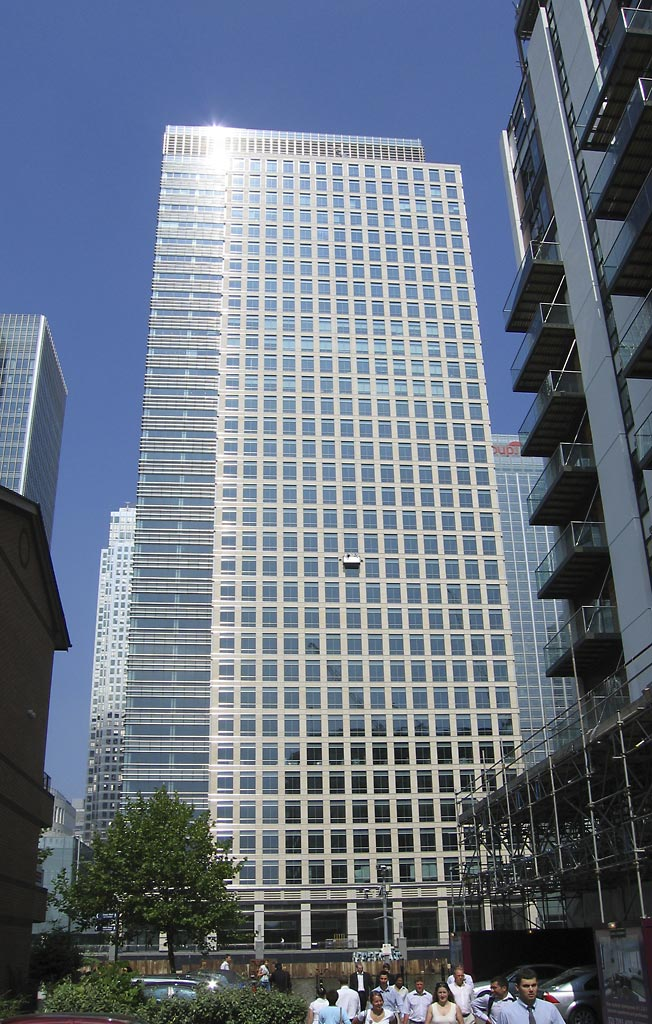
- 40 Bank Street in 2005, viewed from the South

General information
- Type: Office
- Architectural style: Modernism
- Location: London, E14
- Construction started: 2000
- Completed: 2003

Height
- Roof: 502 feet (153 m)

Technical details
- Floor count: 30

Design and construction
- Architects: Cesar Pelli & Associates, Adamson Associates Architect (as executive architect)
- Developer: Canary Wharf Group

40 Bank Street is a skyscraper in Heron Quays which overlooks the London Docklands. It is 502 feet (153 m) tall, having 30 stories and a total floor area of 634,000 square feet (58,900 m^{2}). The building was designed by Cesar Pelli & Associates, and was built by Canary Wharf Contractors in 2003. The executive architect was Adamson Associates. As of 2025, the Council on Tall Buildings and Urban Habitat lists 40 Bank Street as the 38th tallest building in London and the 43rd tallest building in the United Kingdom.

== Construction ==
During a wave of development in the early 2000s, 40 Bank Street was among the first six skyscrapers to be built on Canary Wharf after One Canada Square (along with 8 Canada Square, 25 Canada Square, One Churchill Place, 25 Bank Street, and 10 Upper Bank Street). Construction on 40 Bank Street began in 2000 and was completed in 2003. The executive architect was Adamson Associates. The curtain walls were manufactured by Permasteelisa. Canary Wharf Group renovated the lobby from 2020 to 2023, which included security upgrades.

== Design ==
40 Bank Street is the most slender of the three towers speculatively built by Canary Wharf Group on Heron Quays (the others being 25 Bank Street and One Churchill Place). Whereas 25 Bank Street was designed in the International Style, 40 Bank Street is a modernist structure. The building has uniformly spaced windows bounded by a light-coloured stone facade—recalling the 1980s-style buildings in the area—except for a glass section which runs along the side and onto the top of the structure. The solid facade meets the glass curtain walls in such a way as to give the impression that two different buildings have been fused together, an effect that Pelli also employed at the World Financial Center in New York City. The windows are slightly recessed from the facade, giving the illusion, in certain lightning, that the windows are hollow openings. The proportion between the window openings along the curtain wall was chosen in order to emphasise the height of the building.

The building is 502 feet (153 m) tall, having 30 stories and a total floor area of 634,000 square feet (58,900 m^{2}). As of 2025, the Council on Tall Buildings and Urban Habitat lists 40 Bank Street as the 38th tallest building in London and the 43rd tallest building in the United Kingdom. Immediately to the west of 40 Bank Street is 25 Bank Street, a skyscraper of the same height, while to the east is a shorter building, 50 Bank Street, which has the same architectural style of 40 Bank Street. 25, 40, and 50 Bank Street were all designed by Pelli and are connected by glass winter gardens. 40 Bank Street connects to Jubilee Place, an underground shopping mall.

== Occupants ==
The original tenants at 40 Bank Street were Allen & Overy and Skadden, Arps, Slate, Meagher & Flom. Skadden, after consultation with JLL, left 40 Bank Street in 2021 and relocated to 22 Bishopsgate. Allen & Overy experimented with new workspace concepts in 40 Bank Street prior to expanding to Bishops Square. Allen & Overy sublet two floors of the building in 2013, at £35 per square foot (£380/m^{2}).

In 2022, Canary Wharf Group began offering fully-fitted office space at 40 Bank Street, with Citibank being its first customer. In 2023, HVIVO, a research group specialising in human trials signed a ten-year lease for 39,049 square feet (3,627.8 m^{2}) of office space at 40 Bank Street.

In 2025, banking firm HSBC announced that they had signed a lease for 11 floors in the building to house a portion of their head office staff once they have vacated their current head office in 2027 at the nearby 8 Canada Square, also on the Canary Wharf estate.
