= 20 Bank Street (London) =

Coordinates: 51.5030°N 0.0223°W

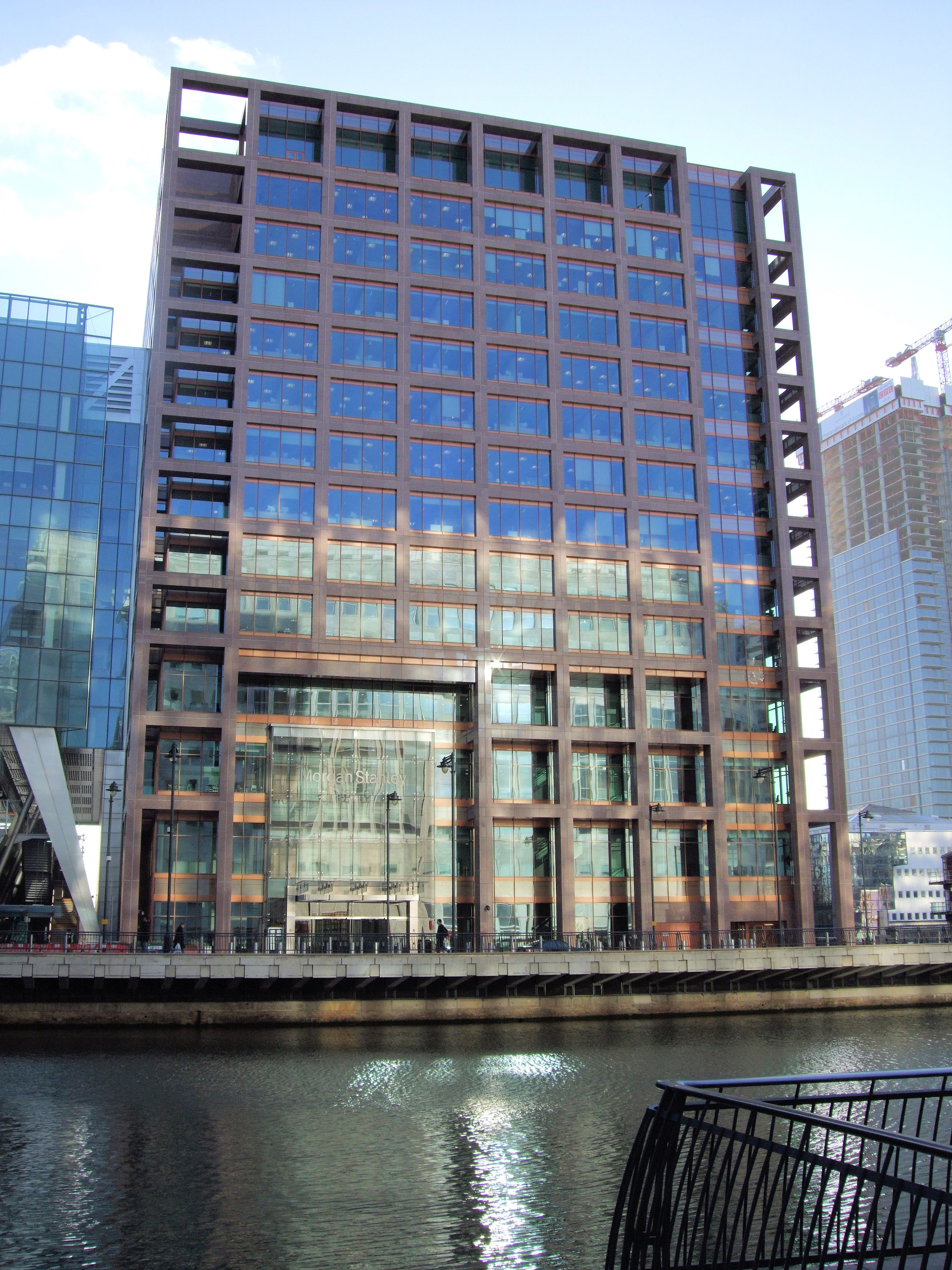
- Northern façade in 2008
- Interactive map of the 20 Bank Street area
- Alternative names: Morgan Stanley Building

General information
- Status: Completed
- Type: Office
- Construction started: 2000
- Completed: 2003

Technical details
- Floor count: 14
- Floor area: 47,565 square metres (511,990 sq ft)

Design and construction
- Architects: Skidmore, Owings & Merrill

20 Bank Street (Heron Quays 1 (HQ1) or the Morgan Stanley Building) is a 14-storey office building located in the Canary Wharf development in London, United Kingdom.

Completed in 2003, the building was designed by the architectural firm Skidmore, Owings & Merrill (SOM). It is 68 metres (223 ft) tall with a floorspace of 47,565 square metres (511,990 sq ft).

It is the European headquarters of Morgan Stanley, housing equity and fixed income trading floors, investment banking, technology and other support functions.

== Location ==
Located on Bank Street, 20 Bank Street sits between the South Dock and Middle Dock in Canary Wharf. It is situated very close to the Wardian Towers and 25 Bank Street.

=== Transport ===
The building is situated next to the Heron Quays DLR Station.

== History ==
=== Design and construction ===
It is the second building designed by SOM for Morgan Stanley in Canary Wharf after Founders Court. 20 Bank Street is a grid-frame structure with a skylit atrium. With a granite-clad core on its eastern side to shield against the adjacent DLR station, 20 Bank Street's design features a U-shaped configuration on its lower floors to maximize natural light, leading to a prominent atrium with a large glass wall. Construction began in 2000 and completed in 2003.

=== Tennants ===
It has been the European headquarters of Morgan Stanley since the building was completed. After their lease was set to end in 2028, the Morgan Stanley UK Group extended their lease on the building until 2038. A part of this deal includes a large refurbishment of the building to upgrade its energy efficiency. This work is expected to cost more than £350 million.

== Gallery ==
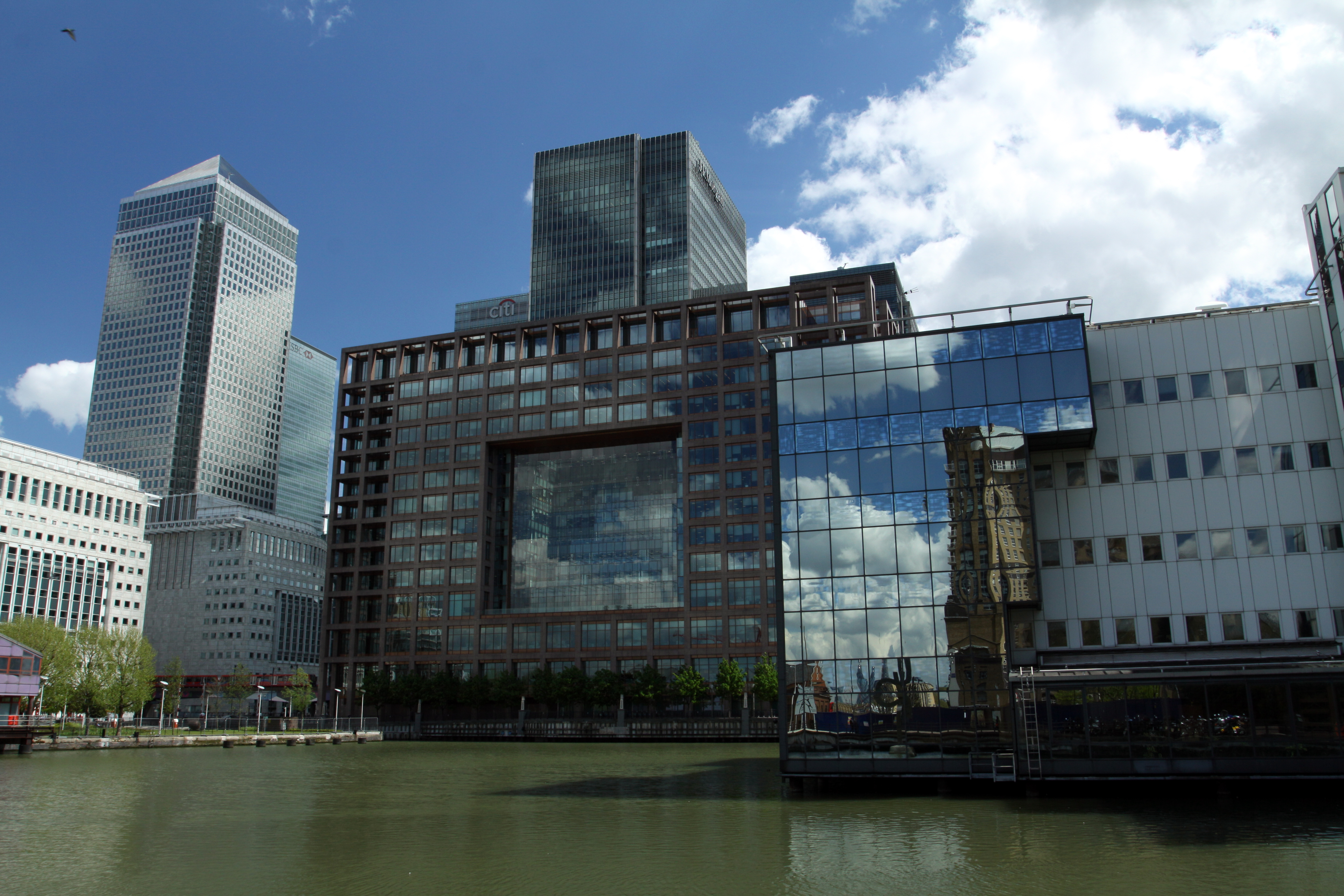
20 Bank Street to the right of One Canada Square

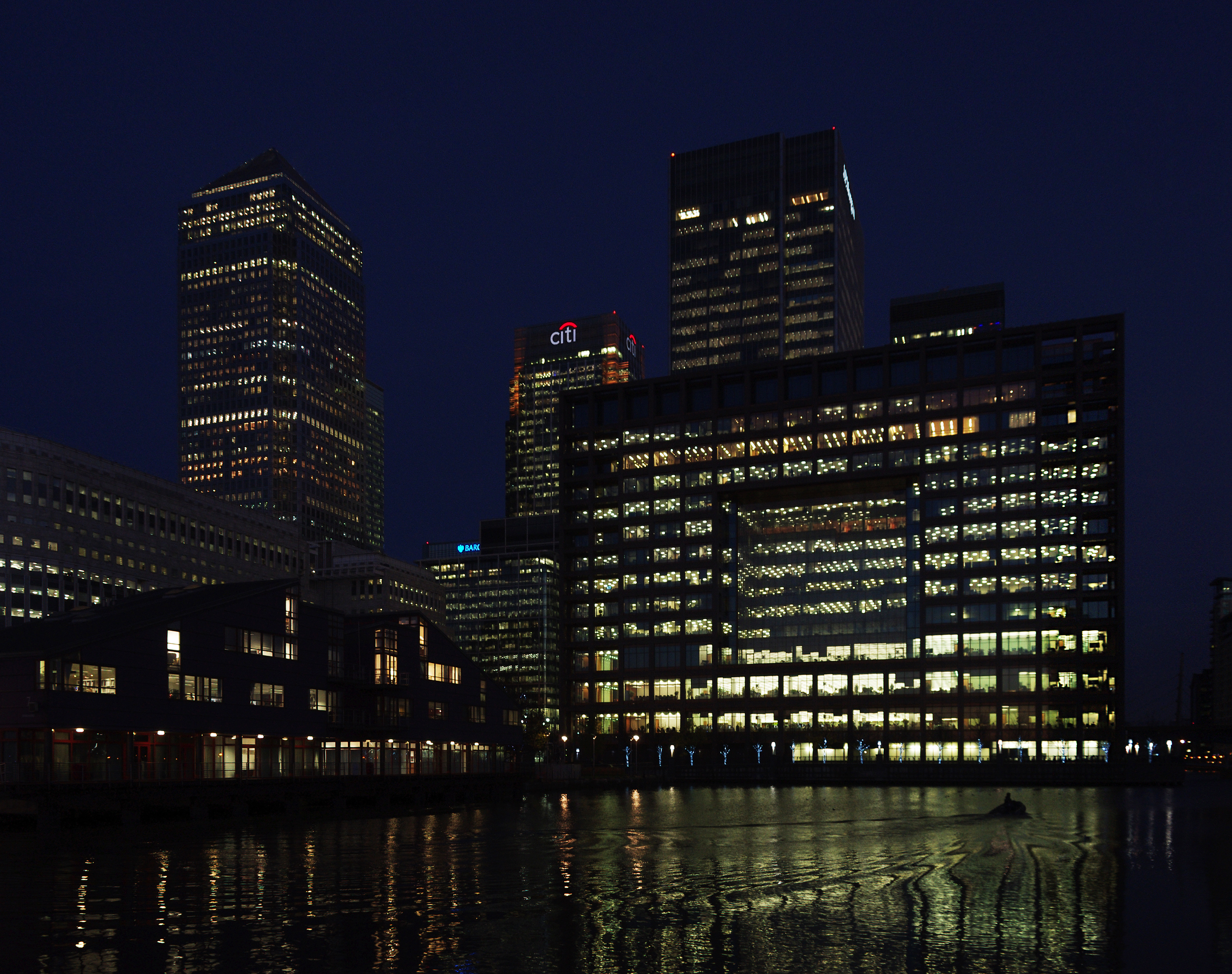
West façade at night

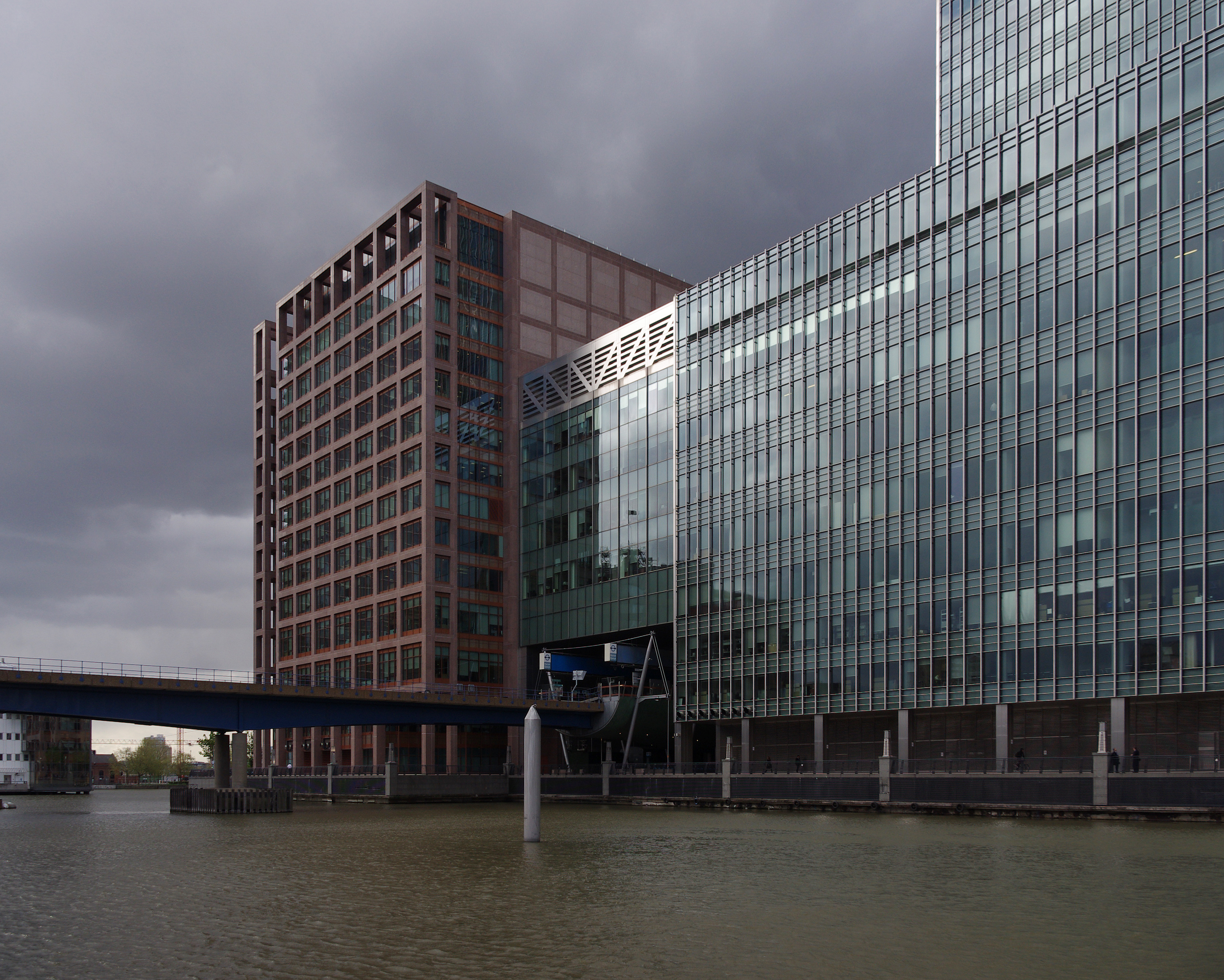
Heron Quays DLR Station to the right of 20 Bank Street
