= Heron Quays =

Area of Canary Wharf, London

Coordinates: 51.5035°N 0.0230°W

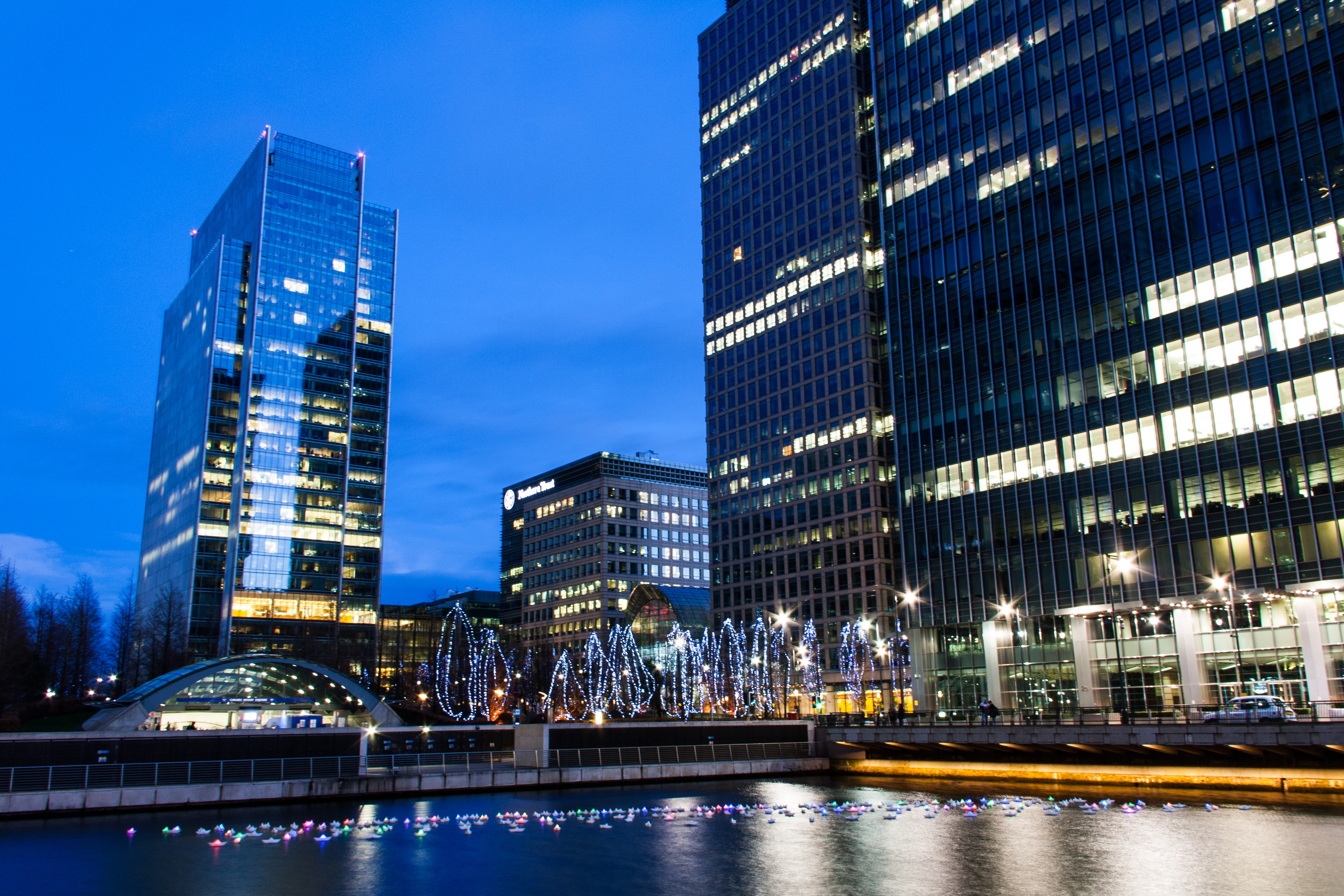
Heron Quays looking down Bank Street from Canary Wharf

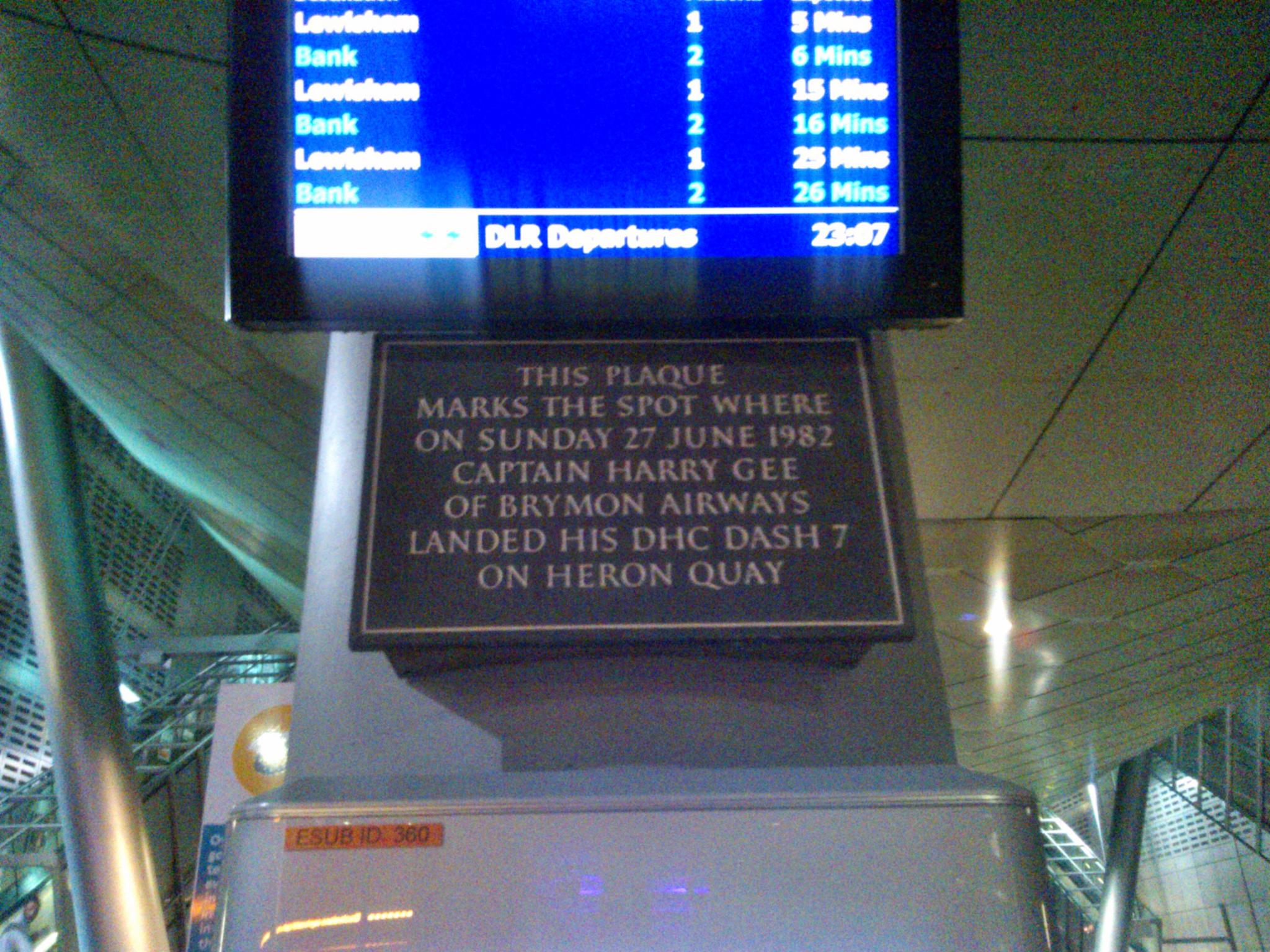
Plaque at commemorating the landing by Captain Harry Gee at Heron Quays in 1982

Heron Quays is an area of the Canary Wharf development on the Isle of Dogs, part of the London Docklands. It is served by a railway station on the London Docklands Light Railway network, Heron Quays DLR station, which was moved south after the development was expanded.

Three skyscrapers dominate the area: 25 Bank Street, 40 Bank Street and 10 Upper Bank Street.

Heron Quays was an area of dockside and warehousing which separated South Dock and Middle (Export) Dock of the West India Docks complex, completed in 1802 to service Britain's rapidly increasing trade with its global empire. However, by the 1970s the area had experienced a decline in industry and was derelict.

The nearest London Underground station is Canary Wharf on the Jubilee line and Heron Quays DLR station is a station on the Docklands Light Railway, both stations within London fare zone 2.

The Heron Quays area of the Isle of Dogs was one of the first areas of the London Docklands to be redeveloped following the formation of the LDDC by an Act of Parliament in 1980. The western half of the site was redeveloped into 2/3 storey commercial/office units in the mid-1980s, some of which stood partly on piles into the dock. These later became known as the 'Red Sheds'.

On 27 June 1982, Brymon Captain Harry Gee landed a De Havilland Canada Dash 7 aircraft on Heron Quay to demonstrate the feasibility of the STOLport project, the forerunner to the London City Airport project. A plaque celebrating this achievement lies above the entrance to the DLR station.

The relatively low-key, lower value style of the development in the early days of the LDDC have given way to high value high rise office development and has now become part of the expanded 'Canary Wharf'. The original DLR station built in near isolation was largely demolished and rebuilt to accommodate rapidly increasing passenger numbers and train lengths. Much of the dock to the North of Heron Quays has been filled in to allow for development, including the construction of the Canary Wharf tube station.
