= 8 Canada Square =

Skyscraper in London, England

Coordinates: 51°30′19″N 0°01′02.6″W

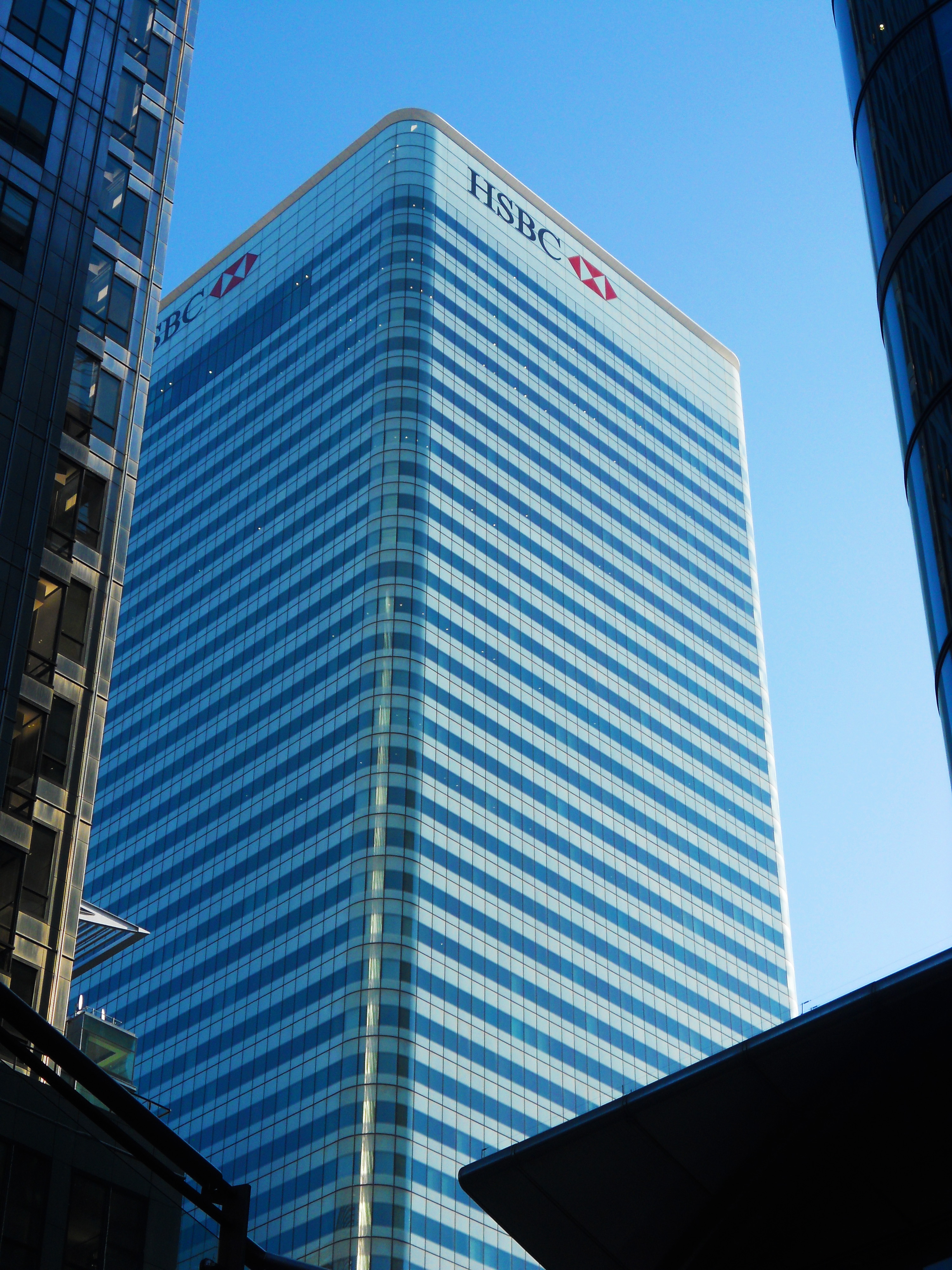
- Interactive map of the 8 Canada Square area

General information
- Location: Canary Wharf; London, E14; United Kingdom
- Construction started: 1999
- Completed: 2002; 24 years ago

Height
- Height: 200 m (656 ft)

Technical details
- Floor count: 45
- Floor area: 164,410 m^{2} (1,769,700 sq ft)

Design and construction
- Architect: Foster + Partners

8 Canada Square is a 45 floor skyscraper in Canary Wharf, London. The building is the global headquarters of HSBC.

== Design and construction ==
Having been commissioned by the owners of the Canary Wharf Site to undertake the outline design prior to gaining site-wide outline planning permission, and because he had designed HSBC's head office in Hong Kong, Norman Foster was appointed as architect.

Construction began in January 1999, with work beginning on the installation of the 4,900 glass panels commencing in the summer of 2000. The work was carried out by Canary Wharf Contractors.

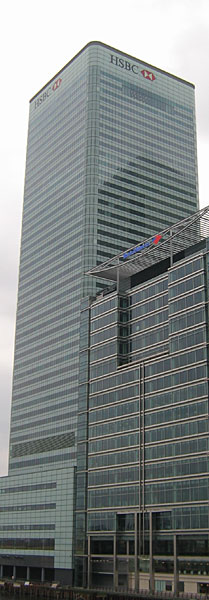
8 Canada Square in 2004, two years after completion.

The topping out ceremony took place on 7 March 2001, with the hoisting in of the final steel girder attended by bankers, journalists and contractors. The first HSBC employees began work in the building on 2 September 2002, with phased occupation completed by 17 February 2003, and the building's official opening, by Sir John Bond, taking place on 2 April 2003.

== Floors ==
The building has 45 above ground floors and 4 basement floors:
Floor	Use
43–44	Lighting system for the building's crown, which also functions as the air intake/exhaust for the air-handling units on this level.
40–42	Audiovisual facilities for presentations, videos, and conference calls.
9–39	Floors 9 through 39 are occupied by offices and conference rooms, with the exception of floors 15, 25, and 34, which are "transfer floors" used to transfer between the four elevator banks.
8	The central equipment room (CER) on this floor is the building's main IT hub, containing necessary equipment for building operations, including local computers and networking gear. It also houses exchanges for the building's telephone extensions. Each floor has satellite equipment rooms (SER) for communication wiring, with over 700 IT cabinets on this floor requiring extensive cabling.
7	Air handlers, gas-fired boilers for generating domestic hot water, serving the level 5 gym changing facilities and the level 6 and level 1 kitchens and Uninterruptible power supply units. These units ensure an instant standby electrical supply for the eighth floor.
6	Client dining rooms
5	Gym with around 120 machines and partially used for trading as well.
2–4	Trading operations, including treasury, capital markets, and equities trading.
1	850-seat Staff Restaurant that serves around 2,500 meals daily.
Ground	Lobby and Reception
B1	Canada Place Mall/HSBC UK Branch
B2–B4	Parking

== Ownership ==
In April 2007, HSBC Tower was sold to Spanish property company Metrovacesa, becoming the first building in Britain to be sold for more than £1bn. As part of the sale, HSBC retained occupancy control and agreed a 20-year lease at a cost of £43.5m per annum.

In December 2008, after Metrovacesa encountered problems with re-financing the bridging loan that HSBC had provided it and as part of a wider debt restructure for Metrovacesa, the bank bought back the property. HSBC stated it had made a £250m profit on the deal.

In November 2009, HSBC once again sold the building, this time to the National Pension Service ("NPS"), the public pension fund for South Korea. HSBC's income statement on completion declared a gain of approximately £350million resulting from the transaction.

In December 2014, Qatar Investment Authority completed the purchase of the building at an undisclosed price, but the building was expected to fetch more than £1.1 billion (US$1.73 billion). NPS was advised by the estate agents JLL and GM Real Estate.

== Occupancy issues ==
In September 2022, a leaked internal memo stated that HSBC was considering whether to renew its lease on the building when it expires in 2027, or whether it would relocate to other premises in London.

In February 2023, The Times reported that roughly 10 floors had been mothballed, having embraced home-working.

In June 2023, the bank subsequently confirmed its intention to move out of the building by 2027 in favour of a property in the City of London.

== Crane accident ==
On 21 May 2000, three workmen employed by Hewden Tower Cranes were killed in a crane accident when the top of a Wolf Luffing crane snapped off into the adjacent North Colonnade area.

An inquest three years later had heard a special safety plug was missing and that there was no anemometer in the crane cab to measure wind speed, although there were no weather problems that day.

The three workmen were Michael Whittard who was 36 from Leeds, Martin Burgess who was 31 from Castleford, West Yorkshire, and Peter Clark who was 33, from Southwark in South London.

A memorial plaque under a tree opposite 8 Canada Square is in memory of these three men who lost their lives that day.

== Falling glass ==
In the summer of 2003, one year after the completion of the tower, the first incident of a glass panel was recorded when it had fallen from the 42nd floor. This incident was during the early morning hours, and no one was injured.

On 9 June 2004, another window panel fell from the plant floor of the tower on the 43rd floor. This had mirrored an almost identical incident a year prior, this time with a reported near miss by a security guard in the afternoon.

Another incident was reported seven years later in 2011, when part of the HSBC signage fell off and smashed to the ground. The glass had fallen over 150 m (490 ft) onto the building's western entrance. The North Colonnade area of Canary Wharf was subsequently closed off while inspection took place. There were no reports of any injuries.

== Extinction Rebellion ==
On the morning of 22 April 2021, coinciding with Earth Day, the environmental activist group Extinction Rebellion vandalised the lobby windows of the tower using chisels and hammers, attempting to smash the glass as part of the protesting against the bank's fossil fuel financing.

Those involved were subsequently arrested on suspicion of criminal damage. Damages relating to the vandalism amounted to approximately £500,000 were caused by the group.

Similar actions of vandalism were carried out by the group at Barclays Head Office also in Canary Wharf at One Churchill Place earlier that month.

== Renovations ==
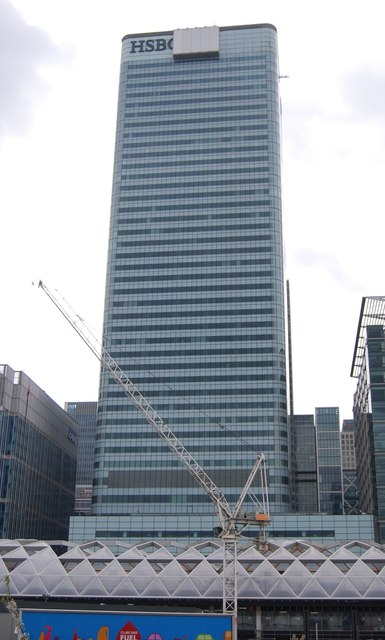
Scaffolding used for the removal and installation of signage.

In early 2013, the tower underwent significant renovation work relating to the installation of new signage, replacing both the embedded lettering and hexagons within the glass panels across all four sides.

This work was carried out by contractors Tara Signs, who engineered and installed the new signage. The project was finished in late 2014.

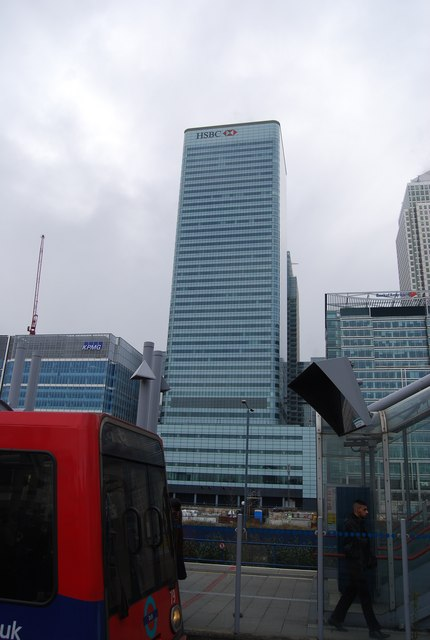
The tower's signage pre 2013 renovations.

The now current signage uses a specially formulated LED enhancing Polycarbonate, giving the appearance of black lettering during the day, and illuminated white during the night.

Lighting behind the tiles were also replaced from fluorescent tube lighting to LED, although rarely used.

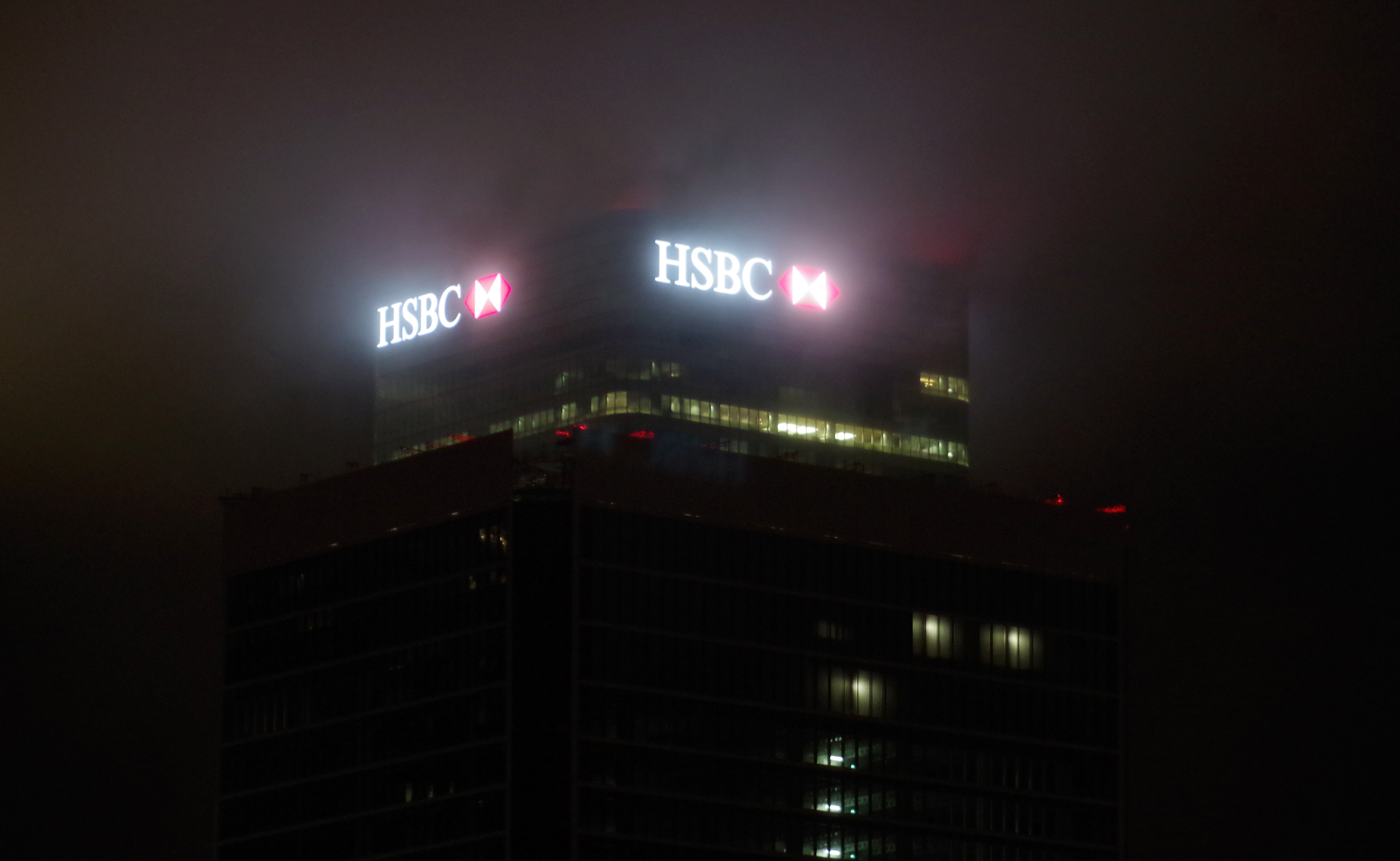
The new signage on 8 Canada Square at night in August 2014.

As of 2018, the HSBC logo installed on the tower is now out-of-date, displaying the previously used font and positioning of the hexagon. It is assumed that the signage will not be updated in the near future due to the bank's intention to vacate the premises in 2027.

== Future redevelopment ==
In July 2024 the Canary Wharf Group and QIA announced plans on redeveloping the property. This would take place after HSBC vacate the property in 2027. The plans involve repurposing the building for multipurpose use. This would include space for retail, leisure, and residential use. The property will also continue to maintain office space. The ambitious plan involves carving out sections of the building and creating a viewing deck.

Several architects were invited to submit plans for the redeveloped and in July 2024 it was announced the Kohn Pedersen Fox won the competition.

== Stephen and Stitt ==
Stephen and Stitt are the names of two bronze lions found at the main entrance of 8 Canada Square. The pair were commissioned for the tower's opening in 2002, soon to be the group's new headquarters.

The lions were cast within sight of the development by the Bronze Age Sculpture Casting Foundry in Limehouse.

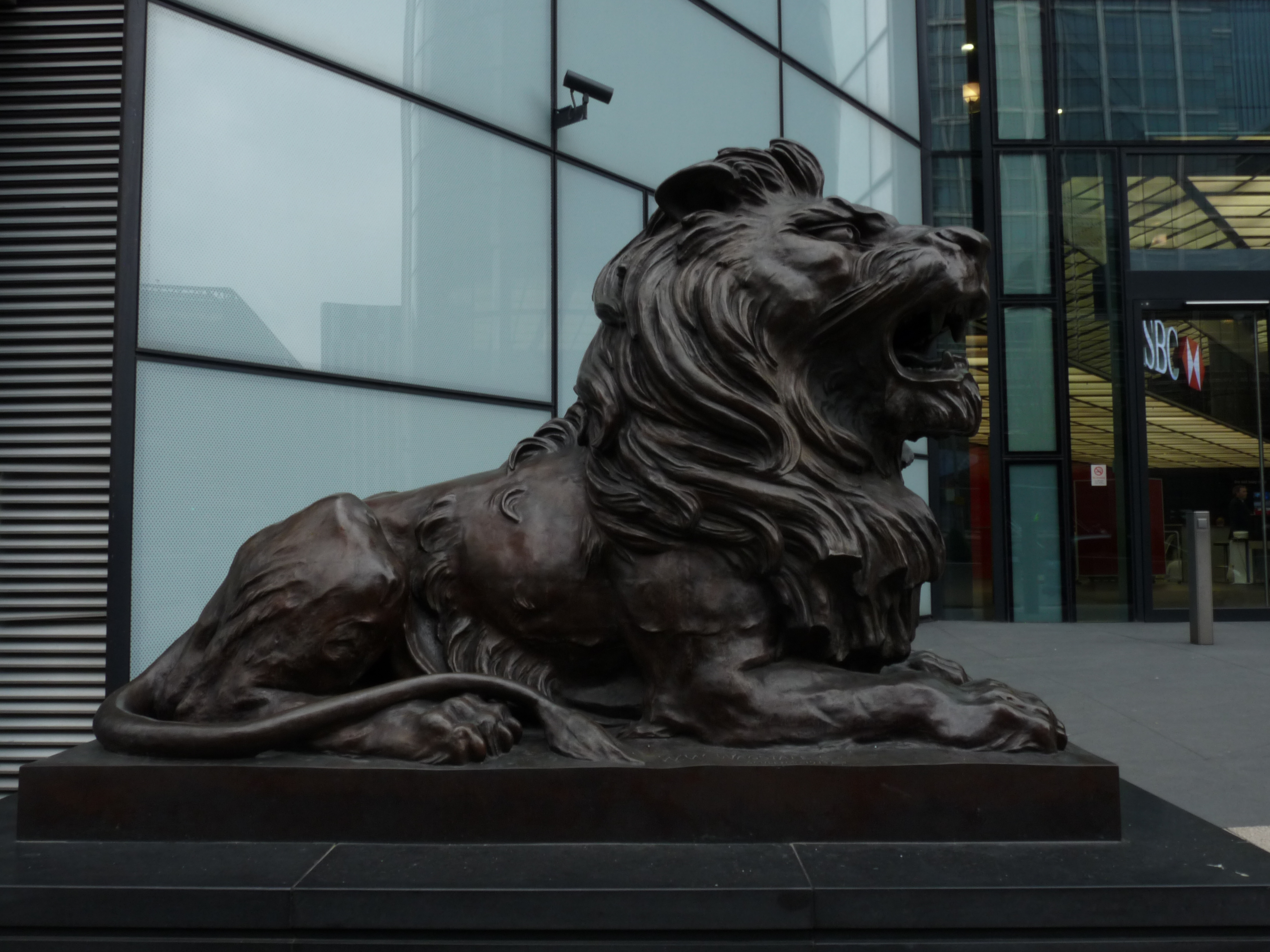
Stephen, positioned to the left of the entrance.

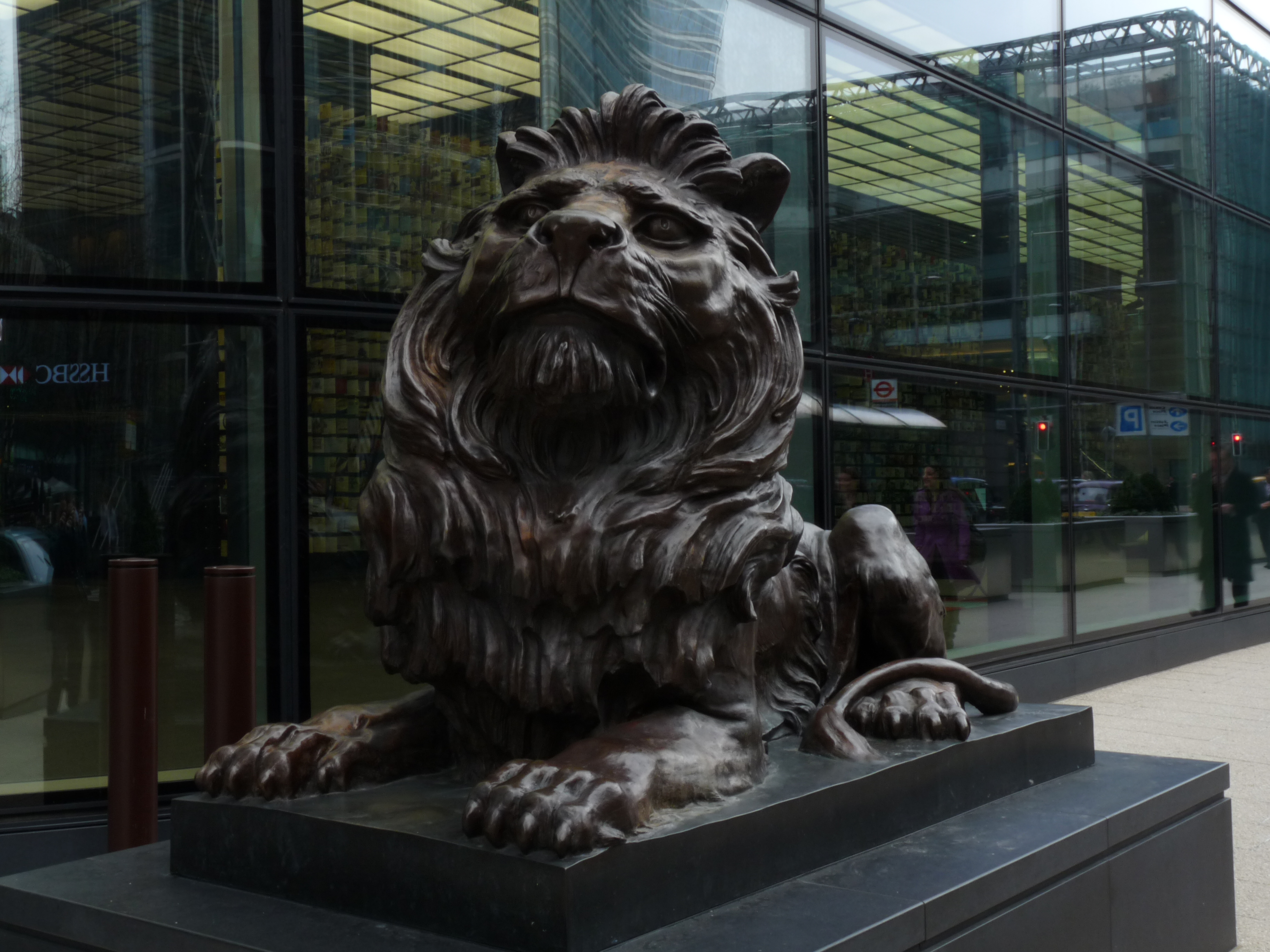
Stitt, positioned to the right of the entrance.

== See also ==
- List of HSBC buildings around the world
- List of tallest buildings and structures in London
- List of tallest buildings and structures in the United Kingdom
- List of tallest buildings in the United Kingdom
