= Canary Wharf Group =

British property company

Canary Wharf Group plc

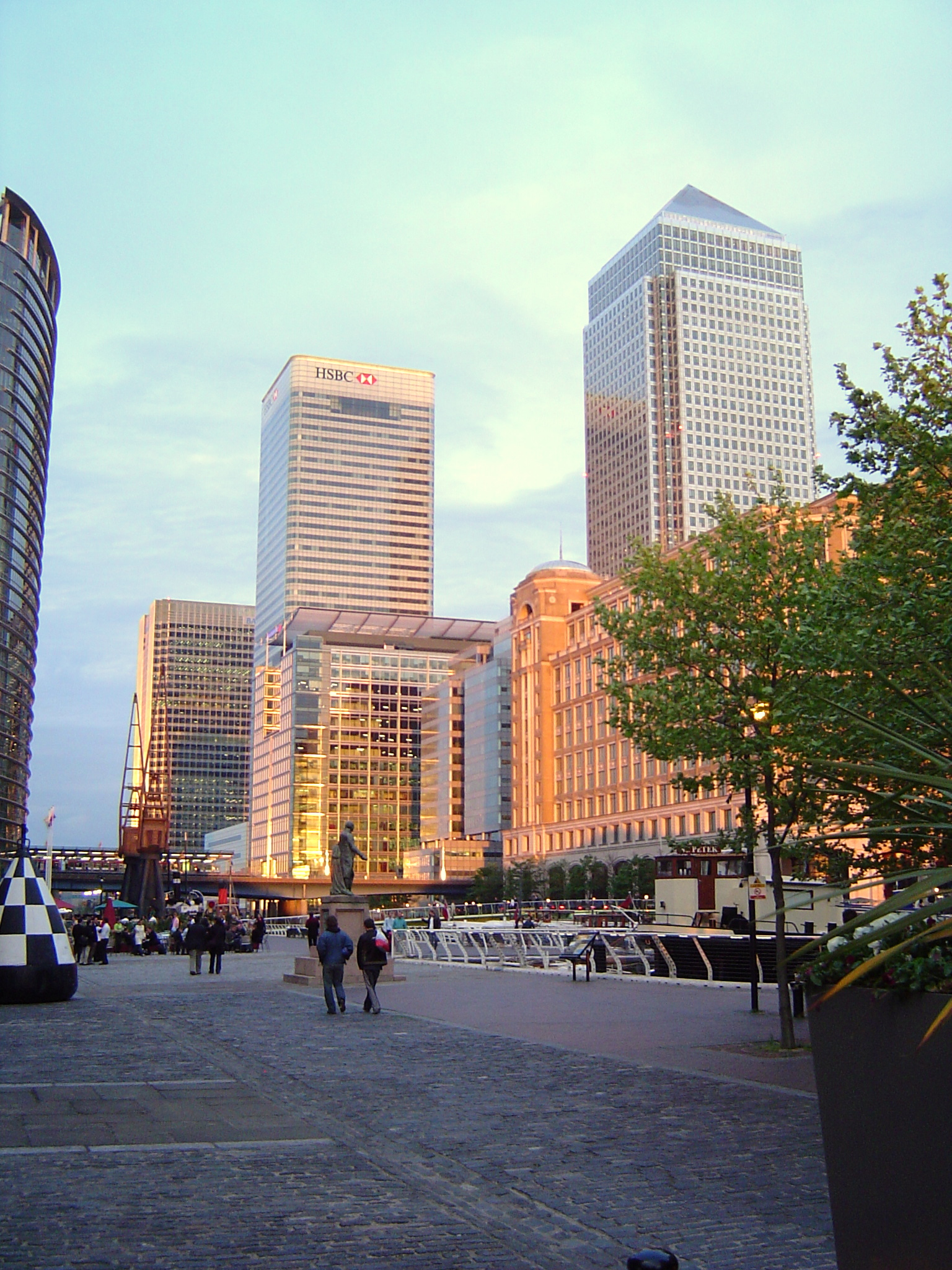
- HSBC World Headquarters and One Canada Square, viewed from the western end of West India Quay
- Type: Public limited company
- Industry: Real estate
- Founded: 1993; 33 years ago
- Headquarters: London, United Kingdom
- Key people: Nigel Wilson (chairman); Shobi Khan (CEO)
- Services: Real estate development
- Net income: £369.6 million (ending 2008)
- Website: cwg.com

Canary Wharf Group plc is a British property company headquartered in London, England. It is the owner and developer of nearly 100 acres (0.40 km^{2}) of property at Canary Wharf and elsewhere in London. The group owns 7,900,000 square feet (730,000 m^{2}) of property which is worth £4.9 billion, of which 95.6% was let as of 30 June 2012.

== History ==
The company was formed in 1993 as Canary Wharf Limited to acquire the former assets of Olympia and York from its administrator.

In December 1995, the company was acquired by an international consortium, including Olympia and York founder Paul Reichmann.

In April 1999, the company floated on the London Stock Exchange.

In 2004, a majority of the company was acquired by Glick Family Investments and Morgan Stanley using an investment vehicle company called Songbird Acquisitions, which was later taken over by China Investment Corporation.

In 2015, Brookfield Properties and Qatar Investment Authority took over Canary Wharf Group for £2.6 billion. Songbird was delisted following the takeover.

== Structure ==
The group owns Canary Wharf Contractors, a business which has built most of the buildings at Canary Wharf. The Canary Wharf Group has also launched Vertus, a build-to-rent arm with properties under development in Canary Wharf.

== Relationship with Transport for London ==
Several large transport projects have been constructed which link to Canary Wharf, including the Jubilee Line Extension, the Docklands Light Railway and Crossrail.

Canary Wharf is well connected by several TFL bus routes, including the D3, D7, and 135, which connect areas like Crossharbour, Poplar, Limehouse, and North Greenwich to Canary Wharf. The 277 bus also serves the Isle of Dogs and nearby areas, while the night buses N550 and N551 connect Canary Wharf to Clapham Junction and Oxford Circus, respectively.

The Canary Wharf Group agreed to pay £500m over 24 years towards the £3.5bn cost of the Jubilee Line extension. The payment was reduced by at least £25m because the line was unable to run at the capacity agreed. Canary Wharf Group built the Canary Wharf railway station for Crossrail at a cost of around £500m, contributing £150m towards the station cost.

The links between Canary Wharf Group and Transport for London remain strong, with Canary Wharf's Finance Director Peter Anderson previously on the board of Transport for London and chairing its finance and policy committee.

The Canary Wharf Group has consistently campaigned against the now defunct Cycle Superhighway routes. In 2014, the Group opposed two cycle routes dubbed "Crossrail for bikes" by anonymously distributing a briefing paper claiming the project would be "extremely damaging to London". In 2018, Canary Wharf Group were a founding member of Unblock the Embankment, a campaign to remove a segregated cycle route along the Embankment.

== Property portfolio ==
Notable property addresses are:

Property address	Sq ft	Leased (2008)	Value (2008)
One Canada Square	1,236,200	99%	£688m
25–30 Bank Street	1,023,300	99%	£410m
One Churchill Place	1,014,400	100%	£630m
10 Upper Bank Street	1,000,400	100%	£645m
All others	3,620,500	99%	£2,110m

Outside Canary Wharf itself, CWG also developed 20 Fenchurch Street and is redeveloping the Shell Centre site in central London.

== See also ==
- Paul Reichmann
