= Heron Quays DLR station =

Docklands Light Railway station

Heron Quays
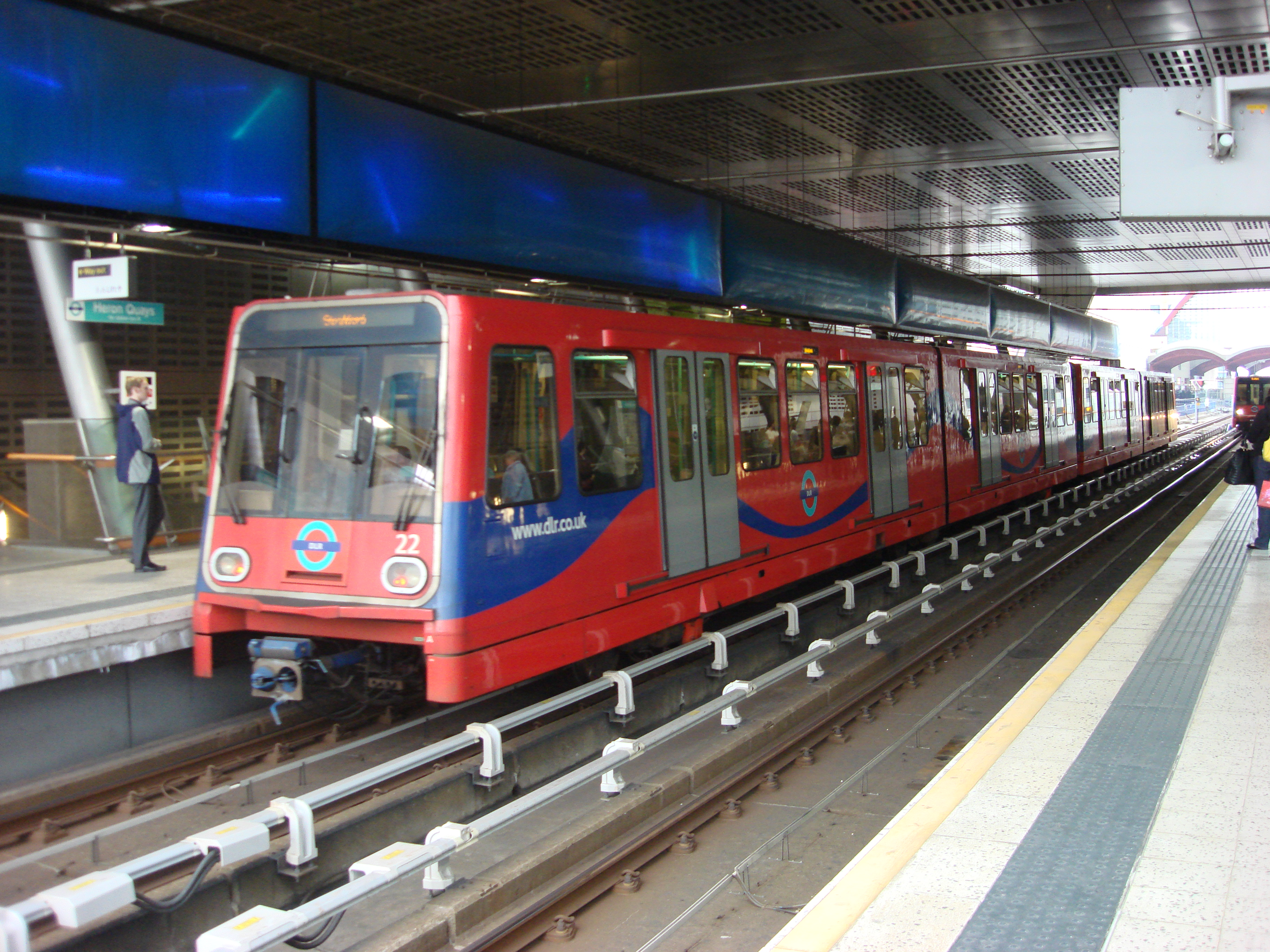
- Train at the northbound platform in 2008

General information
- Location: Heron Quays, Tower Hamlets
- Coordinates: 51.5028°N 0.0213°W
- Owned by: Transport for London
- Managed by: Docklands Light Railway
- Platforms: 2
- Connections: Out-of-station interchange: Canary Wharf

Construction
- Structure type: Elevated
- Accessible: Yes

Other information
- Status: Unstaffed
- Fare zone: 2
- Website: Official website

History
- Opened: 31 August 1987

Key dates
- 2001: Closed for rebuilding
- 18 December 2002: Re-opened

Passengers

DLR annual entry and exit
- 2020: ▼2.309 million
- 2021: ▲3.858 million
- 2022: ▲5.270 million
- 2023: ▲5.940 million
- 2024: ▼5.19 million
Location
- Location in Tower Hamlets

Heron Quays is a light metro station on the Docklands Light Railway (DLR) Bank to Lewisham Line in the Heron Quays area of Canary Wharf in East London.

== History ==
Originally open-air, the station was reconstructed in 2001-2002 (to fit inside a new high-rise development by Morgan Stanley and Lehman Brothers).

== Design ==
Longer platforms were built to accommodate three-unit trains planned as part of the DLR Capacity Enhancement. Designed by Alsop Architects, the station re-opened on 18 December 2002.

== Location ==
The station is situated on the Isle of Dogs and serves the southern part of the Canary Wharf office complex and is directly connected to the Jubilee Place underground shopping centre. The station is elevated and contained within one of the complex's office towers.

The station is in London fare zone 2, and is on the Lewisham branch of the Docklands Light Railway, between Canary Wharf and South Quay.

It has an out of station interchange (OSI) for Canary Wharf Underground station on London Underground's Jubilee line. Through ticketing is allowed between both stations.

London Buses routes 135, D3, D8 and night route N550 serve the station.

== Services ==
The typical off-peak service in trains per hour from Heron Quays is:

- 12 tph to Bank
- 12 tph to Lewisham

Additional services call at the station during the peak hours, increasing the service to up to 22 tph in each direction, with up to 8 tph during the peak hours running to and from Stratford instead of Bank.

Preceding station	DLR	Following station
Canary Wharf towards Bank or Stratford	Docklands Light Railway	South Quay towards Lewisham
