= 25 Bank Street =

Office building in London

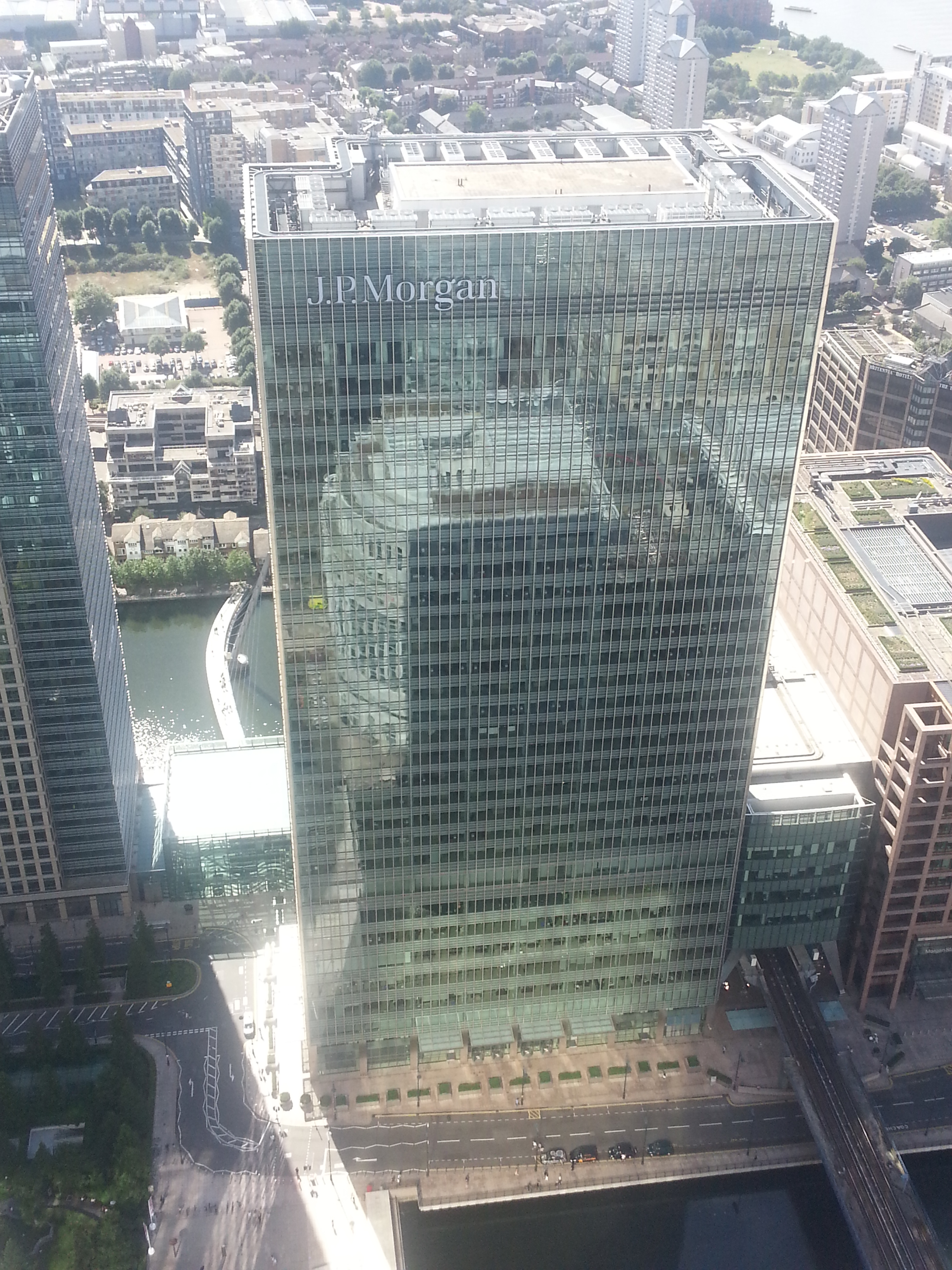
- 25 Bank Street
- Former names: HQ2

General information
- Type: Commercial
- Location: London, E14
- Coordinates: 51°30′10.7″N 00°01′15.7″W
- Construction started: 2001
- Completed: 2002
- Opening: 5 April 2004
- Owner: JPMorgan Chase

Height
- Roof: 153 metres (502 ft)

Technical details
- Floor count: 33
- Floor area: 97,546 m^{2} (1,049,980 sq ft)
- Lifts/elevators: 29

Design and construction
- Architects: Cesar Pelli & Associates, Adamson Associates Architects (as executive architect)
- Developer: Canary Wharf Group
- Structural engineer: Yolles Partnership
- Main contractor: Canary Wharf Contractors

25 Bank Street is an office tower in Canary Wharf, in the Docklands area of London. It is currently home to the European headquarters of the investment bank JPMorgan Chase.

The building was developed in 2001–2002 by Canary Wharf Group as one of five new buildings on its Heron Quays site. The building was designed by architects Cesar Pelli & Associates Architects and built by Canary Wharf Contractors.

Before construction, 25 Bank Street had been earmarked by Canary Wharf Group for occupation by Enron's European subsidiary. This plan was abandoned in 2001, prior to Enron's collapse later that year.

From 2004, 25 Bank Street served as the European headquarters of Lehman Brothers until the bank's insolvency in September 2008.

== History ==
=== Design and development ===
In July 2000, Canary Wharf Group formally announced the development of the 11-acre (45,000 m^{2}) Heron Quays site, on the southern boundary of the Canary Wharf estate. This would involve the construction of five buildings providing a total of 3,300,000 sq ft (310,000 m^{2}) of Grade A office space. During the development phase, the five buildings were designated HQ1 to HQ5, with 25 Bank Street designated as HQ2.

25 Bank Street, along with its neighbours HQ3 (40 Bank Street) and HQ4 (50 Bank Street) were all designed by César Pelli in the International style, featuring complementary external cladding of stainless steel, glass and stone. Adamson Associates Architects served as the shell and core architect. 25 Bank Street and 40 Bank Street, which are of equal height, are conjoined by the West Winter Garden glass enclosed concourse and all provide enclosed access to an underground retail mall. The building is designed around a central concrete core containing elevators, washrooms and services; this is surrounded by office floors with stainless steel and glass curtain walls.

There are 5 basement levels, a ground floor, mezzanine, and a further 32 levels numbered 1 to 33. There is no 13th floor. The lower levels, up to level 8, incorporate large podium areas on the south and west sides. This allows large trading floors to be accommodated, each with a 50,000 sq ft (4,600 m^{2}) floorplate. The south podium incorporates a secondary core.

In July 2000 Enron Europe opened negotiations with Canary Wharf Group to take 130,060 sq m (1.4 m sq ft) of space on the Canary Wharf estate. The HQ1 and HQ2 sites were earmarked for use by Enron in a mixed use development that would include a mini-power station. This development was planned to supplement Enron's Victoria headquarters at 40 Grosvenor Place. The negotiations were discontinued early in 2001, prior to Enron's insolvency later that year.

On 3 April 2001, Canary Wharf Group announced that it had concluded a 30-year lease agreement with Lehman Brothers for the entirety of the space in HQ2, a total of over 1,000,000 sq ft (93,000 m^{2}). Under the terms of the agreement, Canary Wharf Group provided a number of financial incentives to Lehman Brothers, including coverage of fitting out costs up to £35 per sq ft; a further payment of £16 million on drawdown of the lease; and a contribution of £30 per sq ft towards the refitting of 408,000 sq ft (37,900 m^{2}) of office space occupied by Lehman Brothers in Broadgate, City of London.

=== Construction ===
The construction of 25 Bank Street was undertaken by Canary Wharf Contractors, with an overall build time of 32 months. The geography of the site presented considerable access challenges in that it was surrounded by water on three sides, with two thirds of the fourth side in the former dock. A coffer dam was constructed in the dock to enable the water to be pumped out and a road was built on top of the dam, with earth ramps to enable construction traffic to reach the construction site. River traffic was extensively used to minimise road deliveries; consignments of aggregates and structural steel were delivered by barge and a concrete batching plant was constructed on a barge anchored in the dock. At the end of the project the coffer dam was removed and the fill loaded onto barges for removal.

The construction of the rectangular concrete core was subcontracted to Byrne Bros (Formwork) Ltd, who used the PERI ACS self climbing formwork system. This was the first time this system had been used in the UK. By using the jumpform system, the subcontractor was able to use additional work platforms situated below the main work platform, so that multiple phases of work could be undertaken concurrently.

The West Podium of 25 Bank Street is situated at a height of 30 metres (98 ft) above a 100-metre (330 ft) length of the Docklands Light Railway (DLR), including Heron Quays station. To protect the DLR, which continued to operate throughout construction, a concrete slab was installed above the railway that formed the base of the West Podium. This would support the upper floors and also act as an assembly deck during construction operations. The five levels of the West Podium are suspended from transfer trusses at the higher levels.

The building was topped out on 8 November 2002. George Iacobescu, Canary Wharf Group Chief Executive, and Jeremy Isaacs, chief executive of Lehman Brothers for Europe and Asia, both signed the final steel girder before it was hoisted into place. At that time, 25 Bank Street was London's 6th tallest skyscraper.

Elevators engineering was undertaken by Lerch, Bates & Associates, Inc. A specialist lighting arrangement was installed to illuminate the crown of the building. This was designed by LightMatters and involved a total of 5,472 LED fixtures installed between the inner wall and the outer glass shell of the building's 32nd level.

== Occupancy ==
=== Lehman Brothers ===
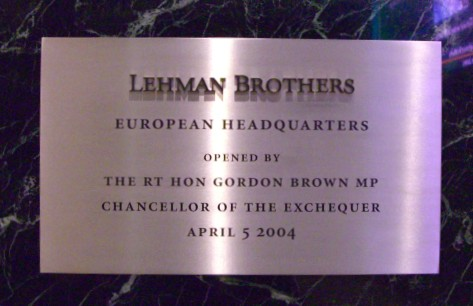
Ceremonial plaque from the opening of 25 Bank Street in 2004. Later, in 2010, this would be auctioned by the Lehman administrators for £28,750

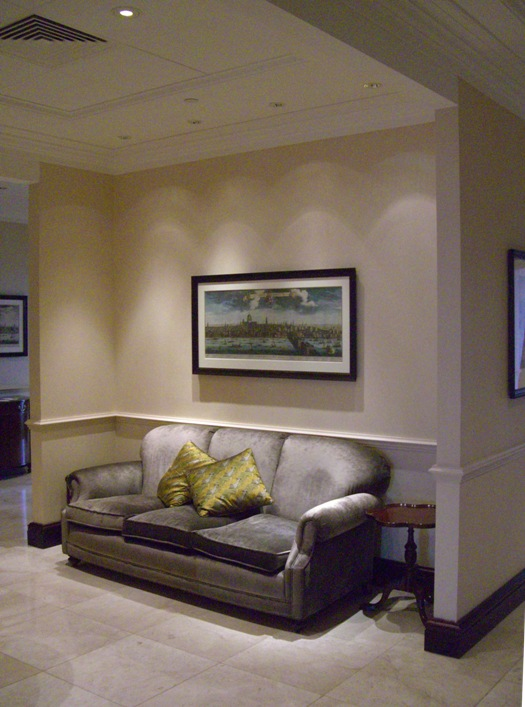
Level 31 at 25 Bank Street was used by Lehman Brothers as a client reception area; it contained meeting rooms and hospitality suites featuring fine art and furnishings.

25 Bank Street served as the headquarters of Lehman Brothers International (Europe) and associated Lehman Brothers entities in Europe. The building was officially opened as Lehman Brothers' European headquarters on 5 April 2004. Gordon Brown, then the UK Chancellor of the Exchequer, officiated at the opening ceremony.

The building's fit out was undertaken by Hilson Moran, who were responsible for both the shell & core services design for Canary Wharf Limited and the fit-out services design for Lehman Brothers. Facilities included a TV broadcast studio, meeting rooms and 400-seat auditorium at level 1; a 3000 sq metre Data Centre at level 2; four trading floors at levels 3 to 6; a Gym & Fitness Centre and staff restaurant at level 7; executive floors at levels 30 and 31; and twenty office floors. Plant floors were located at levels 8, 32 and 33. Swanke Hayden Connell served as the fit-out architect.

Although levels 3-6 were all capable of being used as trading floors, only levels 4 and 5 were fully configured as such during the Lehman occupation.

The staff restaurant, at level 7, was operated by Restaurant Associates, who also provided catering services for corporate events hosted in the building.

The full floor configuration during the Lehman Brothers occupation was:

Floor	Net usable floorspace	Occupants
33	-	Plant floor
32	-	Plant floor
31	26,100 sq ft (2,420 m^{2})	Client hospitality rooms; executive dining room
30	26,100 sq ft (2,420 m^{2})	Executive management
29	26,100 sq ft (2,420 m^{2})	Investment Management Division
28	26,100 sq ft (2,420 m^{2})	Investment Management Division
27	26,100 sq ft (2,420 m^{2})	Investment Banking Division
26	26,100 sq ft (2,420 m^{2})	Investment Banking Division; Corporate Real Estate
25	26,100 sq ft (2,420 m^{2})	Investment Banking Division
24	25,000 sq ft (2,300 m^{2})	Information Technology
23	25,000 sq ft (2,300 m^{2})	Mortgage Capital Division; Fixed Income Real Estate
22	25,000 sq ft (2,300 m^{2})	Legal; Internal Audit; Compliance
18-21	25,400 sq ft (2,360 m^{2})	Sublet to tenants
17	25,400 sq ft (2,360 m^{2})	Unused office space
14-16	25,400 sq ft (2,360 m^{2})	Sublet to tenants
12	24,800 sq ft (2,300 m^{2})	Finance; Operations; Corporate Services
11	24,400 sq ft (2,270 m^{2})	Finance; Operations
10	24,800 sq ft (2,300 m^{2})	Finance; Operations
9	24,800 sq ft (2,300 m^{2})	Fixed Income Division; Mortgage Capital Division
8	-	Plant floor
7	70,300 sq ft (6,530 m^{2})	Staff restaurant; gymnasium; travel; security; print services
6	69,800 sq ft (6,480 m^{2})	Fixed Income, Investment Banking, Corporate Dealing Services and Equities Middle Office
5	69,700 sq ft (6,480 m^{2})	Equities trading floor
4	69,500 sq ft (6,460 m^{2})	Fixed income trading floor
3	47,100 sq ft (4,380 m^{2})	Information Technology
2	48,700 sq ft (4,520 m^{2})	Technical Operations; Data Centre
1	45,600 sq ft (4,240 m^{2})	Human Resources; meeting rooms; services; TV studio and editing suite
Ground	32,600 sq ft (3,030 m^{2})	Reception and entrance lobby; auditorium; meeting rooms

=== Lehman Brothers (in administration) ===
==== Insolvency ====
The cash resources of the Lehman Group were managed centrally in New York by the parent company, Lehman Brothers Holdings Inc. (LBHI). Following a deterioration in LBHI's financial position, on the afternoon of Sunday 14 September 2008, the directors of Lehman Brothers International (Europe) Ltd (LBIE) sought assurances from LBHI that payments due to be made on its behalf on the following business day would be made. At approximately 12.30 am on 15 September, LBHI informed LBIE that it was preparing to file for Chapter 11 Bankruptcy protection under US law and that it was therefore no longer in a position to make payments to or on behalf of LBIE. Accordingly, overnight preparations were made for a number of UK based Lehman companies to protect their interests by seeking an Administration Order under UK law. This order was granted by a UK judge at 7.56 am on Monday 15 September 2008.

==== Ongoing occupation of 25 Bank Street ====
PricewaterhouseCoopers were appointed as administrators of the UK business and as part of this task took over the management of 25 Bank Street. Having arranged the sale of parts of the Lehman business to Nomura International plc, the administrators reached agreement to sub-lease approximately 358,000 sq ft (33,300 m^{2}) in 25 Bank Street to Nomura International. An additional 63,000 sq ft (5,900 m^{2}) of space was sub-let to Nomura in March 2010. These subleases were due to expire in March 2011; in the event, Nomura would exercise a break option in September 2010 and exit the building at that time. A further 126,000 sq ft (11,700 m^{2}) was sub-let to other tenants, including the Financial Services Authority, land agents Jones Lang Wootton and NYSE Euronext.

From 1 January 2010, Lehman Brothers (in administration) reduced its occupation of 25 Bank Street to 290,146 sq ft (26,955.4 m^{2}); and from 31 March of that year exited the building entirely, moving to new premises at 25 Canada Square. The total property, IT and occupancy costs to the Lehman Brothers administration totalled $170 million for the 18-month period from the time of insolvency to the time of the 25 Bank Street exit. The office move resulted in annual cost savings of over $73 million.

=== J.P. Morgan Investment Bank ===
On 20 December 2010 J.P. Morgan announced the acquisition of 25 Bank Street to become the new European headquarters of its Investment Bank in 2012. The purchase price would be £495 million. This was one of several real estate commitments announced by the bank that also included the purchase of 60 Victoria Embankment, a London building that the bank had been leasing since 1991 and which accommodates the firm's Treasury and Securities Services division. J.P. Morgan also announced that it had reached agreement with Canary Wharf Group to fund a further tranche of development to its Riverside South scheme.

The building's postcode was changed to E14 5JP. During the Lehman Brothers occupation it was E14 5LE.

== See also ==
- Canary Wharf
- Tall buildings in London
