= 10 Upper Bank Street =

Skyscraper in Canary Wharf, London, England

Coordinates: 51°30′10″N 0°00′59″W

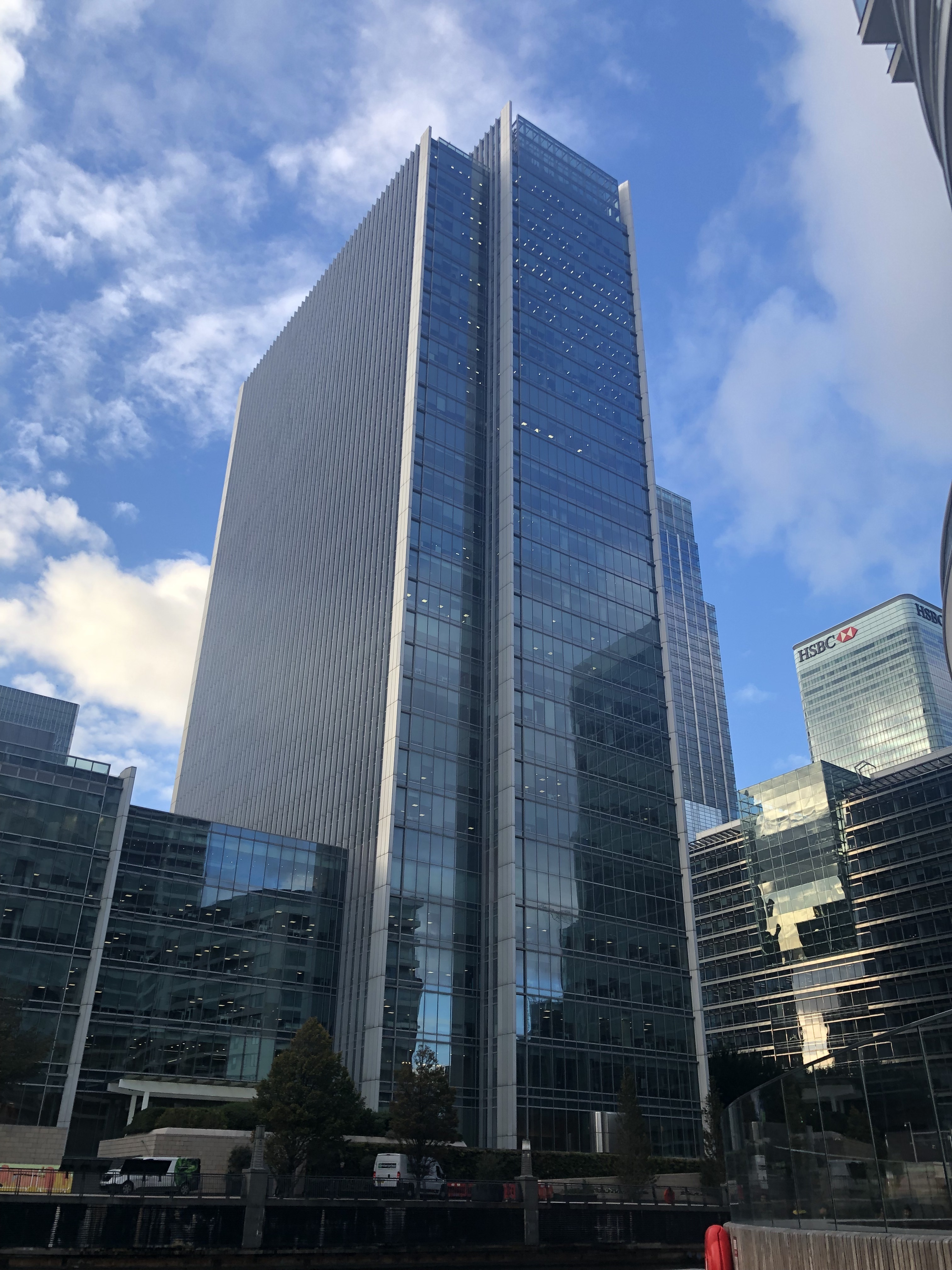
- 10 Upper Bank Street

General information
- Status: Completed
- Type: Office
- Location: Canary Wharf; London, E14; United Kingdom
- Completed: 2003
- Opening: 2003

Height
- Roof: 151 m (495 ft)

Technical details
- Floor count: 32
- Floor area: 92,251 m^{2} (992,981 sq ft)
- Lifts/elevators: 38

Design and construction
- Architect: Kohn Pedersen Fox
- Developer: Canary Wharf Group;China Life Insurance Group
- Structural engineer: M.S. Yolles & Partners
- Main contractor: Cleveland Bridge & Engineering Company

10 Upper Bank Street is a 32-story commercial skyscraper located in the Canary Wharf financial estate. It was completed in 2003 and is 151 m (495 ft) tall.

It was designed by the architect Kohn Pedersen Fox and built by Canary Wharf Contractors.

Most of the building is occupied by the law firm Clifford Chance, though the firm plans to leave the building for new space in The City of London by 2028.

== Tenants ==
- Clifford Chance
- FTSE
- Mastercard UK
- TotalEnergies
- Infosys
- Deutsche Bank
- Loan Market Association
- Van Dyk

== See also ==
- List of tallest buildings and structures in London
