= One Churchill Place =

Building in Canary Wharf, London

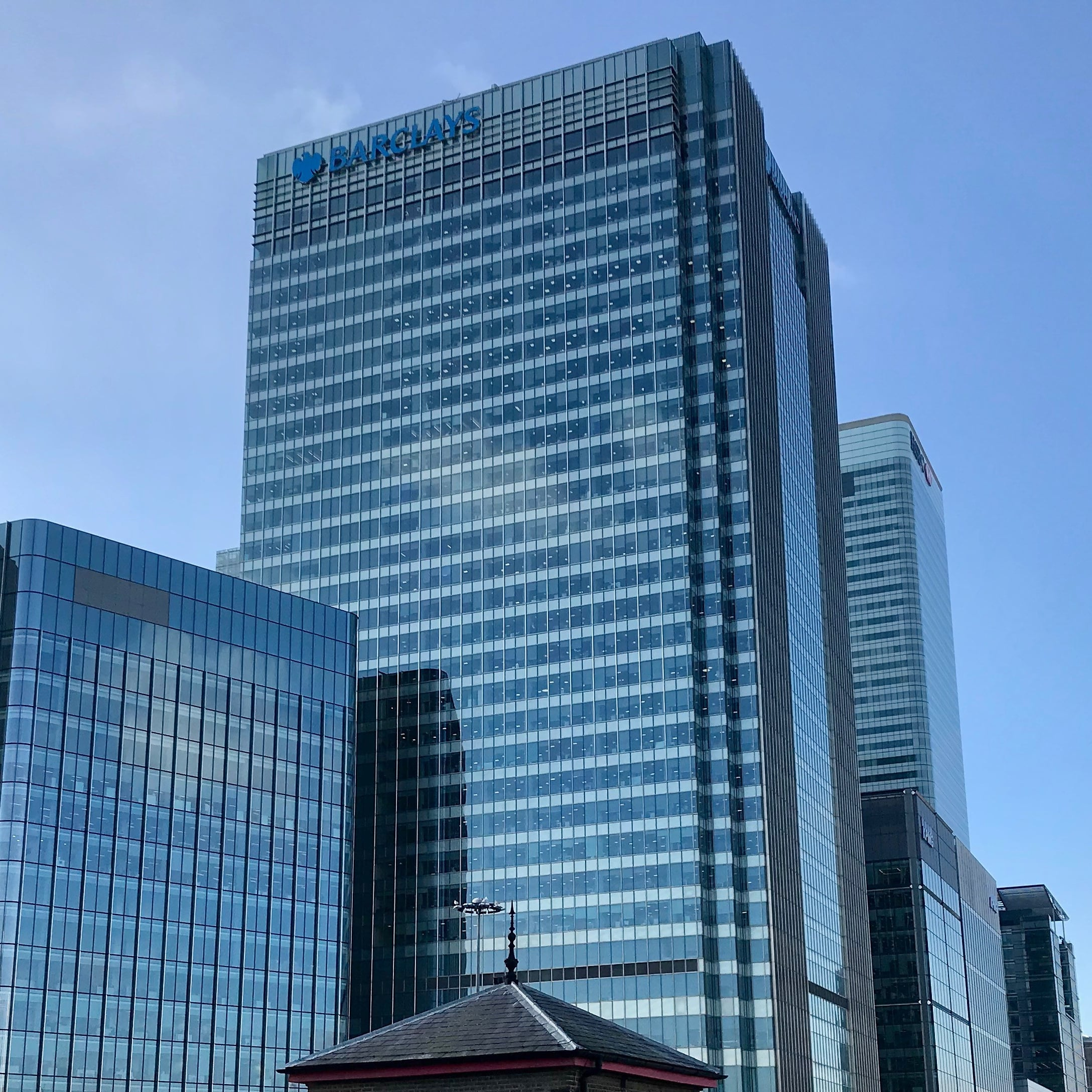
- One Churchill Place
- Interactive map of the One Churchill Place area

General information
- Location: Canary Wharf; London, E14
- Coordinates: 51°30′19″N 00°00′52″W
- Construction started: 2003
- Completed: 2004
- Opening: 2005

Height
- Roof: 156 m (512 ft)

Technical details
- Floor count: 32
- Floor area: 157,164 m^{2} (1,691,700 sq ft)

Design and construction
- Architect: HOK International
- Structural engineer: WSP Cantor Seinuk
- Main contractor: Canary Wharf Contractors

One Churchill Place is a 156-metre-tall (512 ft), 32-storey skyscraper in Canary Wharf and is located in the London Borough of Tower Hamlets, serving as the headquarters of Barclays Bank. The building is the 13th-tallest office block in the United Kingdom and the sixth tallest building in the Docklands.

The building was formally opened in June 2005 by the Chairman of Barclays, Matthew Barrett, and merged Barclays offices across London into one building. The former corporate HQ was at 54 Lombard Street in the City of London.

Barclays occupies 100% of the building; floors 18–20 were previously leased to BGC Partners/Cantor Fitzgerald. Several floors were previously occupied by the Olympic Delivery Teams prior to 2012, and a portion of level 17 was occupied by the Metropolitan Police.

In June 2026, Barclays acquired a 999-year leasehold interest in One Churchill Place from Canary Wharf Group for £750 million. The acquisition gave the bank long-term control of the building and was described as a sign of its continued commitment to Canary Wharf.

== Construction ==
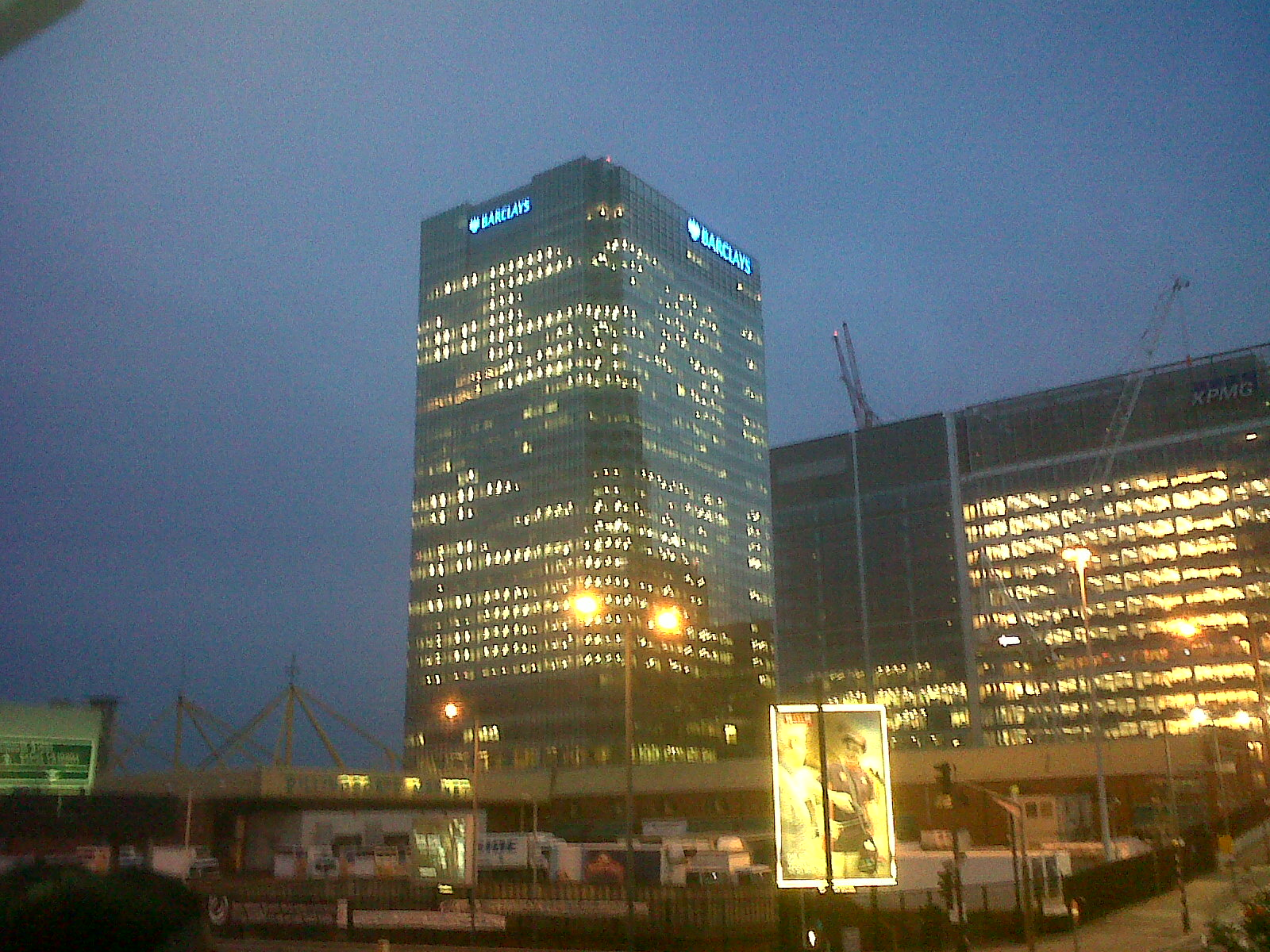
One Churchill Place at night in 2012

The building was designed by HOK International and constructed by Canary Wharf Contractors.

Designed after the 9/11 terrorist attacks, the building is constructed around four staircase columns with a large, central column containing the lifts and toilet facilities. The building manual states that there is enough room in these columns to contain everyone who works in the building, in the event of a security alert.

The building was planned to be 50 storeys in height, but was scaled down to 31 after the 9/11 terrorist attacks.

It is linked by walkways to the Canada Square shopping mall and Canary Wharf Underground station.

== See also ==
- Tall buildings in London
