= Reichmann =

Reichmann or Reichman (Hebrew: רייכמן, Yiddish: רייכמאן) is a German and Yiddish surname. The name means that somebody is a very wealthy (rich) man; (reich = rich and mann = man) in German.

== Notable people ==
Notable people with the surname include:

- Adva Reichman (born 1987), an Israeli writer and director
- Eva Gabriele Reichmann (1897–1998), a German Jewish historian and sociologist
- Frieda Fromm-Reichmann (1889–1957), a German Jewish psychiatrist and psychoanalyst
- Gisela Reichmann, an Austrian figure skater
- Helmut Reichmann (1941–1992), a German glider pilot
- Jean-Luc Reichmann (born 1960), a French radio and television host
- Josh Reichmann, a Canadian indie rock singer-songwriter
- Michael Reichmann (1944–2016), a Canadian photographer and entrepreneur
- Tobias Reichmann (born 1988), a German handball player
- Reichmann family, a Hungarian-Austrian Jewish family best known for owning the Olympia and York company
  - Edward Reichmann (1925–2005; Hebrew: אדוארד רייכמן), an Israeli businessman
  - Albert Reichmann (1929–2022; Hebrew: אלברט רייכמן), a Canadian businessman
  - Paul Reichmann (1930–2013; Hebrew: פול רייכמן), a Canadian businessman

== Reichman ==
- Harry Richman, born Reichman (1895–1972), an American actor, dancer, singer, and comedian
- Marek Reichman (born 1966), an English automotive designer
- Hershel Reichman (born 1944; Hebrew: צבי יוסף רייכמאן), a US Orthodox rabbi
- Uriel Reichman (born 1942; Hebrew: אוריאל רייכמן), an Israeli professor of law, politician, and founder of Reichman University

== See also ==
- Rajchman (Polonised from)
- Richman
- Reich, Rajch, etc.
