= Rechtman (surname) =

Rechtman is a surname commonly used by people of Jewish origin, dating back centuries. Documents show that it existed at least as early as 1750. When shown to exist prior to 1804, this surname predates the requirements that Jews maintain a Patronymic surname under the Napoleonic Code.

Rechtman, Roitman, Rejtman are names found as people murdered in The Holocaust in about 1,500 records

== Patronym variants ==
The surname Rechtman appears in various spelling, depending on the geography of the people using it:

- English: Rechtman, Reijtman, Richman, Reitman
- Hebrew: רייטמן, רקטמן, רוטמן, רכטמן, רעכטמאן,
- Russian: Рехтман
- Polish: Rechtmana, Rajchman

== Priestly (Cohen) connection ==
Many descendants who have the surname Rechtman believe that they are descendants of a Jewish priestly family (Hebrew: כּוֹהֵן, Biblical Hebrew כהן, English: Kohen, or Cohen or כ"ץ, the acronym for כהן צדק, translated "Righteous Priest"). This belief is supported by Jews of Rechtman descendants to mark their documents with the postfix "the Cohen" (Hebrew: HaCohen), or mark their grave with the iconic symbol of the priestly benediction of the parsed or touching hands (see photos). Because in Judaism priestly descendancy and patronyms both follow through the father, it is reasonable to expect that over time surnames and priestly descendance are retained for Jewish men.

The Root of the name Rightman is traced to the Priestly divisions (Hebrew:משמרות כהונה) whereby the 6th priestly division was Mijamin (Hebrew: מִיָּמִ֖ן translated: Lit. "of the Right" proverbial: "Of the East[ern]")

=== Documentary Evidence for Connection ===
Jews continued to document their priestly status through patronymic references, which were preserved on tombstones (or headstones), and other Jewish documents such as Ketuba:

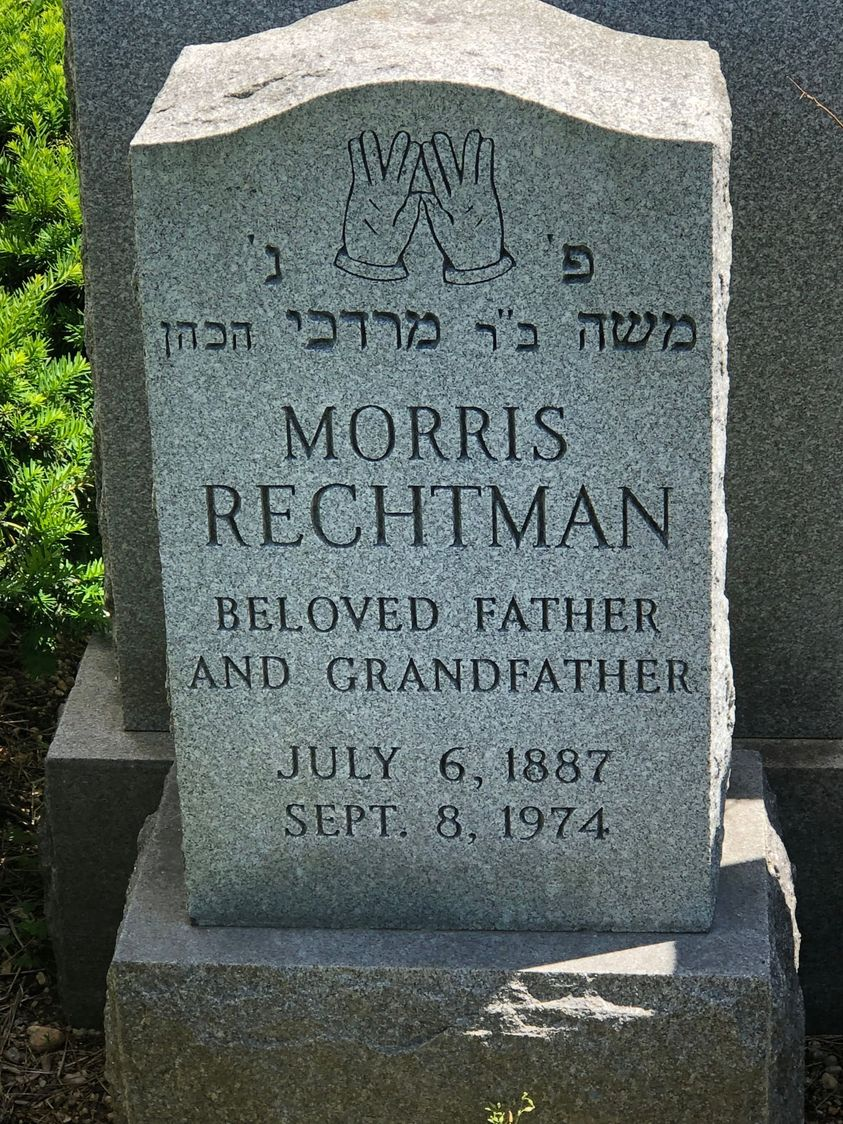
A grave market showing explicit connection to the Jewish priestly family and implicit iconography. Hebrew: "Here lies <icon> Moshe son of Mordechai The Cohen"

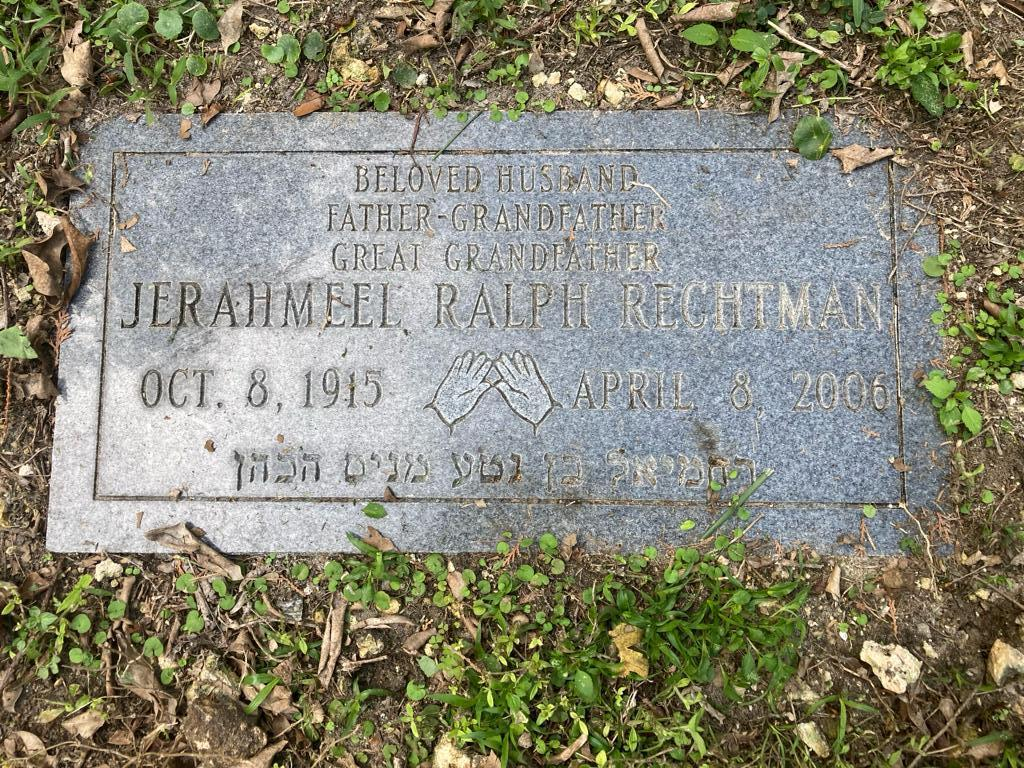
A grave marker of a Rechtman with the priestly and references to Rechtman being a כּהֵן and parsed hands priestly iconography

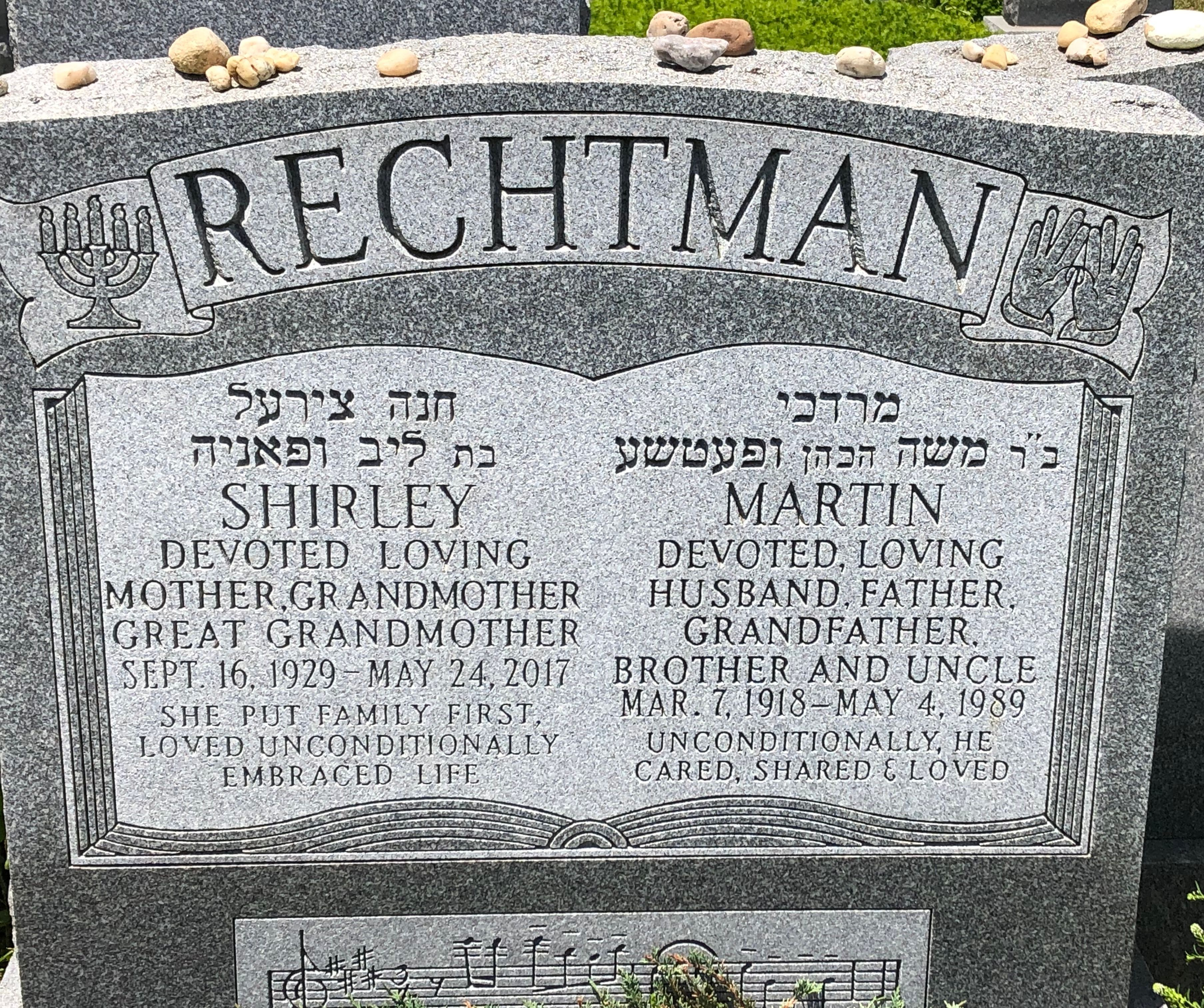
A grave marker of a Rechtman with the priestly כּהֵן iconography

== Notable persons ==
- Aleksander Rajchman (1890-1940), Polish mathematician
- Ilan Rechtman (born 1963), Israeli pianist, composer and music director.
- Jan A. Rajchman (1911-1989), Polish-American electrical engineer and computer pioneer
- John Rajchman (born 1946), American philosopher of art history, architecture, and continental philosophy
- Ludwik Rajchman (1881-1965), Polish bacteriologist and one of the founders of UNICEF
- Karyn Rachtman (born 1964), American music supervisor and film producer
- Mordechai Rechtman (1926-2023), Israeli bassoonist, conductor, academic teacher and arranger
- Riki Rachtman, American television and radio personality
- Shmuel Rechtman (1924-1988), Israeli politician who served as mayor of Rehovot from 1970 until 1979
- יעקב צדקוני Yaakov Tzidkoni (Rechtman) (1902-1973), Israeli ethnographer
