= Reichmann family =

Jewish Canadian family

Reichmann family משפחת רייכמן
- Country: Canada
- Place of origin: Beled, Hungary
- Members: Edward Reichmann; Albert Reichmann; Paul Reichmann
- Properties: Reichmann International Development, Olympia and York, Canary Wharf

The Reichmann family (Hebrew: משפחת רייכמן) is a Jewish-Canadian family best known for their property empire built through the Olympia and York company.

At the family's peak, their combined wealth was estimated at $13 billion making them the fourth-richest family in the world. The family's fortunes eventually waned, particularly with the ill-fated Canary Wharf development, which saw the family business file for bankruptcy in 1992 with debts of $20 billion. The family's wealth partially recovered, reaching roughly $2.3 billion in 2018.

== History ==
The Reichman(n)s were originally from the small town of Beled, Hungary, but the ambitious Samuel Reichmann moved the family to Vienna, Austria, in 1928 where he became a successful merchant. He and his wife Renée had six children:

- Eva Reichmann (married name Heller; 1923–1984)
- Edward Reichmann (1925–2005)
- Louis Reichmann (1927–2005)
- Albert Reichmann (1929–2022)
- Paul Reichmann (1930–2013)
- Ralph Reichmann (b. 1933)

During the Second World War, the family fled first to Paris, France, and then to the neutral city of Tangier, Morocco, in the 1950s. There, Samuel became a prominent business leader specializing in the currency trade. Renée became a renowned humanitarian aiding victims of the Holocaust, arranging food parcels to be delivered through the Spanish Red Cross to concentration camps such as Theresienstadt and Auschwitz-Birkenau.

Although they thrived in Tangier, the family left to avoid the turbulence of Moroccan independence. Eva moved to London, and Edward went to Montreal, where in 1955, he founded Olympia Flooring and Tile Company to import European tiles. The success of the company, along with the country's large Jewish population, soon brought the rest of the family to Canada in 1956.

Louis joined Edward in Montreal while Albert, Paul, and Ralph settled in Toronto, where they first expanded Edward's tile business but then moved into construction and property development. Samuel was the leader of this business that became known as York Developments. Albert and Paul played a secondary but central role, while Ralph remained in charge of the tile business. In the late 1960s, Edward's Montreal business was faltering and on the verge of collapse. He was only saved from ruin by a bail-out from his younger brothers in Toronto. Embarrassed at this turn of events Edward left Canada for Israel.

In 1969, the family incorporated Olympia & York (O&Y), a privately-held real-estate company entirely controlled by the family; in 1976, the company began operations in the US.

Over time, through successful projects in Toronto and New York, O&Y became the largest property development and management firm in the world in the 1980s, and the Reichmanns one of the world's richest families. (At the family's peak, their combined wealth was estimated at $13bn, making them the fourth-richest family on the planet.) Holdings of O&Y included First Canadian Place, the World Financial Centre in Manhattan, and Canary Wharf in London. In 1980, they bought English Property Corp, one of the largest British developers. In 1981, they bought Abitibi-Price Inc, the world's largest newspaper producer, for $502 million; and in 1985, they acquired the majority interest in Gulf Canada Resources, in the second-largest takeover in Canadian history.

Throughout this time, the family remained strongly committed to their Haredi Judaism.

In the early 1990s, the business empire and family's fortune was brought low by the Canary Wharf project in London. In 1987, British Prime Minister Margaret Thatcher, who had seen the transformation of the World Financial Centre, enlisted Paul to transform the docklands of Canary Wharf into a financial powerhouse. This project proved catastrophic, as banks were reluctant to move three miles east of the City of London. By 1992, O&Y declared bankruptcy in the biggest corporate failure of all time—with debts of $20bn—and the Reichmann fortune was greatly reduced.

In 1997, Albert's son Philip Reichmann and Paul’s son-in-law Frank Hauer relaunched the company as O&Y Properties Inc. and bought back First Canadian Place. Reichmann and Hauer sold their company in 2005. Since then, the family has continued to be involved in tiles and stone, retirement care, and real-estate development deals around the world.

In 2019, descendants of the family donated US $5 million to the Tangier Holocaust Memorial.

== Family tree ==
- Samuel Reichmann (1898 – 1975), m. Renée
  - Eva Reichmann Heller (1923 – 1984)
  - Edward Reichmann (1925, Beled, Hungary – July 2005, Israel)
  - Louis Reichmann (b. May 5, 1927, Beled, Hungary – May 25, 2005), m. 1951 to Marika (b. 1933, Békéscsaba, Hungary)
    - Charles Reichmann
    - Andre Reichmann
    - Golda Gross
  - Albert Reichmann (1929, Vienna, Austria – December 17, 2022, Toronto, Canada)
    - Philip Reichmann
    - David Reichmann
    - Bernice Koenig
    - Libby Gross c.
  - Paul Reichmann (September 27, 1930, Vienna, Austria – October 25, 2013, Toronto, Canada), m. 1955–2013 to Lea Feldman
    - Rachel Reichmann, m. Frank Hauer
    - Barry Reichmann
    - Libby Reichmann
    - Vivian Reichmann
    - Henry Reichmann
  - Ralph Reichmann (b. 1933, Austria)
    - Abraham Reichmann

c.

== See also ==
- Reichmann
- Oberlander Jews
