= Zak Muscovitch =

Canadian intellectual property lawyer (born 1971)

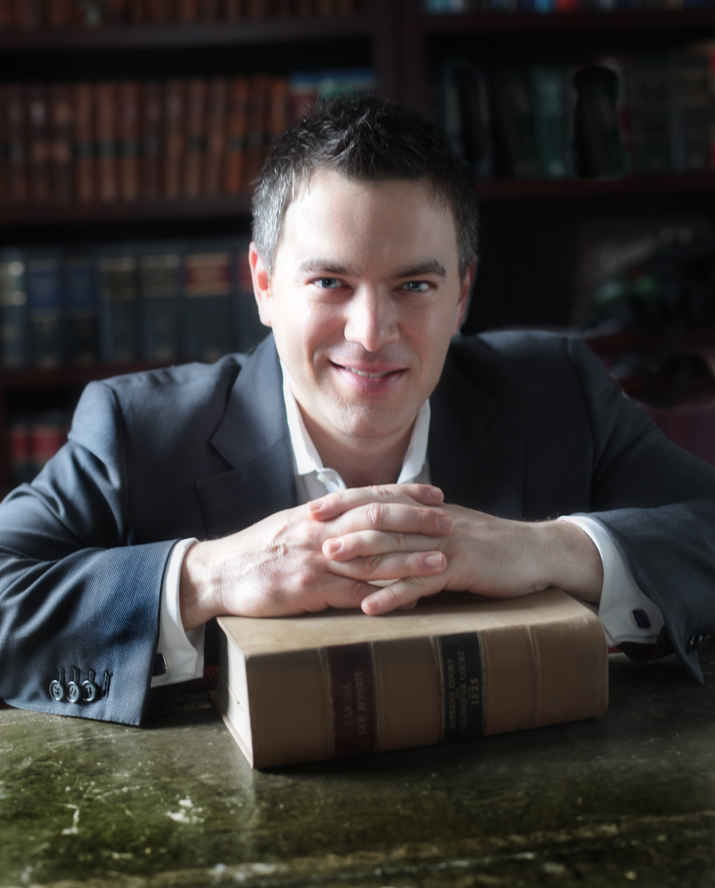
- Born: August 5, 1971 (age 54)
- Citizenship: Canadian
- Education: BA and LLB
- Alma mater: University of Western Ontario and Osgoode Hall Law School
- Occupation: Lawyer
- Employer(s): DNattorney and Muscovitch Law Firm
- Known for: His work in Canadian Domain Name law and as Founder of the Domain Name Law Reports

Zak Muscovitch (/ˈmʌskəvɪtʃ/ MUSS-kə-vitch) is a Canadian intellectual property lawyer. He is the founder of Domain Name Law Reports and has represented clients before domain name arbitrations in cases against companies like Google, Torstar, and Molson.

== Legal practice ==
In 2000 he successfully defended the owners of the website Toronto2.com against Torstar and BellActimedia Inc, operators of the Toronto Star and its website Toronto.com, in the Federal Court of Canada. He also represented clients against a Reichmann family owned business in a dispute over the overextension of the US Anti-Cybersquatting Consumer Protection Act into Canada, arguing that it should not be in force when all litigants were Canadians. In 2002 Muscovitch then successfully represented website developer Douglas Black against Molson after Molson claimed that it had exclusive rights in the domain name, Canadian.biz, as a result of its trademark in the Molson Canadian beer brand of beer. Black v. Molson Canada was the first Canadian legal precedent to overturn a domain name arbitration in Canada.

In 2009 Muscovitch successfully argued against Google on behalf of Groovle. At that point this was one of only two arbitrations lost by Google in its company history. He has also been involved in defending and advising companies regarding ".ca" domain names, setting several legal precedents in Canadian domain and Internet law. Since that case, Muscovitch has successfully represented two additional clients in domain name arbitration cases against Google, including Goggle.com and Oogle.com.

In 2009 Muscovitch also represented Netego DotCom successfully against key companies belonging to billionaire Li Ka-shing before a World Intellectual Property Organization dispute adjudication panel, which resulted in the Panel declaring that this was a case of "Reverse Domain Name Hijacking". Muscovitch has explained that almost all cases regarding major domain names, including those he works on, end up in alternative dispute resolution instead of the court system.

== Media and publishing ==
He has been interviewed regarding technology, domain and Internet law cases of national interest. Muscovitch was the founder and publisher of Domain Name Law Reports - a volunteer organization that helped lawyers research Uniform Domain-Name Dispute-Resolution Policy and cases. Muscovitch has also released several studies. In 2010 he published a study of the case distribution among the panelists at National Arbitration Forum. The results showed that there were deep inconsistencies in both the number of cases a panelist may hear, but also in terms of their likelihood to rule in favour of the complainant. In 2012 he published a study that showed that there were seven panelists, out of the possible 136, that ruled on almost 50% of all decisions.
