= Groovle =

Defunct web search site

- Website type: web search
- Owner: Media 207
- Website: www.groovle.com
- Commercial: Yes
- Current status: Inactive

Groovle was a web search site which offered customers the ability to customise their home page. The underlying service was provided by Google but the company was owned and operated entirely independently.

In December 2009, Google lost a court case in which they claimed that the groovle domain was too similar to its own and control should be passed over to them. Zak Muscovitch, the attorney for Groovle, stated after the case that, "Most people use Google, most people appreciate Google, most people love Google ... but I think most people appreciate when the little guy takes on the giant - and wins."
