= Paul Reichmann =

Canadian businessman (1930–2013)

- משה יוסף רייכמן
- Born: 27 September 1930; Vienna, Austria
- Died: 25 October 2013 (aged 83); Toronto, Ontario, Canada
- Occupation: Businessman
- Known for: Founder of Olympia & York
- Spouse: Lea Feldman (m. 1955)
- Relatives: Reichmann family: Albert Reichmann (brother); Edward Reichmann (brother)

Paul (Moshe Yosef) Reichmann (Hebrew: משה יוסף רייכמן; 27 September 1930 – 25 October 2013) was a Canadian businessman and member of the Reichmann family. He is best known for his leadership of the Olympia & York real estate development company.

== Formative years ==
Reichmann was born in Vienna in 1930 to Samuel Reichmann, a poultry farmer, and his wife Renée. His parents were Orthodox Jews from the small Hungarian town of Beled, but his father had risen to prominence in Vienna as a successful merchant. Paul was the fifth of six children.

The family escaped the Nazi occupation of Austria unintentionally. They had left the country on the day of Anschluss to visit Samuel's father in Hungary who had suffered a stroke. Abandoning their lives in Vienna, they made their way from Hungary to the neutral Moroccan city of Tangier In Tangier, the family prospered as Samuel became a major currency trader. After the war Paul left home to study Judaism first in Britain and then in Israel, and his parents hoped that he would become a teacher. In 1955 he married Lea Feldman.

== Rising success ==
In 1956, Reichmann followed his family to Canada, where three of his brothers—Edward, Louis and Ralph—had established the Olympia Floor & Wall Tile Co, and his brother, Albert, had launched York Factory Developments.

Reichmann fell into property after building a new warehouse for the Toronto tile company. He got the warehouse built for $70,000, selling a year later for a $34,000 profit. He co-founded Olympia & York with his brothers Albert and Ralph in 1958.

Soon the company was building such facilities for others. In 1964, Olympia and York was founded as a separate building and property development firm.

The firm was soon profitable, and expanded rapidly. It also accepted difficult projects, including the construction of First Canadian Place, Canada's tallest building, built in 1975. The company expanded to New York City and by the mid-1980s it was the largest developer in the world, and Forbes magazine ranked them the fourth richest family in the world in 1991, worth $12.8bn.

Paul Reichmann lived relatively modestly, residing in a comfortable home in Toronto, and driving an old Cadillac. He remained private and unwilling to talk to the press. He retained his religious views, and used much of his fortune to support them. In Toronto he built a number of schools and synagogues which became the center for the Orthodox community. He was also a collector of rare Jewish texts. Pursuant to Jewish law, all of Olympia and York's construction projects halted on the Jewish Sabbath and all holy days.

== Troubles ==
The company ran into severe trouble in the early 1990s. It was due in part to a general decline in the world economy, but the company was truly brought low by the Canary Wharf project. It was the world's largest property development, but remained half empty. Reichmann had taken the project as a major gamble. He had been impressed by Margaret Thatcher's reforms and obtained a personal promise from her that she would help the project, most importantly by extending the London Underground to reach it.

In Canada, Reichmann's once sterling reputation also began to suffer. In 1985 the company had bought Gulf Canada Resources in a deal that included some $300 million in tax breaks. Many Canadians were infuriated that a massive corporation had been given such a lucrative deal. Toronto Life magazine also published a highly critical article on the Reichmanns. The family took offence at allegations that Samuel Reichmann had aided the Nazis with illegal smuggling operations during the Second World War. The family sued the magazine for an unprecedented $102 million. They were successful, and Toronto Life published a full retraction.

In 1992, as Olympia and York collapsed under some $20 billion in debt, Reichmann lost most of his family fortune.

== Recovery and retirement ==
Despite these setbacks, Reichmann successfully rebuilt a small portion of his empire. This included setting up a partnership with George Soros, Lawrence Tisch and Michael Price.

Along with investors such as Al-Waleed bin Talal, a consortium paid $1.2 billion for a controlling stake in Canary Wharf, from a third party in charge of the property's administration. Reichmann was hired as chairman. As Sandy Weill stated, Reichmann was hired because, he "...really came up with that whole concept and built it, and got overleveraged and lost it...he knew where every screw was, where every nail was, he knew and loved the operation better than anyone else..." Canary Wharf went public in 1999.

During 2004, a takeover battle began for the Canary Wharf Group in which Reichmann eventually sided with Canadian developer Brascan to attempt a purchase of the company. During this process, he resigned his position on the Board. In March 2005, a consortium of investors led by Morgan Stanley under the banner of Songbird Estates purchased Canary Wharf Group, and Reichmann was therefore no longer involved with Canary Wharf on a day-to-day basis. Reichmann, at the time 75, announced that he intended to retire from business and sold many of his property holdings.

== Return to business activity ==
In September 2006, Reichmann announced that he was bored with retirement and that he would be setting up a new $4 billion fund, based in Toronto, with offices in Great Britain and the Netherlands.

== Death ==
Paul Reichmann died at the age of 83 in Toronto on 25 October 2013. His funeral took place Saturday night, 26 October 2013, at the Bais Yaakov Elementary School (15 Saranac Boulevard), in Toronto. He was buried in Jerusalem, in Har Hamenuchot cemetery.

== See also ==
- Canadians of Hungarian ancestry
