= Rajchman =

Rajchman is a surname; it is a Polish respelling of the German Reichmann, typically used by Jews in Congress Poland, while those in Galicia and Prussian Poland were more likely to use the original German spelling. Notable people with the surname include:

- Aleksander Rajchman (1890–1940), Polish mathematician
- Camila Rajchman (born 1994), Uruguayan singer and television personality
- Chil Rajchman (1914–2004), Polish-Uruguayan Holocaust survivor
- Jan A. Rajchman (1911–1989), Polish-American electrical engineer and computer pioneer
- John Rajchman (born 1946), American philosopher of art history, architecture, and continental philosophy
- Ludwik Rajchman (1881–1965), Polish bacteriologist and one of the founders of UNICEF

== See also ==
- Reichmann
- Richman
