= Olympia Centre =

Skyscraper in Chicago, Illinois

Coordinates: 41.8965°N 87.6233°W

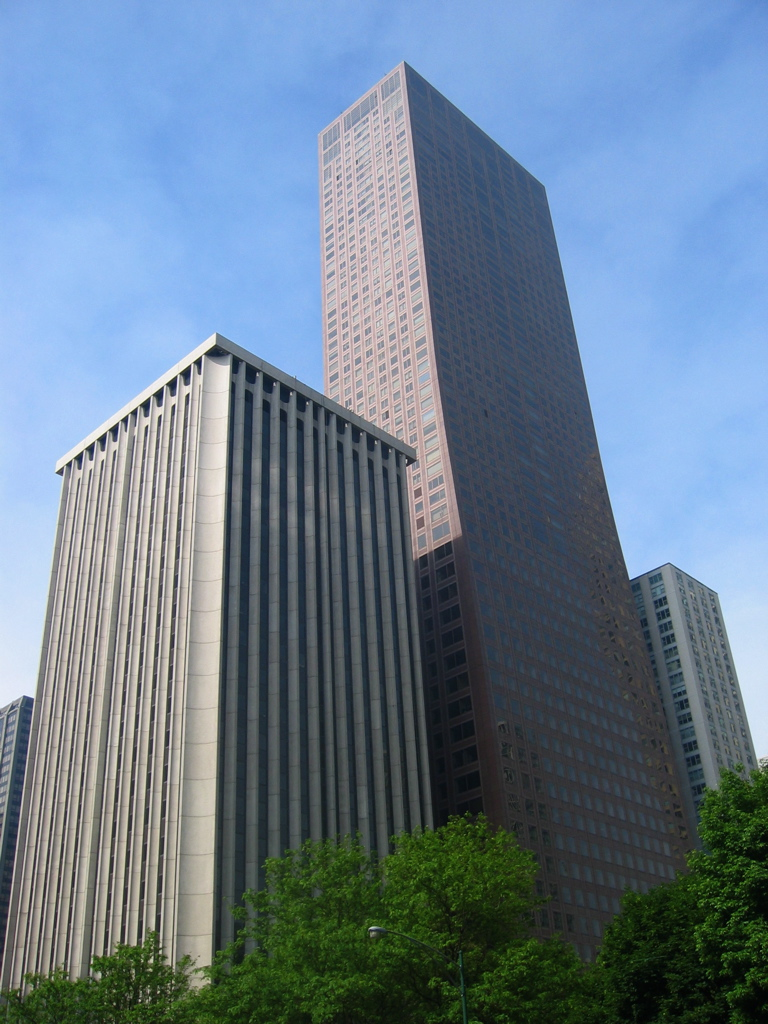
- The Olympia Centre
- Interactive map of the Olympia Centre area

General information
- Status: Completed
- Type: Mixed-use
- Location: 161 East Chicago Avenue; Chicago, Illinois, United States
- Construction started: 1981
- Completed: 1986

Height
- Architectural: 222.9 m (731 ft)
- Top floor: 214.8 m (705 ft)

Technical details
- Floor count: 63
- Floor area: 131,921 m^{2} (1,419,990 sq ft)

Design and construction
- Architect: Skidmore, Owings & Merrill

Other information
- Parking: 430

The Olympia Centre is a skyscraper in Chicago. It is a mixed use building consisting of offices in the lower part of the building and residences in the narrower upper section. It was designed by Skidmore, Owings & Merrill, and at 725 ft (221 m) tall, with 63 floors, it is Chicago's tallest mid-block building. The exterior is Swedish granite, which was finished in Italy. Construction started in 1981, and was completed in 1986. The building's name is connected through the original developer, Olympia and York of Toronto.

The building is divided into three zones: a retail zone occupied by Neiman Marcus, commercial office space from floors 6 through 23, and private condominium residences from floors 24 through 63.

Weissbluth Pediatrics is located in Suite 820 in the Olympia Centre and is the only pediatric practice in the city of Chicago performing house call visits for its families.

The Consulate-General of Japan in Chicago (在シカゴ日本国総領事館 Zai Shikago Nippon-koku Sōryōjikan) is located in Suite 1100 in the Olympia Centre.

== See also ==
- List of buildings
- List of skyscrapers
- List of tallest buildings in Chicago
- List of tallest buildings in the United States
- World's tallest structures

== Position in Chicago's skyline ==
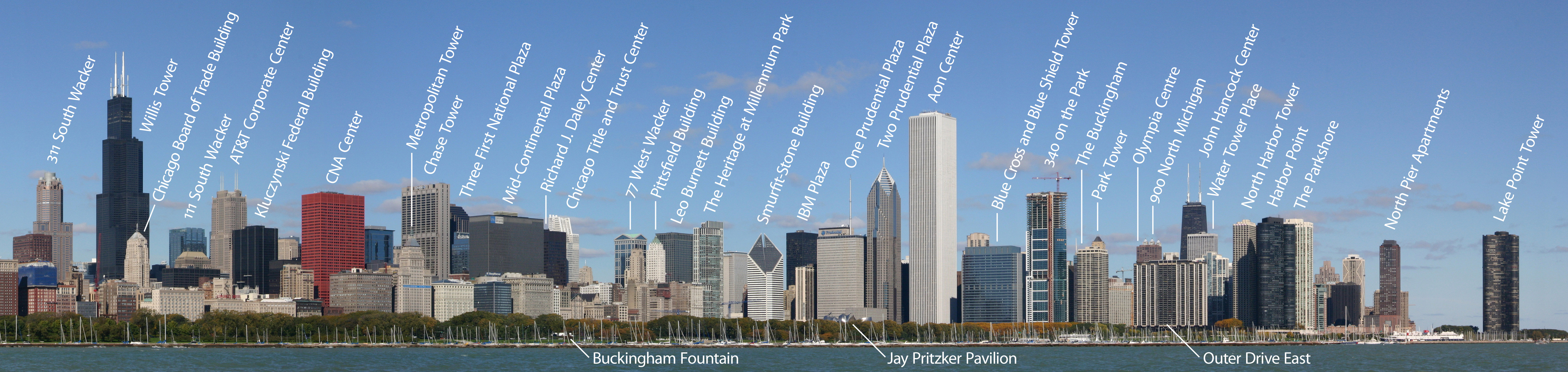
