= Edward Reichmann =

Israeli businessman (1925–2005)

- אדוארד רייכמן
- Born: 1925
- Died: 1 July 2005 (aged 79–80)
- Occupation: Businessman
- Known for: Eldest of the Reichmann brothers, property development

Edward Reichmann (Hebrew: אדוארד רייכמן; 1925 – July 2005) was an Israeli businessman. He was the oldest of the five Reichmann brothers, famed for their global business empire.

He was born to Samuel Reichmann, a wealthy Vienna merchant of Hungarian origin from Beled. The family was lucky to escape Austria before the Nazi invasion leaving the country on the morning of the Anschluss to tend to Edward's grandfather David who had suffered a stroke. From Hungary the family made its way to Paris and then the neutral city of Tangier where Samuel established a successful business in currency trading.

Reichmann was the first of the Reichmanns to emigrate to Canada. He liked Canada, being attracted by Montreal's large Jewish community and favourable economic prospects. In Montreal, he joined with his brother Louis to found Olympia Flooring and Tile, a company that imported tiles from overseas. The business was a success. When Edward's three younger brothers Paul, Albert, and Ralph moved to Canada, he convinced them to settle in Toronto and open a branch of the tile company there.

In Toronto, Edward's three brothers quickly moved into building and property development. Edward, seeing their success, also moved into this industry. He put much energy into building connections with the city's political elite, including becoming a close associate of mayor Jean Drapeau.

Despite a number of major projects, Edward Reichmann's construction ventures did not prosper. Nearing bankruptcy, the company only survived through a massive bailout by his Toronto-based brothers. Edward felt embarrassed at having to be rescued by his younger brothers and left Canada for Israel. There, he again turned to property development, rising to become Israel's fifteenth richest man. These ventures were largely unaffected by the collapse of his brothers' Olympia and York company.
