= Richman =

Richman is a surname. Notable people with the surname include:

- Adam Richman (born 1974), American actor and TV host
- Adam Richman (singer) (born c.1983), American indie pop singer-songwriter
- Alfred A. Richman (c.1892–1984), American orthopedic surgeon
- Boomie Richman (1921–2016), American saxophone player
- Caryn Richman (born 1956), American actress
- Chaim Richman, rabbi in Israel
- Charles Richman (actor) (1865–1940), American film actor
- Charles Richman (commissioner), American community affairs worker
- Daniel Richman, American attorney and professor
- David Richman (born 1978), American basketball head coach
- Douglas Richman (born 1943), American medical virologist
- Frank Richman (1881–1956), Justice of the Indiana Supreme Court
- Harry Richman (1895–1972), American entertainer
- Ike Richman (1913–1965), American attorney and sports executive
- Jeffrey Richman, American writer, producer and actor
- John Henry Richman (1791–1864), South Australian lawyer
- Jonathan Richman (born 1951), American indie musician
- Josh Richman (born 1965), American actor and director
- Keith Richman, American politician from California
- Larry L. Richman (born 1955), American author on project management and social media strategist
- Mason Richman (born 2002), American football player
- Peter Mark Richman (1927–2021), American actor
- Simon Richman (born 1990), English footballer
- Tommy Richman (born 2000), American rapper

== See also ==
- Richman (series), a computer board game series
- Reichmann
- Richmond (surname)
