= Mordechai Rechtman =

Israeli bassoonist (1926–2023)

- מרדכי רכטמן
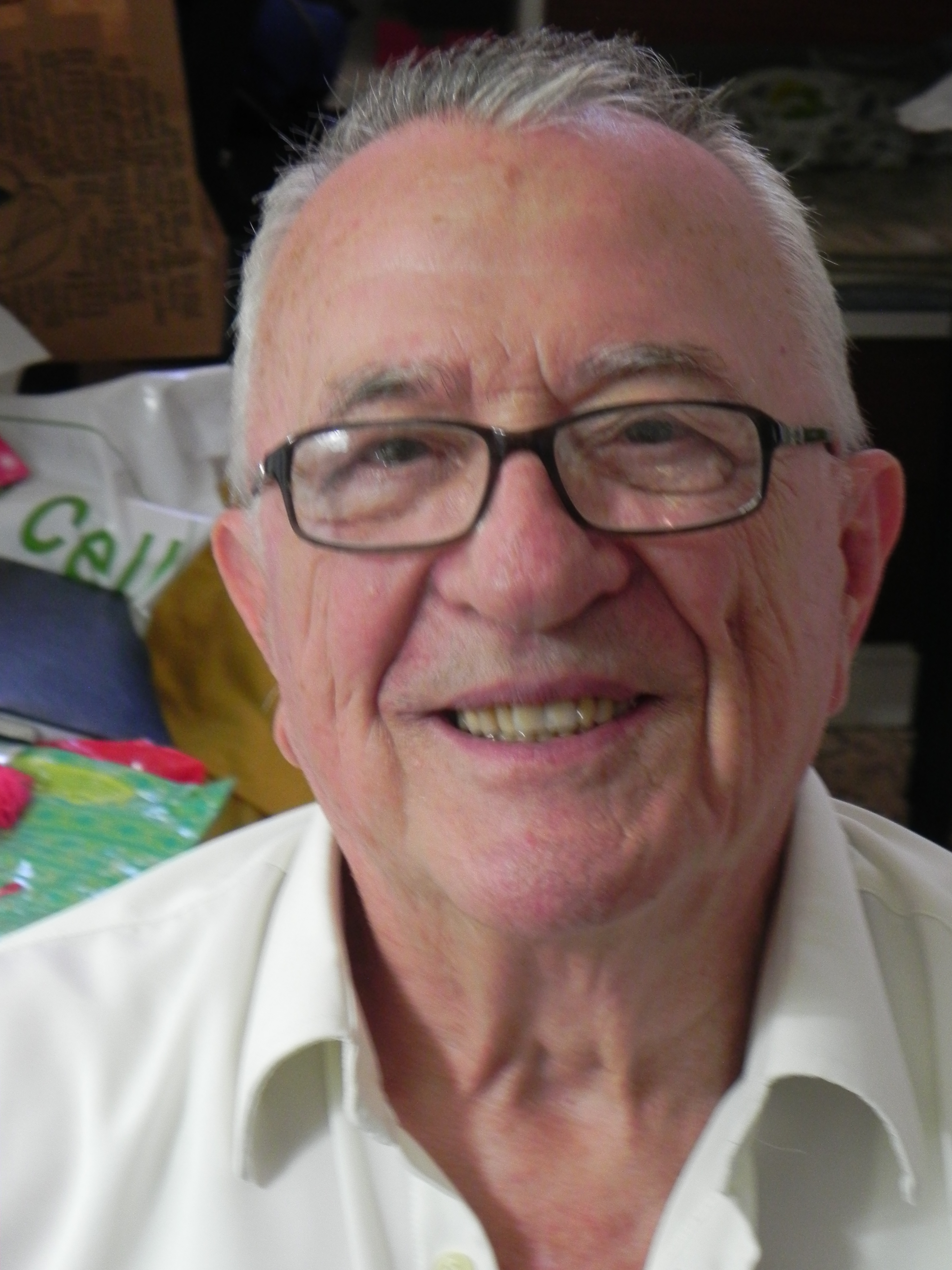
- Rechtman in 2011
- Born: 16 May 1926; Barmen, Rhine Province, Prussia, Germany (Weimar Republic)
- Died: 27 May 2023 (aged 97); Tel Aviv, Israel
- Occupations: Bassoonist; conductor; arranger; academic teacher
- Organizations: Israel Philharmonic Orchestra; Rechtman Concerto Reductions; Tel Aviv University
- Children: 2, including Ilan
- Website: rechtmanmusic.com

Mordechai Rechtman (Hebrew: מרדכי רכטמן; 16 May 1926 – 27 May 2023) was an Israeli bassoonist, conductor, academic teacher and arranger. He was principal bassoonist of the Israel Philharmonic Orchestra from 1946 to 1991. He was professor of bassoon at the Tel Aviv University from 1968 to 2002, and taught as a guest professor internationally, including the Indiana University School of Music, the Juilliard School and the Royal Academy of Music. Rechtman was also known for transcriptions and arrangements for wind quintets and other ensembles that he had founded and conducted, specifically of concertos.

== Life and career ==
Rechtman was born in Barmen, German Reich (now part of Wuppertal, Germany) on 16 May 1926. He immigrated to Mandatory Palestine with his parents in 1934. A neighbour noticed his musicality when he practiced recorder and harmonica on a balcony, and recommended to try the bassoon. Rechtman began playing the bassoon at age 12.

=== Music career ===
In 1941, at age 15, Rechtman became principal bassoonist of the Palestine Opera Orchestra, and from 1946 in the same function in the Philharmonic Orchestra (later the Israel Philharmonic Orchestra, IPO). In 1948, he was in the small ensemble from the orchestra that played Hatikva, the Israeli national anthem, at the signing ceremony of the Israeli Declaration of Independence. He was drafted into the Israel Defense Forces the following day, where he performed for soldiers. He remembered that they "appeared in front of wounded soldiers in hospitals and camps. We played the whole repertoire – Haydn, Mozart, Beethoven and Bach. The soldiers, who were 18, 19 and 20 years old, kept asking for more."

He was awarded first prize at the 1947 Prague Festival. He appeared as a soloist with the Israel Philharmonic Orchestra and other orchestras in Israel and abroad, and in music festivals, such as Tanglewood, Festival dei Due Mondi in Spoleto, Marlboro and the Pablo Casals Music Festival in Puerto Rico. He founded the Israel Woodwind Quintet in 1963 and the Philharmonic Woodwind Ensemble in 1976, serving as its music director and conductor. In 1971, he was the only Israeli representative selected by Arthur Fiedler to join the World Symphony Orchestra which performed at the opening of Walt Disney World in October 1971. Rechtman conducted many of Israel's major orchestras, such as the Jerusalem Symphony, Sinfonietta Beer-Shiva, Kibbutz Chamber Orchestra, Tel Aviv Academy of Music Orchestra, and Israel Camerata Orchestra Jerusalem. In 1976, he was named head of the woodwinds in the Israel Philharmonic Orchestra by music director Zubin Mehta. He was its principal bassoon until 1991.

Rechtman wrote transcriptions and arrangements for wind quintet, wind instruments and large wind ensembles. He was acclaimed as an arranger, and his arrangements for wind ensembles (numbering more than 200) have been performed around the world, often under his own direction. Rechtman's arrangements were published by various publishers including Edition Wilhelm Hansen, Belwin Mills Publishing Corp., June Emerson Wind Music, Accolade Musikverlag, McGinni and Marx, and Schott Music. In 2014 he began arranging late-classical and romantic concertos for chamber ensembles, published under his own company, Rechtman Concerto Reductions. His composition teachers included Ödön Pártos, Hanoch Jacoby, Moshe Lustig and Zeev Steinberg.

From 1985 to 1991, Rechtman was music director and conductor of the Israel Chamber Orchestra Wind Ensemble. A founding member of the Israel Woodwind Quintet, Mordechai Rechtman recorded for several labels, including for Decca, Deutsche Grammophon, Koch International Sony Classics and Meridian Records.

=== Academic career ===
From 1968 to 2002, Rechtman was professor of music at the Rubin Academy of Tel Aviv University. He was guest professor at Indiana University School of Music from 1977 to 1978. As a guest professor, he not only taught bassoon but also coached chamber music and large wind ensembles and orchestras at the New England Conservatory, the Juilliard School of Music, and the Royal Academy of Music. He also taught in Canada, Mexico, Australia and throughout Europe.

=== Chess career ===
Rechtman held the IM (International Correspondence Chess Master) title of the International Correspondence Chess Federation. Rechtman was an International Master in Correspondence Chess and played over the board chess in the Israeli league (May 2015). His best result was a 4:4 draw in a Correspondence Chess match versus Samuel Reshevsky.

=== Awards and recognition ===
In August 1994, Rechtman was elected to Honorary Membership of the International Double Reed Society. In 2004, he received the award of the Minister of Education, Culture and Sports Prize of Music Performances for his contribution to music in Israel.

=== Personal life ===
Mordechai Rechtman was the father of Ilan Rechtman. He died on 27 May 2023, at the age of 97.
