= Ilan Rechtman =

Israeli composer (born 1963)

- אילן רכטמן
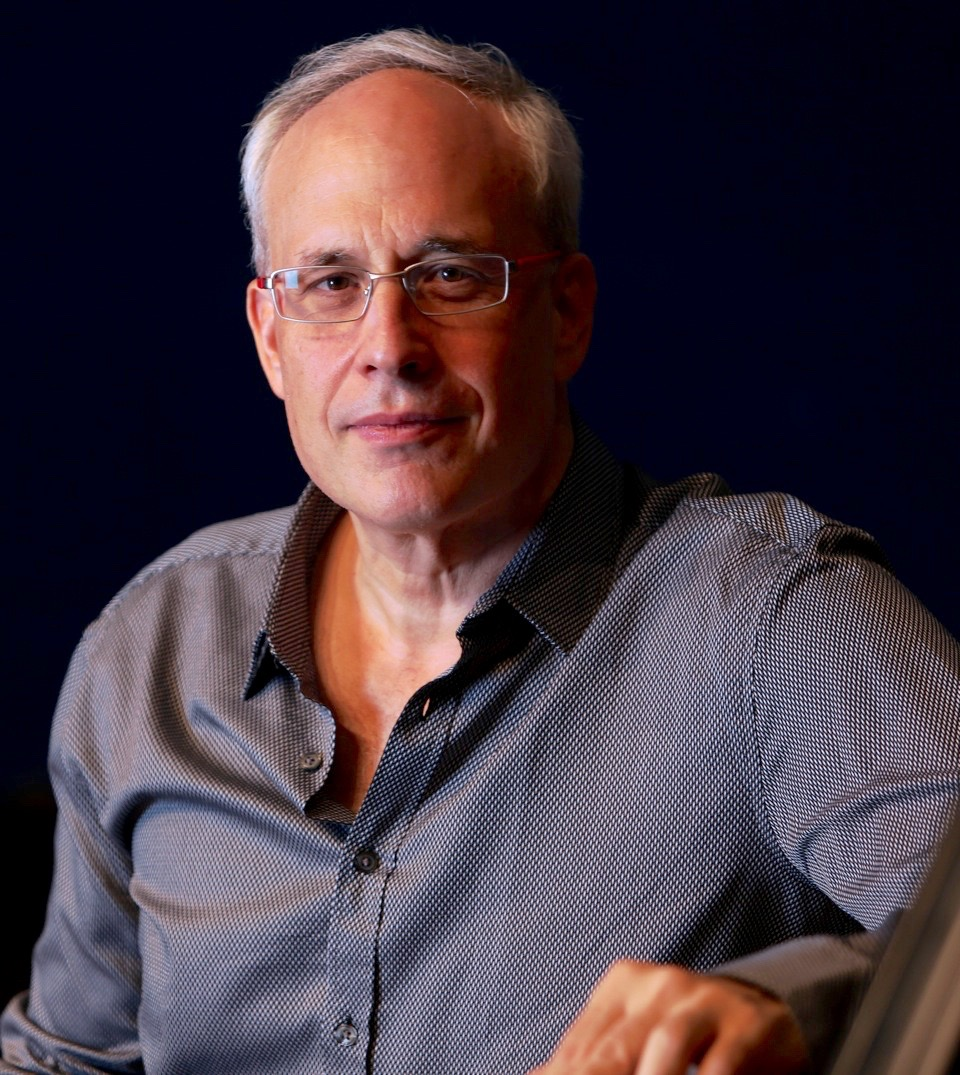
- Born: 4 April 1963 (age 62)
- Occupations: Composer; music director; pianist
- Years active: 1974–present
- Father: Mordechai Rechtman
- Website: www.ilanrechtman.com

Ilan Rechtman (Hebrew: אילן רכטמן; born 4 April 1963) is an Israeli pianist, composer and music director.

== Music career ==
Ilan Rechtman gave his first performance with the Israel Philharmonic Orchestra at age 11, performing Mozart Concerto in D minor K. 466. As a recitalist and chamber musician, Rechtman traveled in over 50 countries and performed in venues such as Carnegie Hall, Town Hall, 92nd St. Y, Avery Fisher, Alice Tully, Weill and Merkin halls, Symphony Hall and Jordan Hall, Orchestra Hall (Chicago), Barbican Center and Wigmore Hall, Salle Pleyel and the Louvre Museum, Suntory Hall, and Seoul Arts Center. During the 6 years Rechtman lived in Brazil (2001–2007), he performed as soloist with the State Orchestra of São Paulo, Campinas and Riberão Preto symphonies, and was director of the "Um Certo Olhar" chamber music series at Sala São Paulo. Rechtman is the winner of several prizes and awards, among them, the Norry Prize (NY) through the America Israel Cultural Foundation, the Clairmont and the Shapira Awards (Israel) and silver medal at the first San Antonio International Piano Competition. He has recorded several CDs on various labels, among them Naxos, Bis, Well-Tempered Productions, Centaur, Meridien, Omega-Vanguard, Cembal d'Amour, and others. His solo recording of Villa-Lobos’ Chôros No. 5 was awarded the Gramophone Magazine’s Editor’s Choice.

As a composer, some of Rechtman's works have been published by the Theodore Presser Company, USA, Hofmeister Musikverlag in Leipzig, Germany and Bottle Cello Publishing in San Francisco, USA. His compositions "Rondo Op. 5" and "Fanfare by the Red Sea" have been commissioned and conducted by Maestros Zubin Mehta and Lorin Maazel, respectively. Rechtman was also commissioned to compose a special work for the 125 years celebration of the Chautauqua Institution Music Festival. Rechtman's orchestral compositions have been performed by the Boston Pops, Pittsburgh, New World, Augusta, Grand Rapids & Cape Cod symphonies.

In the 2008 Beijing Olympics, Rechtman's music was used by Nastia Liukin when she won gold medal in her floor exercise. His music was also used in the 20th season (2015) of “Dancing with the Stars” in the USA

In 2008, Ilan Rechtman was nominated as music director of the Tel Aviv Museum of Art concert programs, a position he continued to hold. In this capacity, Rechtman is responsible for presenting about 70 concerts per season.

Ilan Rechtman is the son of bassoonist, conductor and arranger Mordechai Rechtman.

== See also ==
- Music in Israel
