= Albert Reichmann =

Canadian businessman (1929–2022)

- אלברט רייכמן
- Born: 18 January 1929; Vienna, Austria
- Died: 17 December 2022 (aged 93); Toronto, Ontario, Canada
- Occupation: Businessman
- Known for: Founder of Olympia & York
- Spouse: Egosah Feldman (m. 1955; died 2022)
- Relatives: Reichmann family: Edward Reichmann (brother); Paul Reichmann (brother)

Albert Reichmann (Hebrew: אלברט רייכמן; January 18, 1929 – December 17, 2022) was a Canadian businessman. He was one of five brothers who controlled the Reichmann business empire. Together with his wife Egosah they had four children, Philip, David, Bernice and Libby. The Reichmann family is listed as one of Canada's 100 richest families.

== Early life ==
Albert Reichmann was born in Vienna, Austria to Orthodox Jewish parents. He was one of six siblings. The family escaped Nazi occupied Austria and Paris.

== Career ==
Reichmann joined his younger brothers Paul and Ralph Reichmann, who had set up business in Toronto. Paul was the president of their company, Olympia and York, in 1989 worth 8.4 billion dollars. Albert served in a secondary role as chairman of the company, but was most known for his philanthropic work. In the late 1980s while Paul was devoting his time to the Canary Wharf project, Albert became closely involved in the cause of the Jews in the Soviet Union. He used his money and influence in an effort to enable their emigration to Israel. In 1993, it was reported that he lobbied congress about Libya and Israel. His endowment is based in Brooklyn, New York.

His son, Philip Reichmann, was born in 1958. He managed O & Y Properties Incorporation before it was sold to Brookfield in 2005.

Reichmann was also an investor in ImageSat, who sued the company.

== Death ==
Albert Reichman died in Toronto, Ontario, Canada on December 17, 2022, at the age of 93.
