= Beled =

- Town
- Flag Coat of arms

- Location of Beled
- Coordinates: 47.46609°N 17.09685°E
- Country: Hungary
- County: Győr-Moson-Sopron
- District: Kapuvár

Area
  - Total: 26.47 km^{2} (10.22 sq mi)

Population (2025)
  - Total: 2,394
  - Density: 103/km^{2} (270/sq mi)
- Time zone: UTC+1 (CET)
  - Summer (DST): UTC+2 (CEST)
- Postal code: 9343
- Area code: (+36) 96
- Motorways: M86
- Distance from Budapest: 177 km (110 mi) East
- Website: www.beled.hu

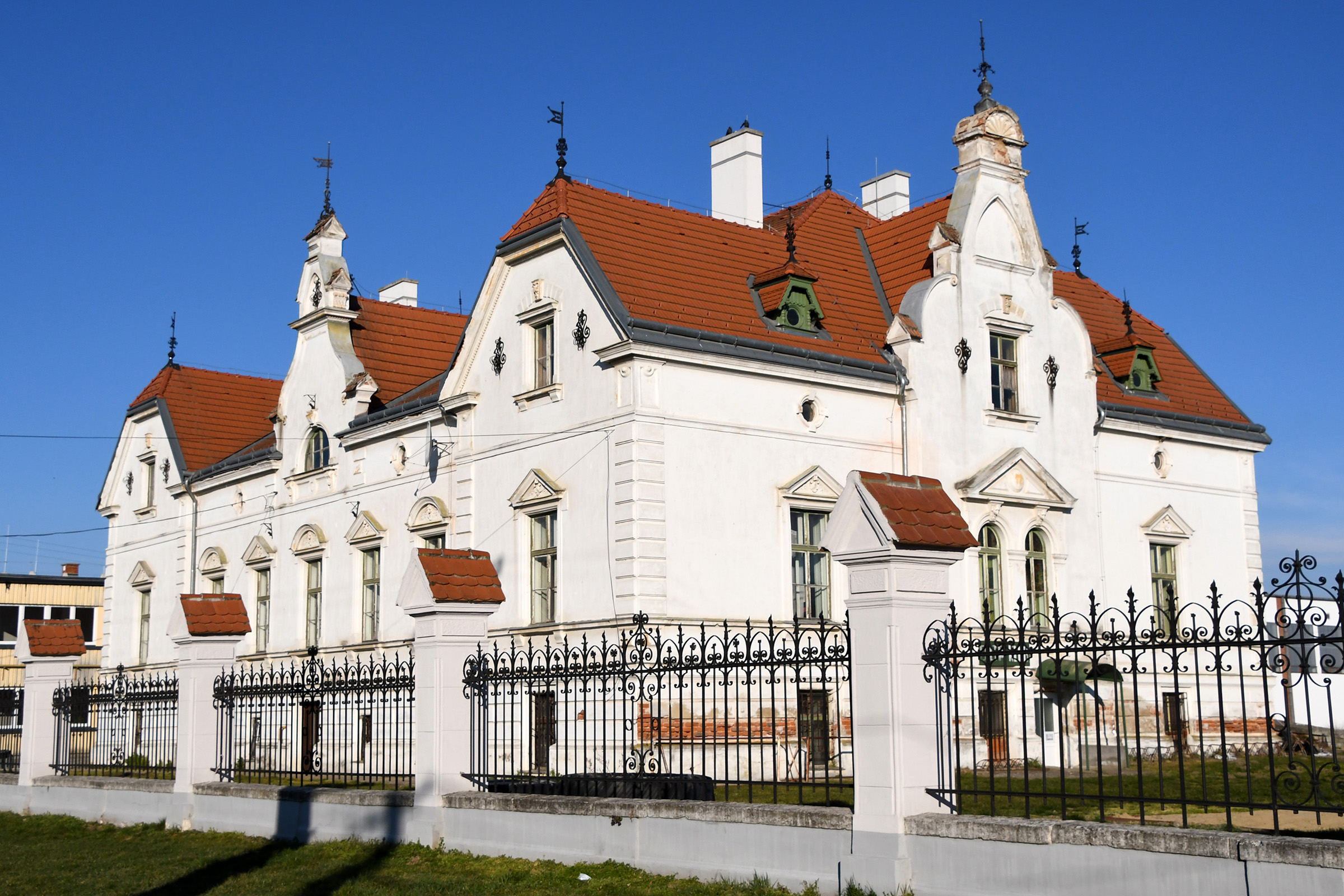
Barthodelszky mansion, Beled, 2021.

Beled is a town in Győr-Moson-Sopron county, Hungary with a population of 2,394 people (as of 2025).

Beled is the ancestral home of the Barthodeiszky Family.
