= Olympia & York =

Canadian real estate company (1967–1993)

Olympia & York Developments Limited
- Industry: Real estate development
- Predecessors: Olympia Floor & Wall Tile Company (1956–63); York Factory Developments (1959–63); Olympia & York Investments (1963–67)
- Founded: 2 August 1967
- Defunct: 30 March 1993
- Headquarters: Toronto, Ontario, Canada

Olympia & York Developments Limited was a Canadian real estate development company that existed from 1967 to 1993. The firm built major financial office complexes including Canary Wharf in London, the World Financial Center in New York City, and First Canadian Place in Toronto. It went bankrupt in the early 1990s and was recreated to eventually become Olympia & York Properties.

== History ==
=== Early years ===
The company was founded by Paul Reichmann and his brothers, Albert and Ralph, in Toronto in the early 1950s as an outgrowth of their Olympia Flooring and Tile Company. It first built and operated warehouses and other commercial buildings in Toronto. Its first major project was the development of the vast Flemingdon Park project on Don Mills Road.

The company then took a major gamble, winning the fierce bidding war for the final undeveloped property at the corner of King and Bay street (the geographic heart of Canada's financial district). The Reichmans won the contract to build Canada's tallest building, First Canadian Place in 1971. The project almost collapsed, however, when reformist mayor David Crombie put a halt to major development projects. After three years of lobbying, the project finally went ahead, to great success.

=== The Golden 80s ===
In the 1980s, Olympia & York grew to be the largest property development firm in the world. In the early 1980s the New York City real estate market was severely depressed, and the Reichmanns bought a group of nine skyscrapers for the low price of $300 million. In only a few years the group rose in value to $3.5 billion. The company became centred on New York, opening an office on Park Avenue. The company won the rights to the largest development project in the city when they were awarded the contract to develop the Battery Park City neighborhood next to the World Trade Center. This project became the World Financial Center and was another great success for the firm.

In 1980, they had also acquired English Property Corp, one of the largest British developers. That led the company to undertake development of the Canary Wharf site in the east of London. The 83-acre (336,000 m^{2}) site would become the largest development project in the world, which would incorporate One Canada Square, Britain's tallest skyscraper at the time. The project ran into problems, however. Britain entered a recession, British firms were unwilling to relocate from the traditional financial centre within the City of London, and despite a personal promise by Margaret Thatcher, the London Underground line known as the Jubilee Line Extension was delayed in construction awaiting the contributions from Olympia & York (with the line eventually opening in the year 2000). The office space at Canary Wharf remained largely empty, and Olympia & York began to run out of cash. At the same time, New York City and its real estate market began a deep recession, and Olympia & York, which was now the largest property holder in Manhattan, began to feel cash flow problems which deeply affected the pyramid-like financing strategy that the Reichmann brothers had adopted.

As well, they held a significant shareholding in the Royal Trustco.

Both Reichmann brothers were strongly religious Haredi Jews, and shut down their construction sites for the Jewish Sabbath and for all Jewish holidays. Even while the success of O&Y made them one of the world's richest families, they continued to live relatively austere lives.

The company diversified through the 1980s. The firm acquired a 50.1% control of Brinco Ltd. in 1980. In 1981, the company acquired an 82% controlling interest in Abitibi-Price Inc. In 1985 the company bought Gulf Canada, a deal that attracted much controversy because it earned the company multimillion-dollar tax breaks. Following a highly publicized legal battle with Britain's Allied Lyons PLC for control of Canadian-based distillers Hiram Walker-Gooderham and Worts Distillery, the makers of the popular Canadian Club brand of rye whiskey, in 1987 Olympia & York became Allied Lyons' largest shareholder.

=== Bankruptcy ===
In March 1992, Paul Reichmann was forced to resign as president. In May, the company filed for bankruptcy and it owed over 20 billion dollars to various banks and investors. The company was finally dismembered in February 1993, and the Reichmanns were left with only a small rump known as Olympia & York Properties Corporation. The new company has again grown into a multibillion-dollar firm, including retaining a large stake of the now prosperous Canary Wharf project. However, they no longer have large holdings in New York City. Many of the NYC properties are now under Brookfield Properties.

== Portfolio ==
A list of notable O&Y current and previous ownership properties:

- Canary Wharf, London
- World Financial Center, NYC (entire complex)
- First Canadian Place, Toronto – including Exchange Tower, First Bank Tower
- Maritime Life Building, Toronto
- Rogers-AT&T Centre, Toronto
- Oakwood Apartments, Portland Oregon
- Commerce Place, Edmonton AB
- 425 Lexington Avenue, NYC
- Olympia Centre, Chicago, Illinois
- KOIN Center, Portland Oregon
- Blanchard Plaza, Seattle, Washington
- University of Lethbridge Building, Lethbridge AB
- York Centre, Toronto
- 150 Ferrand Drive Ferrand Towers, Toronto
- One Yonge Street (Toronto Star Building), Toronto
- Global House, Toronto
- 40 St. Clair Avenue West, Toronto
- 2 St. Clair Avenue West, Toronto
- Queen's Quay Terminal, Toronto
- 237 Park Avenue, NYC
- Flemingdon Park Condominiums, Toronto (5 Vicora Linkway, 15 Vicora Linkway, 60 Pavane Linkway)
- Glen Valley, Toronto (including 715 Don Mills Road, 725 Don Mills Road, 735 Don Mills Road)
- Place de Ville, Ottawa (including Phase III Place de Ville Tower E, Place de Ville Tower D)
- 55 Water Street, NYC
- Purdy's Wharf, Halifax, Nova Scotia (50 per cent stake)
- 2 Broadway, NYC

== O&Y Properties Corporation and O&Y Real Estate Investment Trust ==
Following the collapse of Olympia and York, the Reichmanns began to rebuild their empire. Olympia & York Properties Corporation and O&Y REIT returned to the real estate market in Canada, owning 18 properties in six Canadian cities. In 2005 the family sold these two real estate arms to revive Brookfield Properties for $2.1 billion.

== Gallery of developments ==
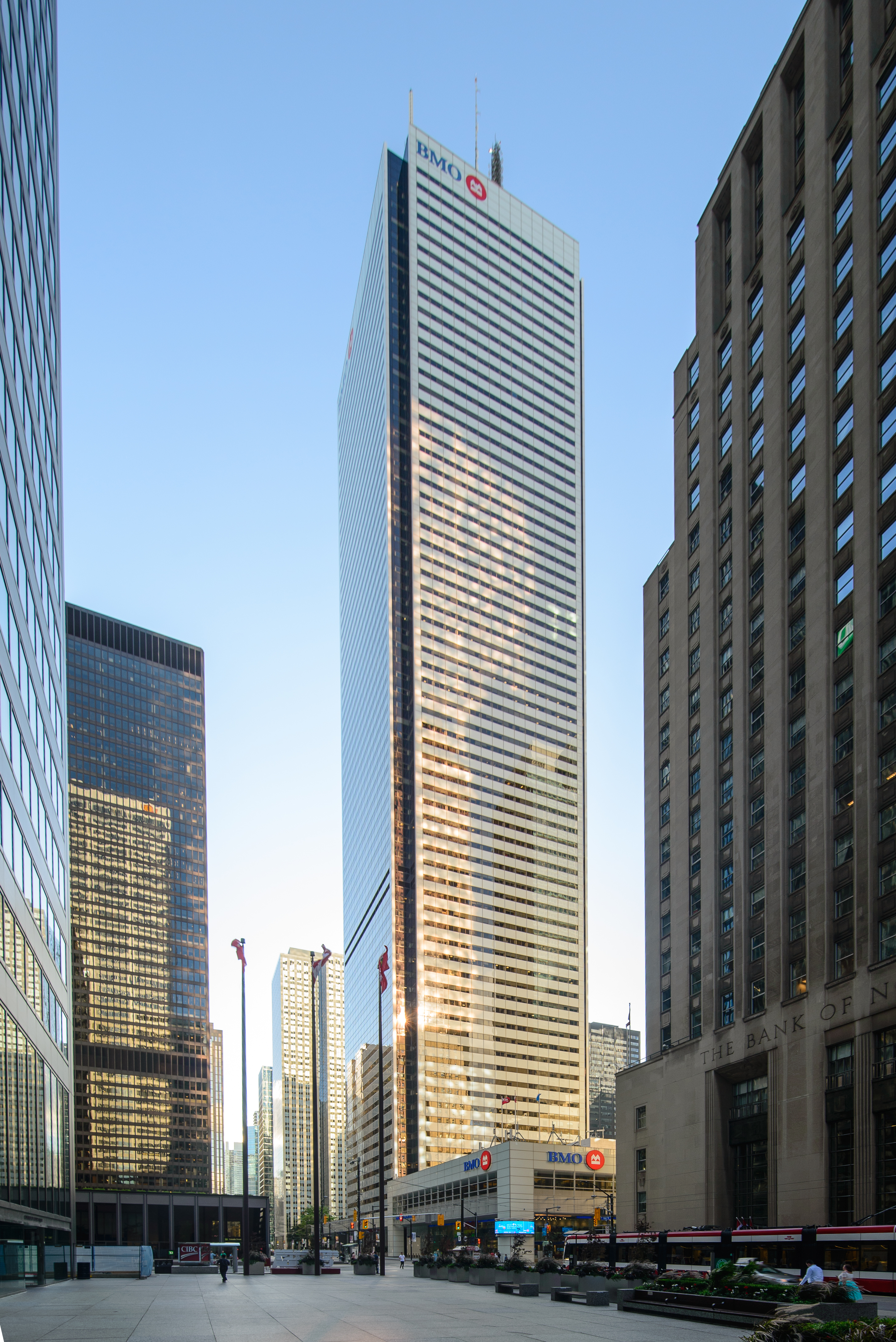
First Canadian Place

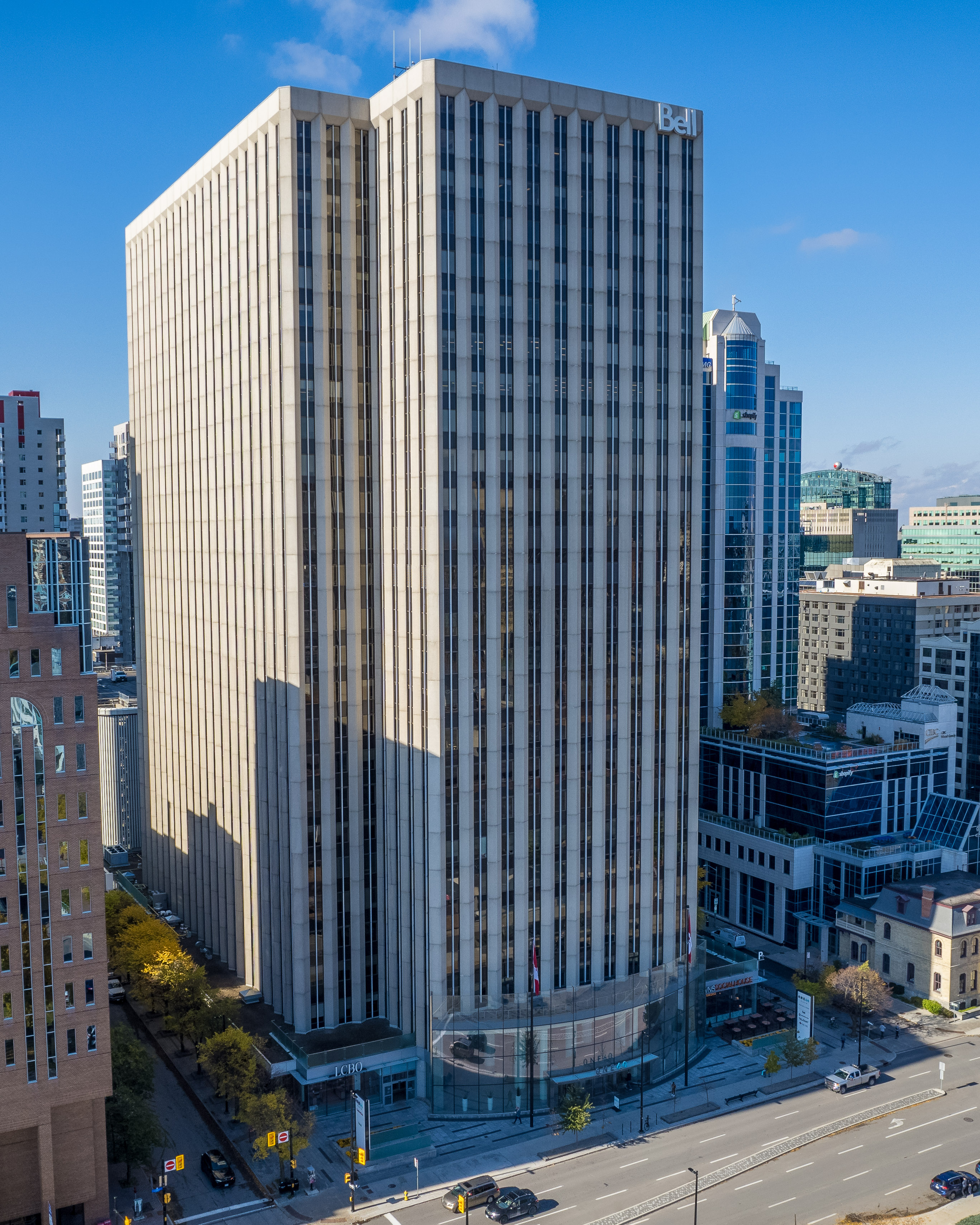
Place Bell

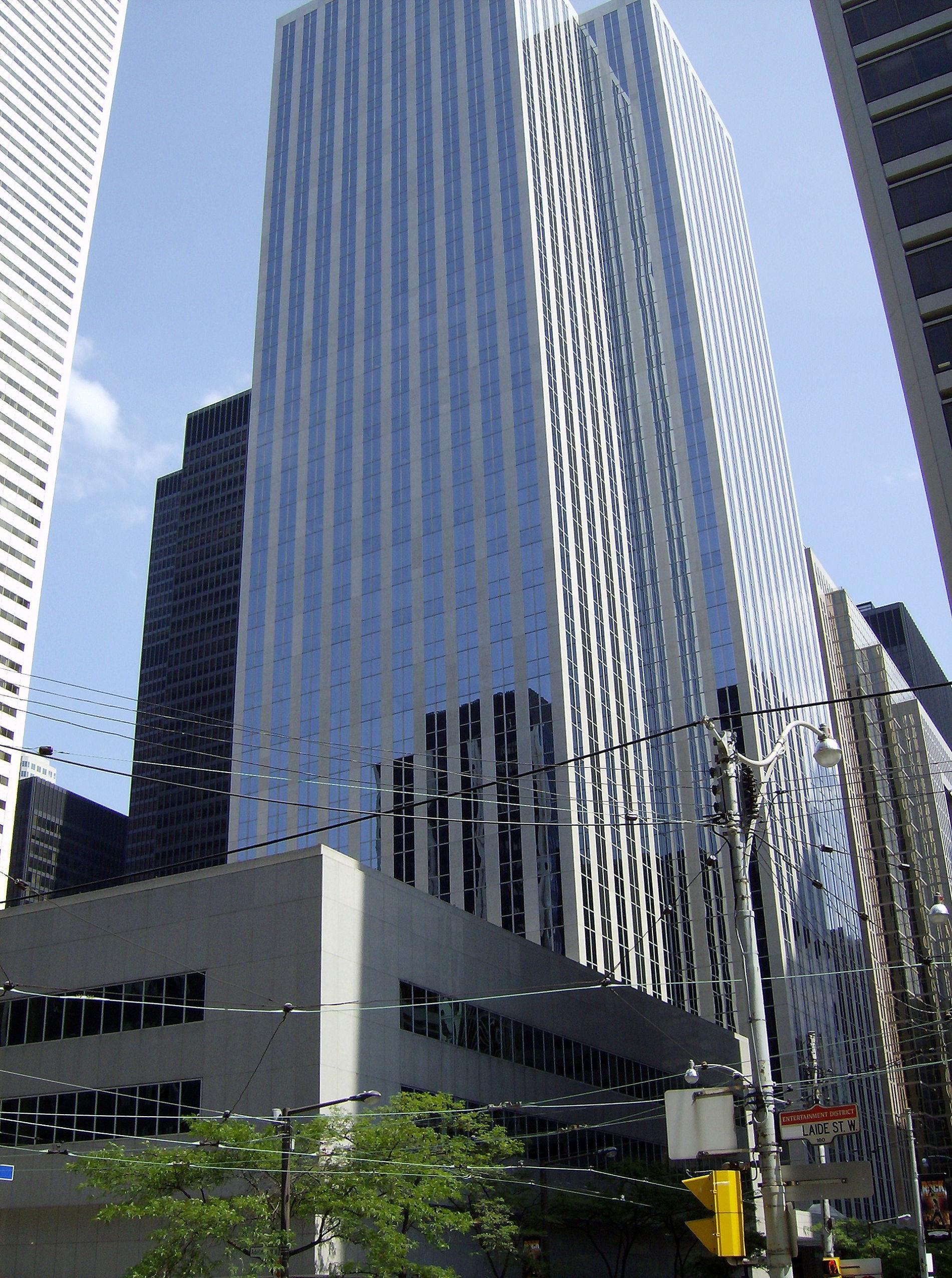
Exchange Tower

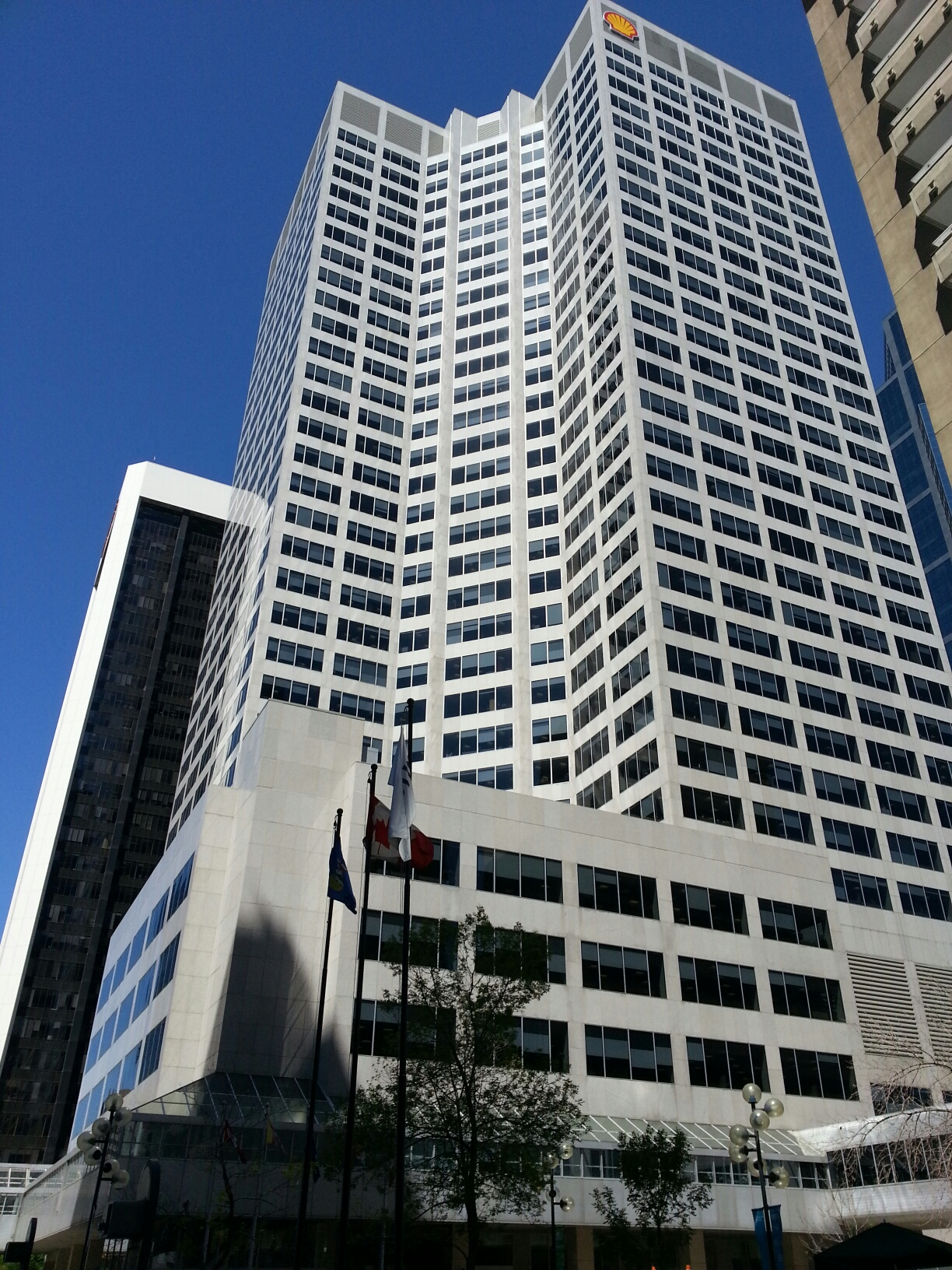
Shell Centre

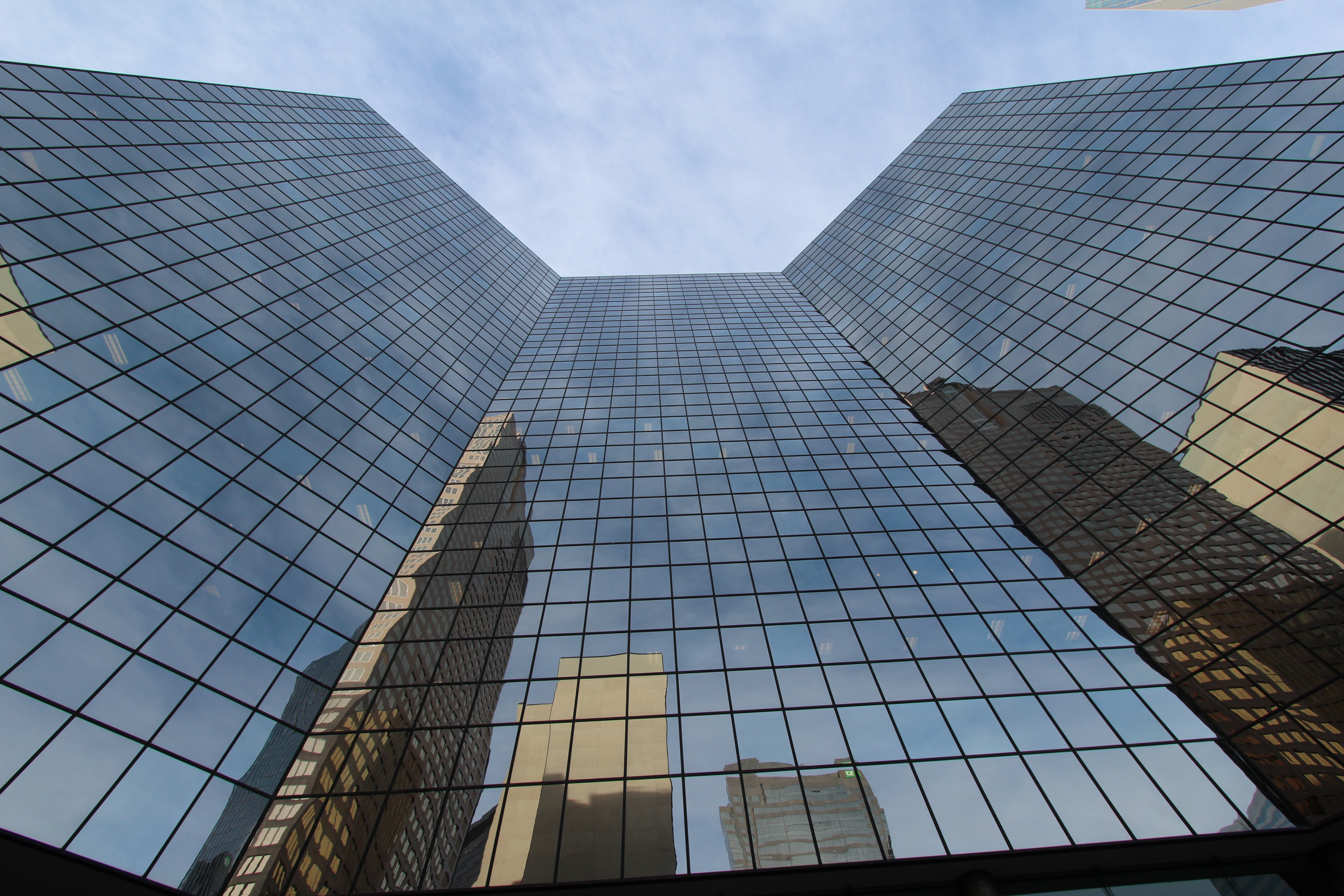
Gulf Canada Square

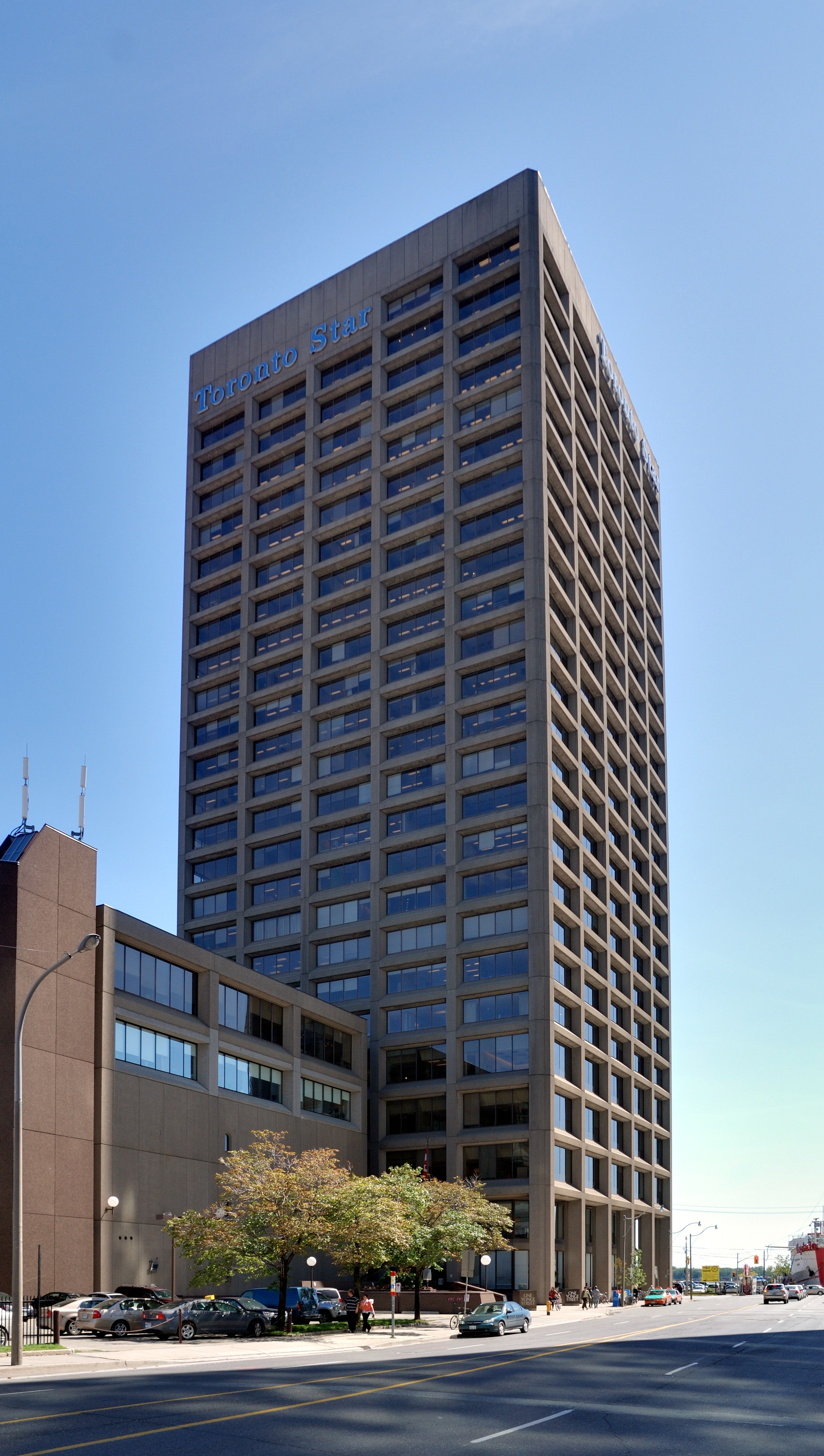
Toronto Star Building
