= Oof (magazine and gallery) =

Art magazine and gallery

Coordinates: 51.6028°N 0.0675°W

OOF
- Formation: 2018 (Magazine); 2021 (Gallery)
- Founder: Eddy Frankel; Jennie Hammond; Justin Hammond
- Purpose: Art and football
- Headquarters: Tottenham Hotspur Stadium
- Location: London, United Kingdom
- Products: OOF Magazine; OOF Gallery
- Website: https://oofgallery.com/

Oof (stylised as OOF) is an art and football magazine, and an associated art gallery. The magazine launched in 2018 and is published twice a year. The gallery opened in 2021, and is located at the Tottenham Hotspur Stadium. The magazine and gallery both showcase football-related visual art.

== Background ==
OOF was founded by Time Out London art writer and critic Eddy Frankel and gallerists/curators Jennie and Justin Hammond. Frankel says that he had tried to keep his passions for art and football separate, until he realised that there were more people in the art world with an interest in football than he had expected.

== Magazine ==
OOF started as a magazine. The first issue was published in February 2018. It included an interview with Rose Wylie and features on Chris Ofili and Leo Fitzmaurice.

The magazine is published biannually, and aims to use art to explore some of the meaning behind football.

== Collaborations ==
OOF has collaborated with other organisations in the world of art and design.

In 2019, Oof organised a five-a-side football tournament between teams from arts organisations including Lisson Gallery, Christie's and Tate.

In 2021, OOF partnered with Umbro to produce limited edition artist-designed football shirts with Juno Calypso and Rhys Coren.

== Gallery ==
In the years after the magazine's launch, OOF organised exhibitions of football-related art at venues around London, exhibiting work from artists including Juno Calypso, Juergen Teller and Chris Ofili. In 2021, Frankel and Jennie and Justin Hammond opened a permanent exhibition space. OOF Gallery is a Grade-II listed Georgian townhouse located in Warmington House, entered via the Tottenham Hotspur club shop ('The Spurs Experience') at the team's London stadium. Tottenham Hotspur have no curatorial say in the gallery's activities.

The gallery exhibits well-known artists alongside emerging, young artists. It is mainly attended (98% of visitors) by those who have not attended galleries previously. The aim is to "make art a normal part of people's lives". Creative Review described the gallery as "an unpretentious entry point into contemporary art, a world all-too-often shrouded in exclusivity." Frankel says that very little of the work they do is about football, but "Football is a microcosm of society...And artists can exploit that."

The gallery directors are founders Eddy Frankel, Jennie Hammond and Justin Hammond.

It is a commercial gallery, with works of art on sale from $10 to $120,000.

=== Exhibitions ===
The gallery's inaugural exhibition Balls featured 17 works by a range of artists, including new pieces from young artists as well as older work from some of the Young British Artists, including Sarah Lucas, Gavin Turk and Marcus Harvey. The exhibition was inspired by a series of Instagram posts by Justin Hammond titled 'useless footballs'. The exhibition was intended to have an immediacy, where "Even if you don’t know anything about art, you’ll know immediately it’s a room filled with sculptures of footballs." Apollo described the art in the exhibition as "terrific", while The New York Times quoted one visitor describing what he saw as a "load of rubbish". ESPN described the exhibition as "a light-hearted blend of introspection, nostalgia and fun." For the exhibition, the gallery also hired three young people through the UK government's Kickstarter scheme, to assist in the gallery and help visitors "navigate the art and figure it all out".

In 2022, the gallery hosted an exhibition of work by photographer Martin Parr and multidisciplinary artist Corbin Shaw, with works themed around the experiences of football fandom. Shaw's banners and flags were shown alongside Parr's black and white photographs of fans in Bradford, Halifax Town and Hartlepool in the early-80s.

In 2022, the gallery showed an exhibition of football scarf designs by artists. It featured over 100 designs by artists including David Shrigley, Guerrilla Girls, Gray Wielebinski and Bedwyr Williams. It was shown alongside an exhibition of Mark Titchner's work called The Hope That Keeps Us Here. The gallery has said they try to show more accessible exhibitions alongside more traditional art exhibitions to cater for their diversity of visitors, many of whom may not usually go to art galleries.

== Residency ==
Alongside the gallery, OOF offers several artist studios. They offer a free residency at the studios. Previous residents have included Evie O’Connor, Kirsty Sim, Leyman Lahcine, Shannon Bono, Winnie Hall, JJ Guest, Louise Ashcroft, Christian Jeffery, Nell Nicholas, Nicole Chui, AC Larsen and Mary Yacoob.

== Exhibitions ==
Year	Title	Theme	Artists	Notes	Ref.
2021	Balls	Shape of the football	Nicola Costantino, Paul Deller, Dario Escobar, Rosie Gibbens, Jj Guest, Jazz Grant, Marcus Harvey, Richard Hughes, Abigail Lane, Kieran Leach, Lana Locke, Sarah Lucas, Lindsey Mendick, Laurent Perbos, Hank Willis Thomas, Gavin Turk, Dominic Watson		
2022	EN-GER-LAND	Football fandom	Beatrice Lettice Boyle, Mattia Guarnera-MacCarthy, Evie O’Connor, Conor Rogers, George Shaw		
2022	Martin Parr | Corbin Shaw	Football fandom	Martin Parr Corbin Shaw		
2022	Shannon Bono | Émile-Samory Fofana | Jakob Rowlinson		Shannon Bono, Émile-Samory Fofana, Jakob Rowlinson	Young artists	
2022	Andrew Pierre Hart | Noa Klagsbald | Leyman Lahcine		Andrew Pierre Hart, Noa Klagsbald, Leyman Lahcine	Part of Summer Season	
2022	Luke Burton | Delphine Dénéréaz | Jamie Holman		Luke Burton, Delphine Dénéréaz, Jamie Holman	Part of Summer Season	
2022-2023	Mark Titchner: ‘It’s The Hope That Keeps Us Here’		Mark Titchner		
2022-2023	The Art Of The Football Scarf Group Show	Football Scarves	Including: David Shrigley, Guerrilla Girls, Babak Ganjei, Gray Wielebinski, Aurore Le Duc and Bedwyr Williams	Exhibition of football scarves by different artists	
2023	The World of Gazza!!	Paul Gascoigne	Jeremy Deller, Douglas Gordon, Lydia Blakeley, Glen Pudvine, Beatrice Lettice Boyle, Rosie McGinn, Corbin Shaw, Trackie McLeod, A Store Like 94, Robert McNally, Winnie Hall, Robin Broadley, Emmely Elgersma, Andrew Pierre Hart, Marcus Wood		
2023	JJ Guest: 'The Other Team'		JJ Guest		
2024	Jack Hirons: ‘Fowl Play’		Jack Hirons		
2024	Tops Off: A Century Of Football Shirt Art	Football shirts	Varvara Stepanova, Rachel Maclean, Trackie McLeod, Christian Jeffery, Martin Kazanietz, Diana Al-Shammari		
2024	Issue 14 Launch Featuring Craigie Harper and Babajide Brian		Craigie Harper, Babajide Brian		
2025	Marcin Dudek: ‘The Ground Harbours The Soul’		Marcin Dudek		
2025	Nicole Chui: ‘Ruined’		Nicole Chui		
2025	Peter Robinson: ‘Double Vision'		Peter Robinson		
2025	AC Larsen: ‘All For One, One For None’		AC Larsen		
2025-2026	Roger Mayne: ‘Football’		Roger Mayne		
