= Bedwyr Williams =

English actress

- Born: 1974 (age 51–52); St. Asaph, Wales
- Education: Central Saint Martins; Ateliers, Arnhem

Bedwyr Williams (born 1974 in St. Asaph) is a Welsh artist, working across drawing, painting, writing and video.

== Early life and education ==
Williams studied at Central Saint Martins and Ateliers, Arnhem.

== Career ==
In 2005, Williams was the Welsh artist-in-residence at the Venice Biennale.

In 2011, Williams' Lionheart & Lightsout brass sculpture was installed in Swansea Kingsway by Locws international’s Art Across the City event. The sculpture commemorates two Swansea cage fighters dressed in drag who were assaulted on a night out. The subsequent fight was documented on CCTV and became an internet hit in 2009.

For the 2012 Frieze Art Fair in London, Williams presented Curator Cadaver Cake as part of Frieze Projects, in association with Grizedale Arts. In a live performance, the artist conducted a live autopsy on a life-sized curator made from cake, complete with edible internal organs.

In 2013, Bedwyr Williams represented Wales in an official Collateral Event at the 55th International Art Exhibition, Venice Biennale. His work The Starry Messenger was presented at the Ludoteca Santa Maria Ausiliatrice, Venice. The work explored the relationships between stargazing and the home, the cosmos, and the role of the amateur in a professional world. The project was jointly curated by MOSTYN and Oriel Davies and supported by the Arts Council of Wales.

== Exhibitions ==
Year	Title	Venue	Location	Notes	Ref.
2013		Ludoteca Santa Maria Ausiliatrice	Venice	Collateral Event at the 55th Venice Biennale	
2022- 2023	The Art Of The Football Scarf Group Show	OOF Gallery	London		

== Awards ==
- 2004 – Paul Hamlyn Award for the Visual Arts.
- 2006 – Beck's Futures prize (shortlist) – for Walk a Mile in My Shoes.
- 2011 – Gold Medal for Fine Art at the National Eisteddfod of Wales for his mixed media sculptures and artworks.

== Personal life ==
Bedwyr is in favour of Welsh independence.
