= Tottenham Hotspur Stadium =

Stadium in London, England

Coordinates: 51°36′16″N 0°03′59″W

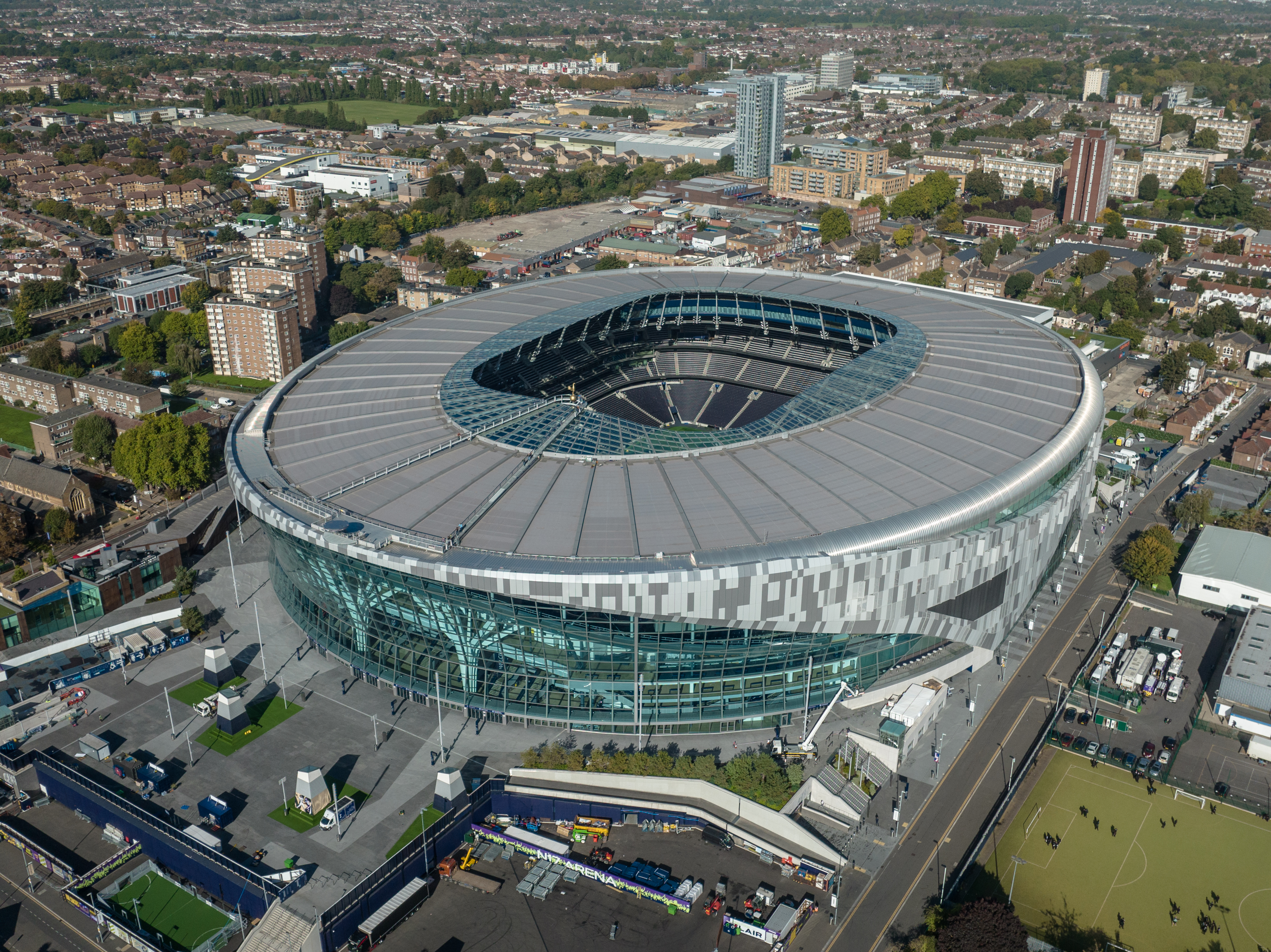
- Aerial view from southeast in October 2022; UEFA
- Interactive map of Tottenham Hotspur Stadium
- Full name: Tottenham Hotspur Stadium
- Address: 782 High Road; Tottenham; N17 0BX
- Location: London, United Kingdom
- Owner: Tottenham Hotspur
- Operator: Tottenham Hotspur
- Capacity: 62,850
- Surface: GrassMaster (football); Turf Nation (NFL)
- Record attendance: Association football (Premier League): 62,027 (Tottenham Hotspur vs. Arsenal, 12 May 2022); American football (NFL): 61,273 (Jacksonville Jaguars at Buffalo Bills, 8 October 2023); Concert; 65,000 (BTS, Arirang World Tour, July 2026)
- Field size: 105 m × 68 m (114.8 yd × 74.4 yd)
- Public transit: White Hart Lane; Bruce Grove; Northumberland Park; Seven Sisters; Tottenham Hale

Construction
- Built: 2016–2019
- Opened: 3 April 2019; 7 years ago
- Cost: £1 billion
- Architect: Populous
- Structural engineers: Buro Happold; Schlaich Bergermann (roof); SCX (retractable pitch)
- General contractor: Mace

Website
- tottenhamhotspurstadium.com

Tottenham Hotspur Stadium is a multi-purpose stadium in Tottenham, London, England. It is owned and operated by the Premier League club Tottenham Hotspur, replacing the club's previous ground, White Hart Lane. With a seating capacity of 62,850, it is the third largest football stadium in England and the largest club ground in London. It is also used for NFL International Series games. It features the world's first dividing, retractable synthetic turf pitch used for NFL games, concerts and other events.

The construction of the stadium was initiated as the centrepiece of the Northumberland Development Project, intended to be the catalyst for a 20-year regeneration plan for Tottenham. The project covers the site of the now demolished ground White Hart Lane and areas adjacent to it. It was conceived in 2007 and announced in 2008, but revised several times, and construction of the stadium, beset by disputes and delays, did not commence until 2015. The stadium opened on 3 April 2019 with a ceremony before the first Premier League game held there.

The name "Tottenham Hotspur Stadium" was meant to be temporary, the intention being to sell the naming rights to a sponsor, but it has still not been renamed. The stadium is sometimes referred to as New White Hart Lane by fans and some in the media.

== History ==
=== Early grounds ===
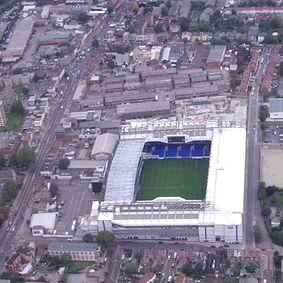
Aerial view of White Hart Lane, prior to its demolition. The greater part of the area in view was redeveloped in the new stadium project.

Tottenham Hotspur was formed in 1882, and early matches of the club were played on public land at Tottenham Marshes. As their matches became more popular with the public and the number of spectators increased, the club decided to move to an enclosed ground allowing it to charge an entrance fee and control the crowd. In 1888, the club rented a pitch at Asplins Farm, next to the railway line at Northumberland Park. However, the ground soon became overcrowded, and in 1899 the club moved to a piece of land owned by the brewery company Charringtons to the east of Tottenham High Road behind the White Hart pub. This became the White Hart Lane ground.

The club acquired the freehold of the ground, as well as additional land at the northern (Paxton Road) end, in 1905. Starting in 1909, a new stadium with stands designed by Archibald Leitch was built over a period of two and a half decades. The stadium had a capacity of nearly 80,000 by 1934. Over the years, the stadium underwent a number of changes and seating replaced the standing areas, which reduced the capacity to about 50,000 in 1979. Significant standing areas, however, still existed, including the long stretch of raised standing terrace favoured by fans on the East Stand known as The Shelf.

Beginning in the early 1980s, the White Hart Lane ground was redeveloped, and in order to comply with the recommendation of the Taylor Report of 1989, it was turned into an all-seater stadium. The capacity of the stadium was reduced to around 36,000 by the time the refurbishment was completed in 1998. The capacity was, by then, lower than the grounds of other major English clubs, with many of these clubs also planning to expand further. As revenues from gate receipts in that period formed a substantial part of the club's income (before it became dominated by TV broadcast rights deals), Tottenham began to explore ways of increasing the stadium capacity to allow it to more effectively compete financially with rival clubs.

A number of schemes were considered over the years; these included rebuilding the East Stand as a three-tier structure, and moving to different stadiums and locations such as Picketts Lock and the Olympic Stadium at Stratford, London. None of these plans came to fruition, except for a proposal to redevelop the existing site that would become the Northumberland Development Project.

=== Planning ===
The club first announced in 2007 that redevelopment of the current site was one of the options under consideration. In April 2008, the club revealed that it was considering the acquisition of the Wingate Trading Estate immediately adjacent to the north of White Hart Lane for building the stadium. In October 2008, the Northumberland Development Project, which included the construction of a stadium, as well as a club museum, homes, shops and other facilities, was announced. The early plan was for Tottenham to move into the new stadium, while it was partially built, at the beginning of the 2012–13 season, with the stadium completed by the end of the following season. However, the project was delayed, with the plan undergoing a number of revisions and the completion date pushed back several times. The club also did not fully commit itself to building the stadium in Tottenham until January 2012, after it had lost its bid for the Olympic Stadium to West Ham United.

The layout for the Northumberland Development Project

The first plan of the project, with a 58,000-capacity stadium, was released in April 2009 for public consultation. In October 2009, the planning application for a 56,000-seat stadium, designed by KSS Design Group, and other buildings was then submitted. The proposal, which included the demolition of eight locally listed buildings and two nationally listed buildings, was criticised by conservation groups including English Heritage, as well as the Government's advisory body on architecture, the Commission for Architecture and the Built Environment. In response to the objections, a revised plan, that retained some of the listed buildings, was resubmitted in May 2010. This plan was accepted by Haringey Council on 30 September 2010, and later by the Mayor of London, Boris Johnson, as well as the government. However, only part of this plan, the construction of Lilywhite House, was implemented.

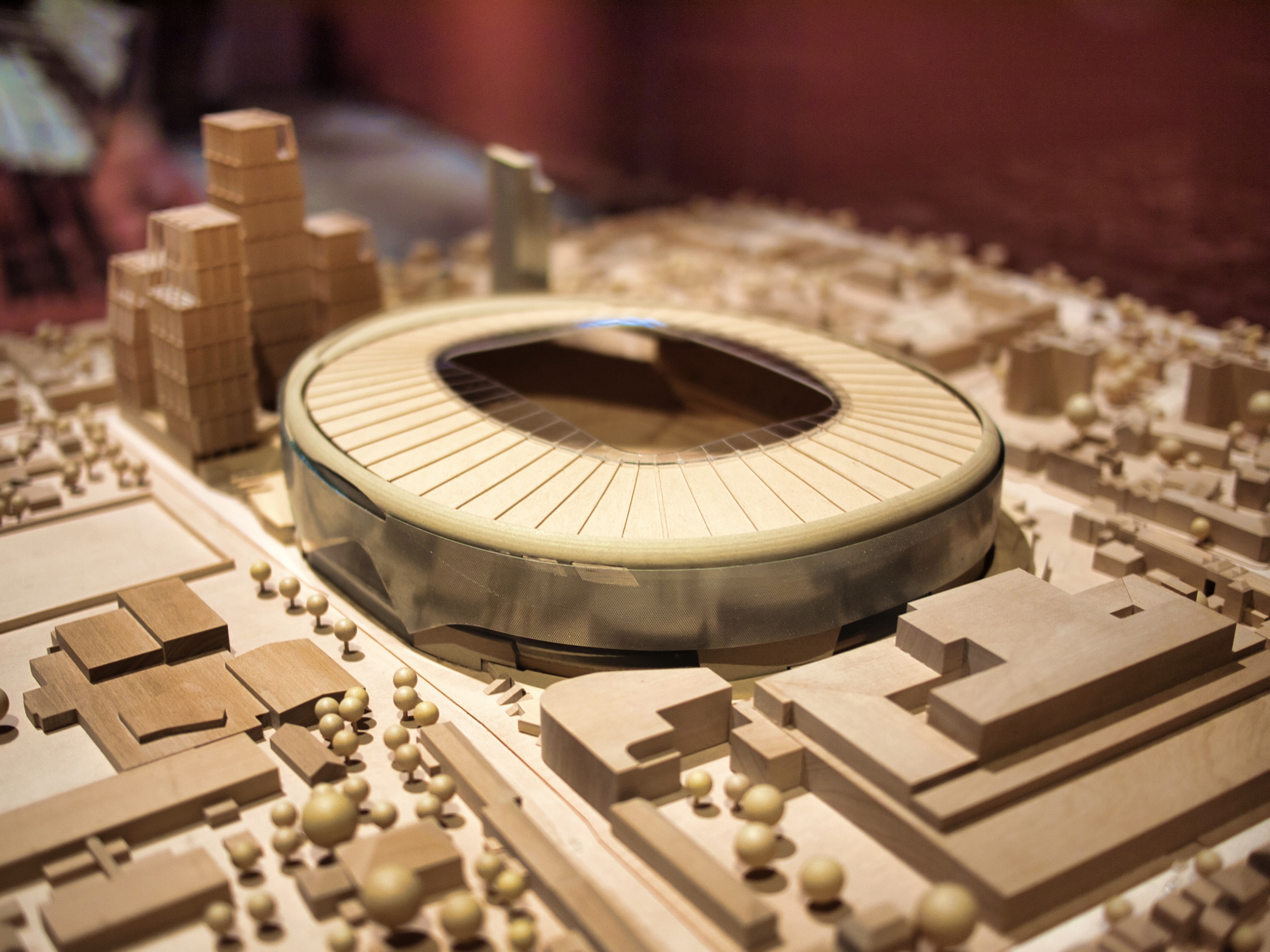
Models of buildings in the Northumberland Development Project

In August 2011, a major riot erupted in a deprived area of Tottenham. Haringey Council, keen to keep the economically important club within the community, issued planning permission for the project on 20 September 2011, and a week later removed the demand for community infrastructure payments usually required for such a project. In a joint statement with Haringey Council in January 2012, Tottenham announced that it would stay in North Tottenham and work with the council to rejuvenate the area. In this scheme, the Northumberland Development Project would serve as the catalyst for a 20-year regeneration program planned by the Haringey Council. In March 2012, Haringey Council approved of plans to hand over council-owned land in the redevelopment area, including part of Wingate Trading Estate, as well as Paxton Road and Bill Nicholson Way, to Spurs. It also agreed on a Compulsory Purchase Order (CPO) to buy the remaining properties on Paxton Road that had yet to be sold. After a long delay, the Secretary of State for the Department for Communities and Local Government, Eric Pickles, confirmed the CPO on 11 July 2014. The owner of the remaining business with two plots on the development site, Archway Sheet Metal Works, then attempted but failed to have the CPO decision quashed in the High Court. On 31 March 2015, the remaining plots on Paxton Road were acquired, allowing the development to proceed.

It was first revealed in October 2013 that the club was considering a new plan for a multi-use stadium that can also host American football games. On 8 July 2015, the club announced that it had reached an agreement with the NFL to hold a minimum of two NFL games a year in a 10-year partnership from 2019. The same day a new design team was also announced, alongside a revised project plan, with Populous led by Christopher Lee responsible for the stadium design. In December 2015, Haringey Council approved the revised plans, including the demolition of locally listed buildings. The Mayor of London also gave formal approval to the plans in February 2016.

=== Construction ===
Tottenham Hotspur Stadium construction

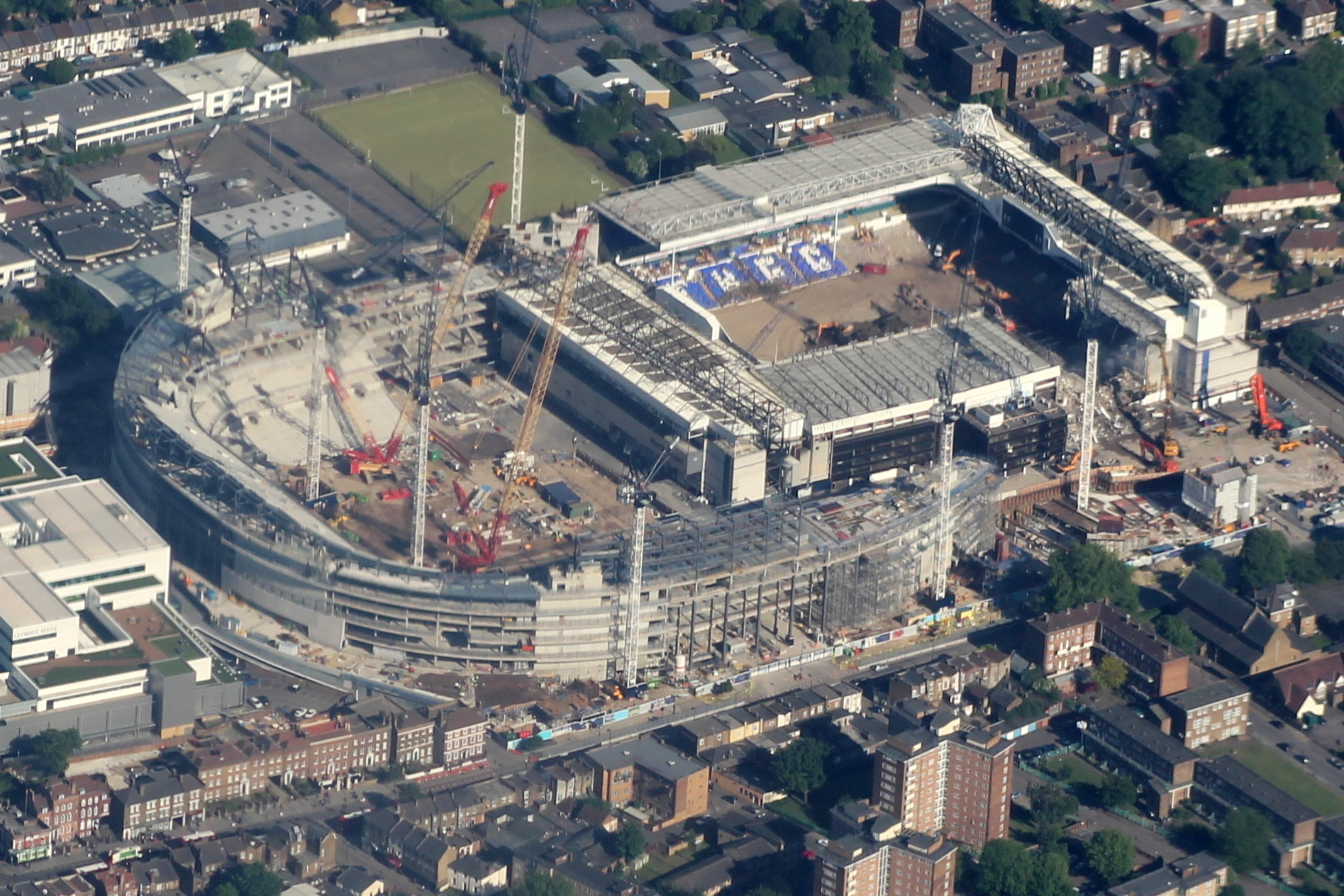
May 2017
Construction of the northern section of new stadium in progress. A day after the last game at White Hart Lane in May 2017, demolition commenced to allow the new stadium's South Stand to be built.

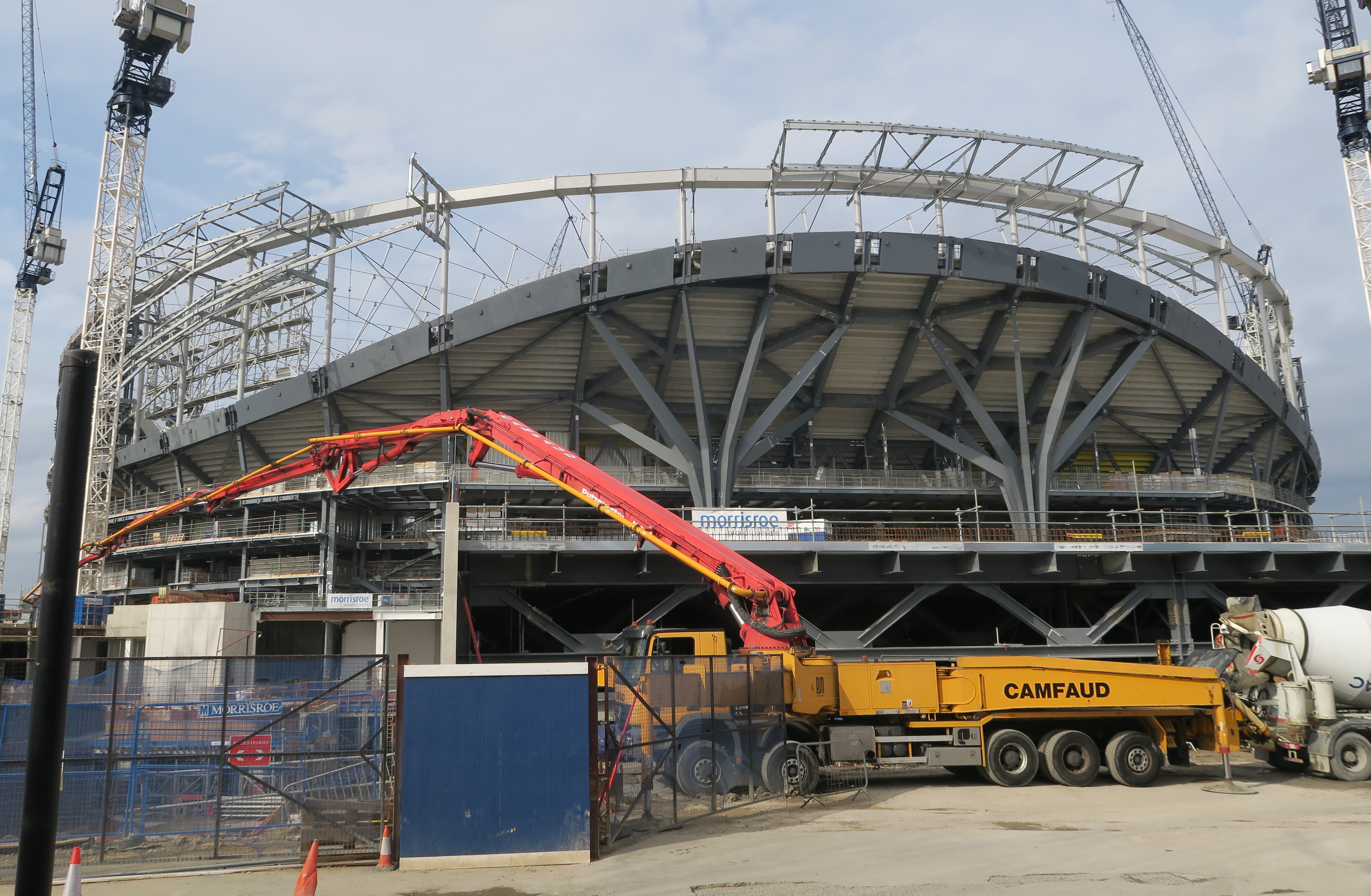
April 2018
Two steel "trees" supporting the South Stand erected and the cable net roof structure were installed and the trays or the retractable pitch are visible under the podium in the foreground.

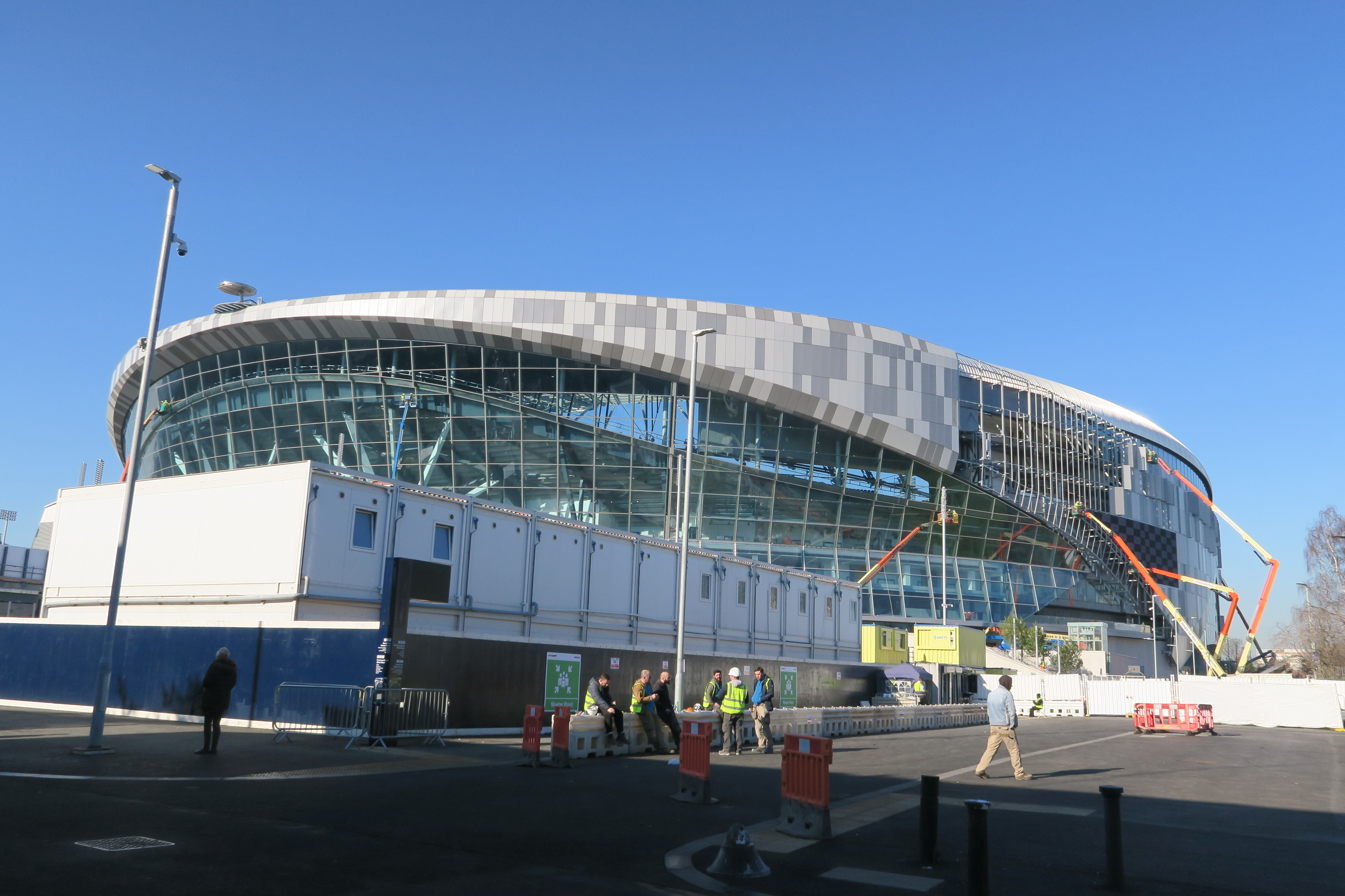
February 2019
Last section of metal cladding panels being installed and the stadium is nearly complete.

Building work on the Northumberland Development Project started in September 2012, however, construction of the stadium itself did not commence until 2015 due to the CPO dispute. The stadium was constructed in two main phases so that White Hart Lane could still be used in the 2016–17 season while construction was still in progress. The first phase involved the building of the northern section of the stadium (including the North, West and East Stands), while the South Stand construction started in the second phase after White Hart Lane had been demolished. A large part of the land north of the existing stadium had been cleared by 2014 while the CPO dispute was ongoing. After the dispute was resolved, preliminary work on the basement began in the summer of 2015, with concrete and ground works for the foundation by Morrisroe starting in autumn 2015, based on earlier approved and amended plans.

The new plan for the project was given final approval in February 2016, which allowed the construction of the main structure of the new stadium itself to start soon after. In order to facilitate the construction of the northern section of the stadium while matches of the final season were still being played at The Lane, the northeast corner of White Hart Lane was demolished in the summer of 2016 after the 2015–16 season had finished. From the basement to level 6, the construction of this section is in reinforced concrete. Three further levels above are constructed in steel frame. There are only six cores in reinforced concrete for vertical circulation of spectators instead of the eight expected of a stadium of this size as they needed to be constructed within the first phase of the stadium construction. The South Stand constructed in the second phase has open staircases to the concourses.

The demolition of most of the remaining White Hart Lane ground began the day after the last home match of the 2016–17 season was played, and the demolition was completed with all visible remnants of White Hart Lane removed by early August 2017. Piling work for Phase 2 of the stadium construction started in June 2017. While the northern section constructed in the first phase is a largely concrete structure, the entire single-tier south stand has a steel frame to allow for a speedier construction. The two steel "trees" that support the South Stand were erected in December 2017. The compression ring that holds the cable net roof structure was completed in February 2018, and the roof structure raised in March 2018.

Parts of the old White Hart Lane have been incorporated into the new stadium – crushed aggregate of the concrete foundation of White Hart Lane was mixed in with new concrete to create the floor of the concourse of the new stadium, and bricks from the East Stand were used for the Shelf Bar. A number of heritage plaques are placed around the stadium marking points of the old stadium, such as its centre. The pitch was laid in early October 2018. The exterior of the stadium is finished with 35,000 decorative tiles, 4,801 perforated metal panels and 2,505 glass panels. The external cladding of the stadium was completed with the last few metal panels of the 'veil' installed in March 2019.

=== Opening ===
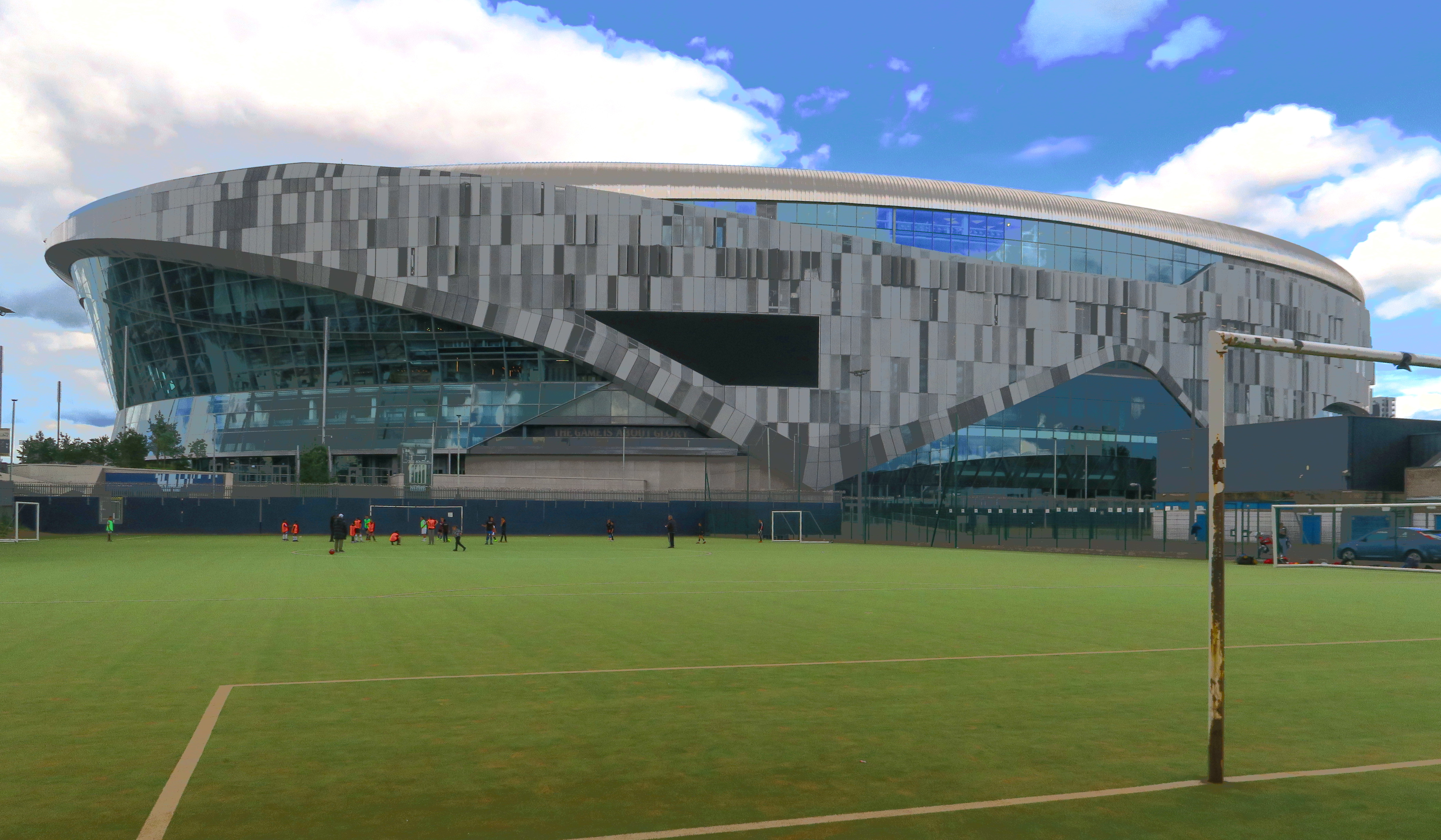
View of stadium from the east

Four test events were initially planned at the stadium in August and early September 2018; the first two were intended only for club staff and officials, and the following two open to the public with increasing levels of attendance necessary for the issuing of safety certificate. However, issues with the critical safety systems due to faulty electrical wiring delayed the completion of the stadium, and these two games were postponed to March 2019. A fan familiarisation event was held instead at the stadium in December 2018. The first match, an under-18s fixture between Tottenham and Southampton held on 24 March, was attended by 28,987 fans and won by Tottenham 3–1, with the first ever goal at the stadium scored by J'Neil Bennett. The second, a Legends match against Inter Milan on 30 March, was attended by 41,244, but resulted in a 4–5 loss to the Inter Forever team.

The opening was originally planned for the second home match against Liverpool in September 2018, but delays to the opening of the stadium forced Tottenham to extend their temporary tenancy of Wembley Stadium for the 2018–19 season until April 2019. They also played their home game in the third round of the EFL Cup at Stadium MK. The first NFL game was due to be Oakland Raiders against Seattle Seahawks on 14 October 2018 but this too was relocated to Wembley following the stadium delay. The club shop was the first to open on 23 October 2018. The stadium opened with a ceremony on 3 April 2019 before its first competitive senior game, a Premier League match against Crystal Palace. The match was won by Tottenham 2–0, with Son Heung-min scoring the first ever official goal at the new stadium.

== Architecture and facilities ==
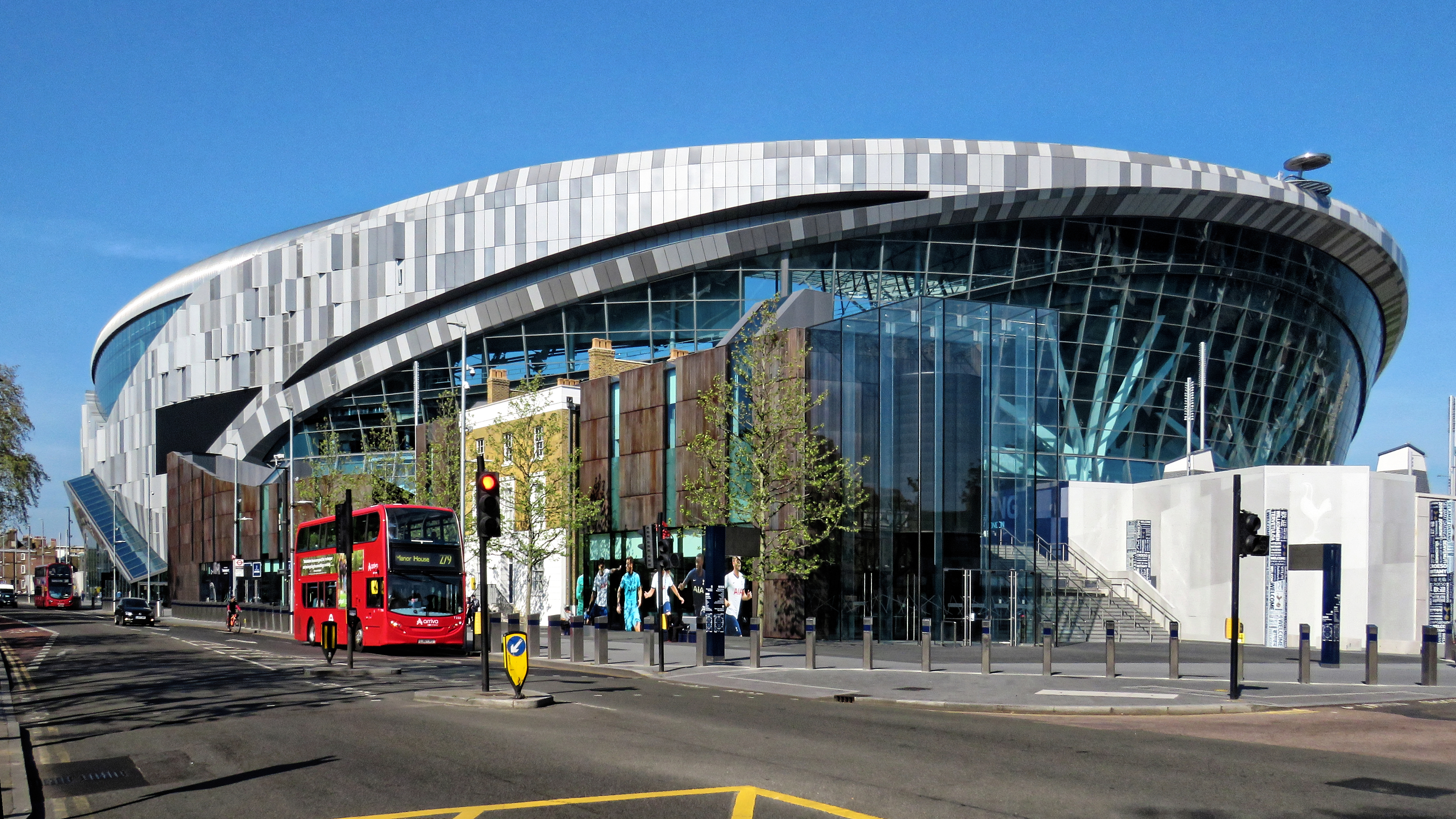
View of stadium from Tottenham High Road

The stadium is an asymmetric bowl, with a capacity of 62,850. The bowl shape of the stadium comes from the need to maximise hospitality facilities while the asymmetry is the result of the creation of a single-tier stand in the south. The stadium is around 48 m high, 250 m long on its north–south axis and about 200 metres wide east to west. The stadium covers an area of 43,000 m^{2}, nearly twice the area of White Hart Lane (24,000 m^{2}). There are 9 floors in the horseshoe-shaped northern section above the basement, and 5 floors in the south, with a gross internal area of 119,945 m^{2}, which is around four times that of White Hart Lane.

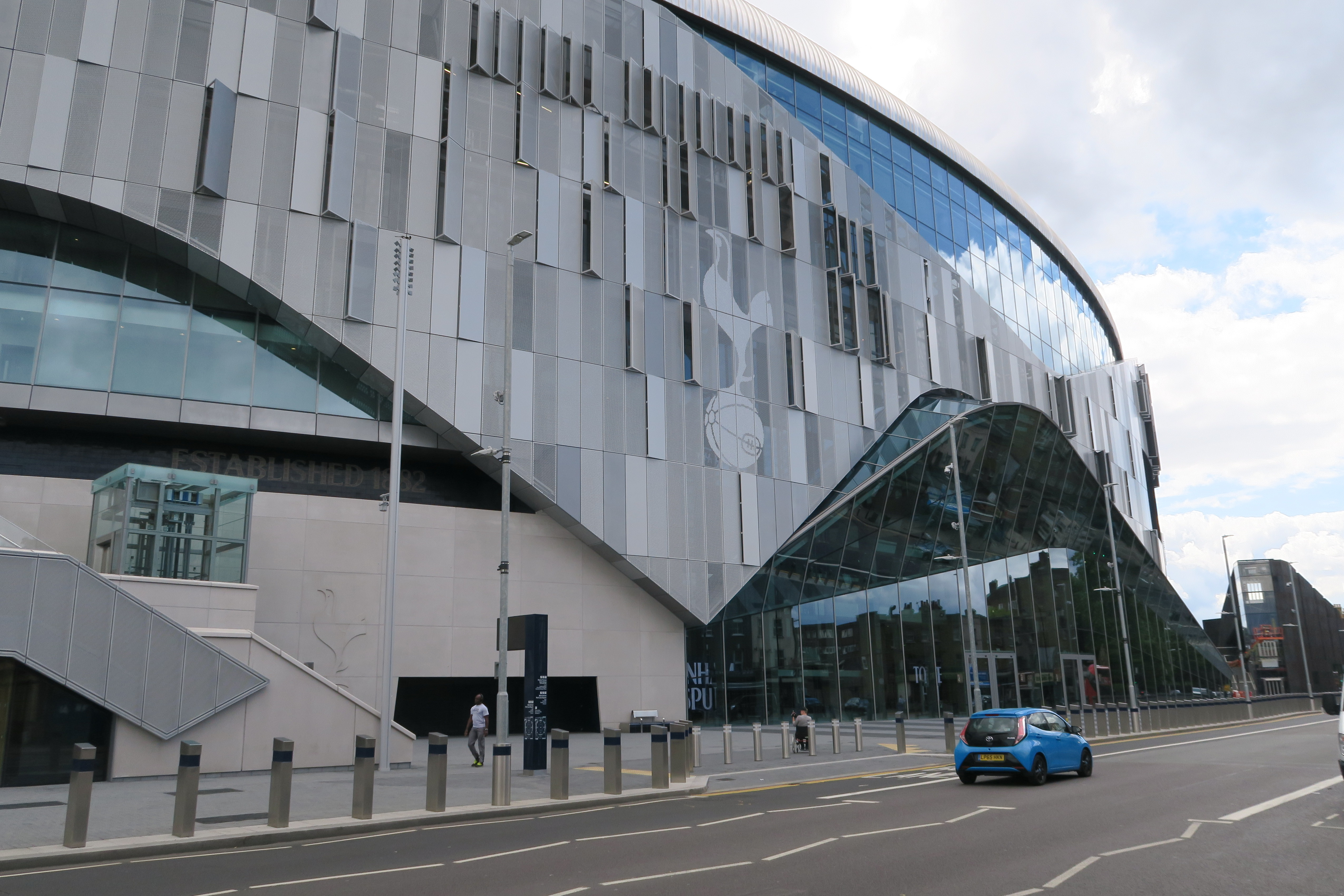
West entrance of stadium on Tottenham High Road

The front of the West Stand faces the High Road and features a projecting, angled, glazed box that encases an escalator and serves as the main entrance for guests and patrons. The projecting entrance, along with the facades of other buildings of the Tottenham Experience, present a traditional linear frontage along the High Road. A 9.5-m pavement is created in front of these buildings to improve the flow of the crowd on match day on the High Road. To the east, on Worcester Avenue, is a dedicated entrance for NFL events. There are two raised podiums for fans access, one to the north and one to the south. Away fans may enter from the northeast corner of the stadium via Worcester Avenue and the north podium. A large open public square, the size of Trafalgar Square, has been created on the south podium as the main access point for home fans. The square has a number of ventilation shafts, and it may be used for sporting and community activities. The square is fronted by a single 7,000 m^{2} curved glazed facade, behind which is a 5-storey atrium where fans can access the South Stand.

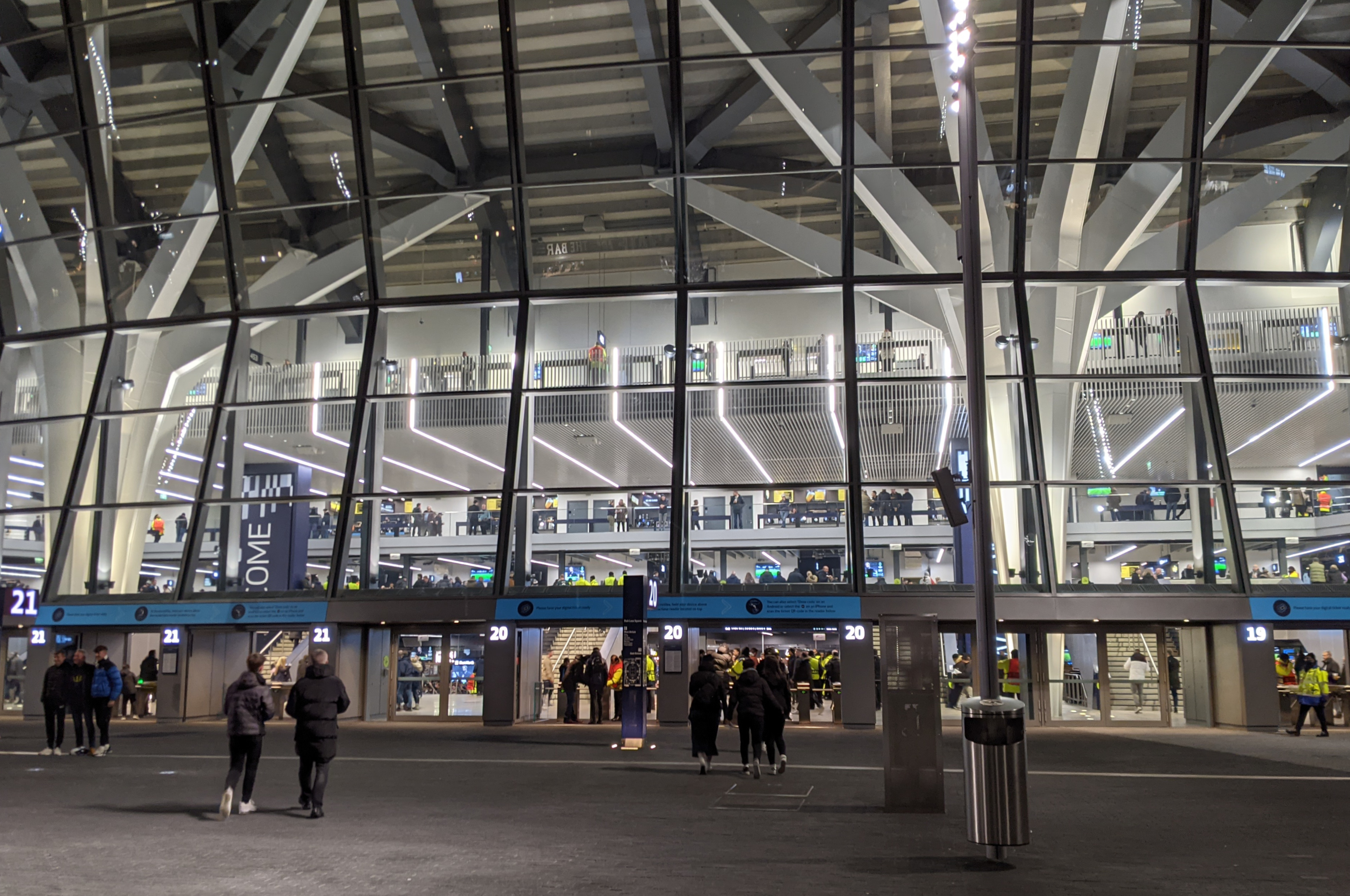
South entrance to the atrium of the stadium

The bulk of the structure dominates the surrounding area, but the appearance of the mass of the building is modulated by different claddings of glass, metal panels and pre-cast concrete. The perforated metal panels serve as a screen but allow for natural ventilation and light for the open plant areas in the stadium, and they also act as a unifying sculptured element in the appearance of the stadium. Regions of glazing not covered by the metal screen, including the main entrances and concourses, offices, Sky Lounge, as well the extensive glazed area to the south, allow for views into and out of the stadium. The metal panels may be in an open or closed position, and they are lined with LED luminaires that glow on match nights.

The roof is a cable net structure, held in place by an elliptically shaped compression ring. The roof has a circumference of 720 metres, and it is clad in standing seam aluminium panels that end with extruded polycarbonate on the inside edge to allow light through onto the pitch but reduce the contrast of the shadow of the roof on the pitch. 810 curved aluminium eave cassettes connect the roof to the wall. The pitch is lit by 324 LED floodlights, arranged in 54 groups of six and attached to the columns of the roofing system. There are four large LED screens inside the stadium, the two on the south side are the largest of any stadium in Western Europe. There are also two facade video displays on the outside of the stadium, three tiers of LED ribbon displays inside, and nearly 1,800 video screens in and around the stadium.

The stadium is designed like a concert hall with good acoustics in mind so as to optimise the atmosphere on match day. The corners of the stadium are enclosed and the stands are placed close to the pitch, with fans generating a "wall of sound" that can reverberate around the ground. The design extends to the shape and material of the roof and the seating, such as aluminium soffit lining to the roof, and aims to produce cleaner and quicker reverberation times that allow fans to sing in sync thereby producing chants that are louder and last longer. The stadium is also designed to maintain the character but noisier than White Hart Lane and facilitate a sense of "home".

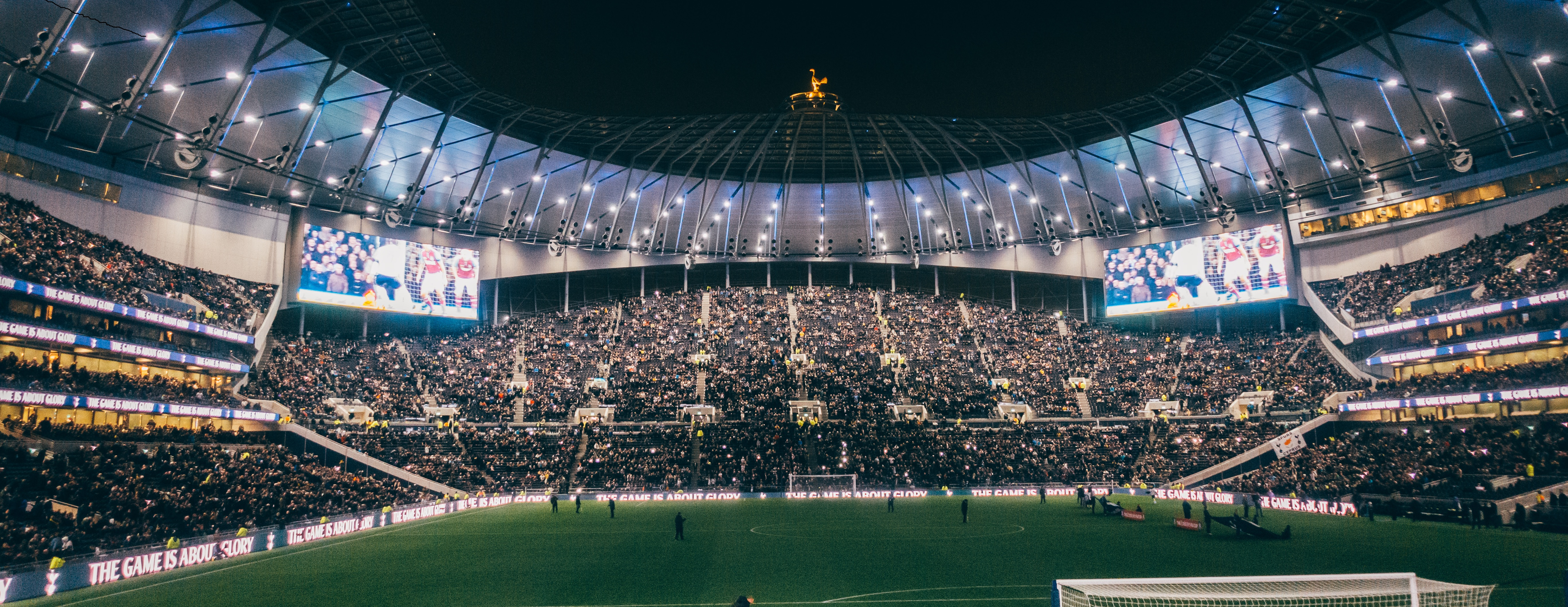
View of South Stand. The Dare Skywalk and the cockerel are visible on the roof above the South Stand.

=== Stands ===
Although the stadium is designed as a bowl, it still has four distinct stands. The tiers of the stands are set at angles of up to 35 degrees, the maximum permissible in British stadium design, and all seats provide clear views of the pitch for the ticket holders. The South Stand is designated the 'Home End', and it has a single tier which is the largest single-tier stand in the country, with seating for 17,500 fans. It is 34.1 m (112 ft) high with a 34 degree incline, has concourses on Level 1, 2, 3 and 4 and is accessible from the south atrium. The design of the South Stand is influenced by the "Yellow Wall" of Borussia Dortmund's Westfalenstadion and the stand is intended to be the "heart-beat" of the stadium that can generate an intense atmosphere on match day.

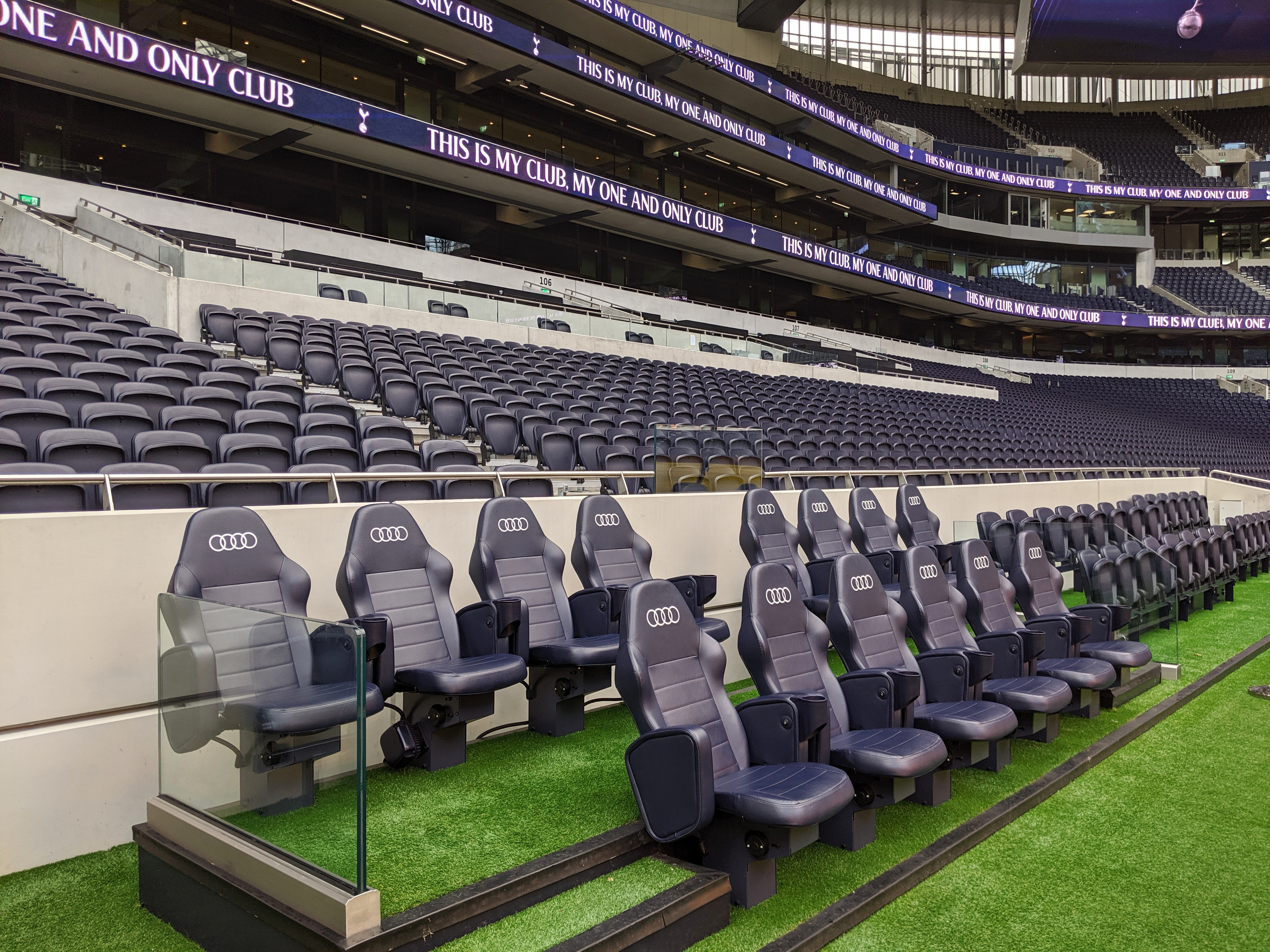
Away dugout below the West Stand

The 35.5 m (116 ft) high North Stand has three tiers with concourses on Level 1, 2, 4 and 5. The East and West Stands are 33.8 m (111 ft) and 33.2 m (109 ft) high respectively, and have concourses on Level 1 and 5. Both stands have four tiers each, two of which are smaller and intended for premium seating. There are around 8,000 of these premium seats as well as 70 private loges and super loges for premium members and corporate hospitality. The seats of the stadium, initially numbered 62,062 but increased in three stages to 62,850. are in navy blue, with 42,000 of these reserved for season ticket holders. The seats have a minimum width of 470 mm (19 in) (compared with the 455–460 mm (17.9–18.1 in) of the previous stadium), increasing to 520–700 mm (20–28 in) for premium seats, with legroom of between 780 and 858 mm (30.7 and 33.8 in).

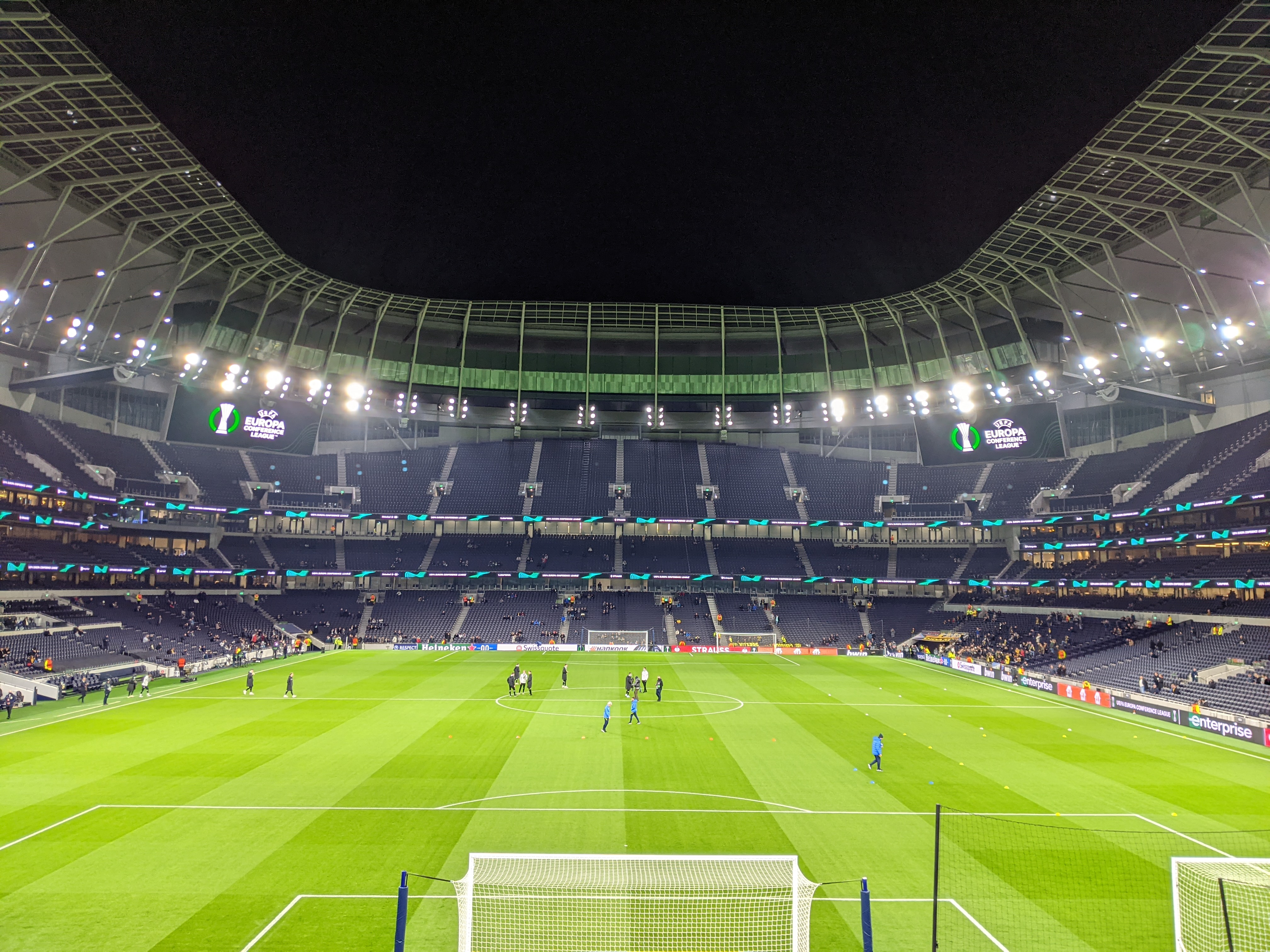
Views towards the North Stand. Away fans sit on the northeast corner. The Sky Bridge is above the North Stand.

Away fans are allocated seats in the north east corner; 3,000 seats in the lower tier for Premier League games, while for domestic cups they may be allocated up to 15% of the capacity spread over three tiers. The stands include areas with 7,500 seats that can be quickly turned into safe standing areas should there be a change in the legislation that banned standing in football stadiums. It is the first Premier League stadium with areas of rail seating, and it is one of the five stadiums to trial "safe standing" in January 2022. A family area is located in the north west corner for those attending with their children. Disabled fans are catered for with 265 wheelchair bays, areas for assistance dogs as well as facilities for those with "complex care requirements". Accessible seating is available in all four stands, where the design allows for flexible seating for family groups.

=== Pitches ===
The association football pitch of the stadium has a standard dimension of 105 m × 68 m (344 ft × 223 ft), same in size as the pitches at Old Trafford and Wembley Stadium, but 440 square metres (4,700 sq ft) larger than the pitch at White Hart Lane. The overall grass surface is 114.58 by 79.84 metres (375.9 ft × 261.9 ft), including the perimeter between the pitch and the stands. The distances between the stands and the pitch are minimised so as to enhance the atmosphere on match days – 7.97 metres (26.1 ft) on the east, north and west sides from the front of the stand to the pitch, and 4.985 metres (16.4 ft) at the south end of the pitch.

In order to keep the football pitch in optimum condition, there are two different surfaces – a GrassMaster hybrid grass pitch for football, and a synthetic turf surface underneath to be used for NFL games, as well as concerts and other events. The football pitch can be retracted in a way similar to that of the Arizona Cardinals' home stadium, but it is the first in the world to split into three sections before retracting. The pitch needed to split so as to accommodate the two columns supporting the South Stand when retracting. Each of the three sections weighs more than 3,000 tonnes, and is made up of 33 smaller trays, making a total of 99 trays, with a combined weight of 10,000 tonnes. The retracting pitch slides into the car park under the South Stand and the south podium, and the surface can be switched in 25 minutes to an hour. The NFL field is placed 1.6 metres beneath the natural turf surface, and the change in height when the surface is switched also produces ideal sightlines for the front row for both codes (NFL team personnel tend to stand along sidelines in allocated areas which would block the view of the front row if the field level is not lower in NFL games).

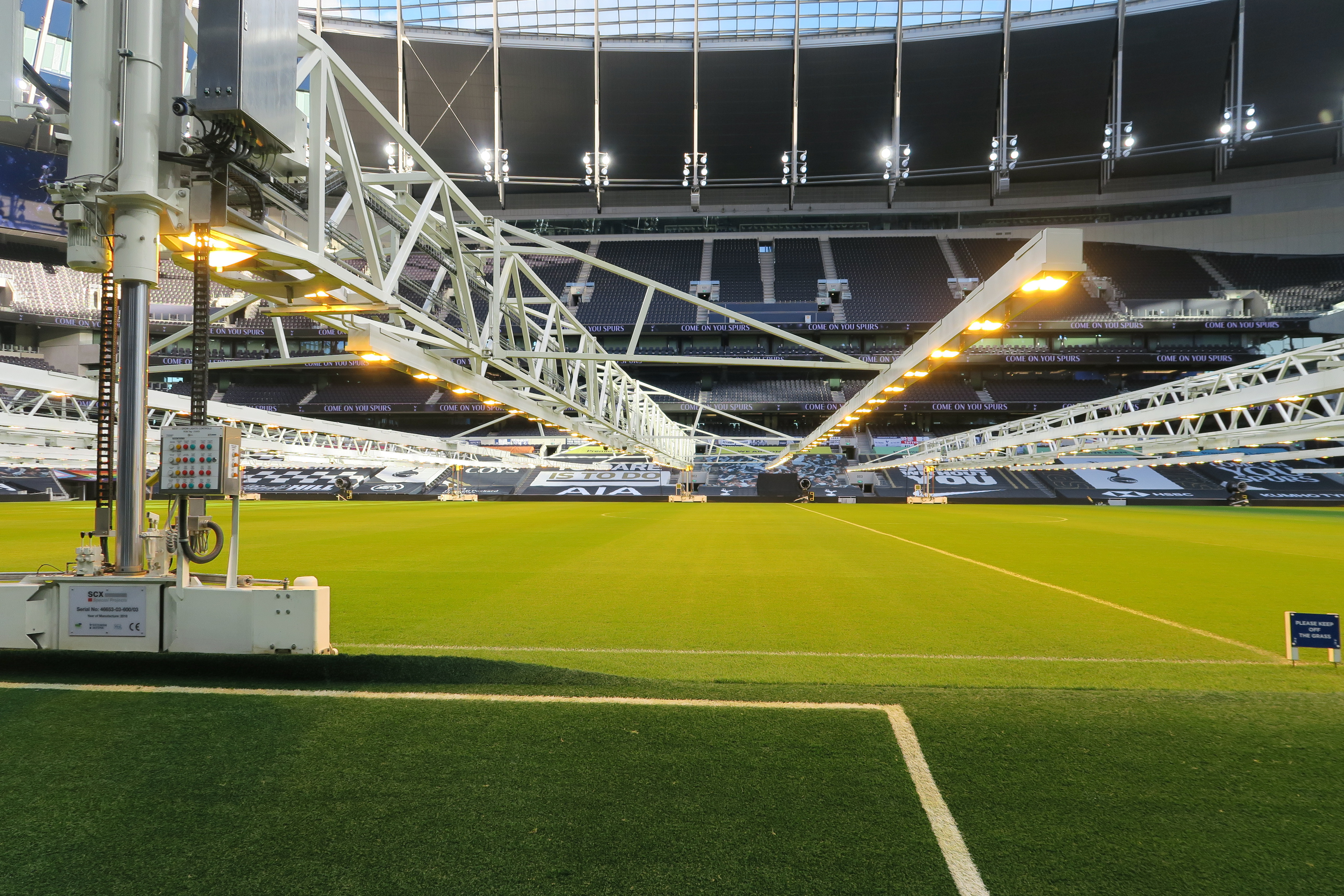
Grow lights suspended on trusses over the pitch

The stadium features the world's first integrated grow lighting system over the pitch. Grow lights are suspended on six 70-metre trusses to encourage the growth of the grass in the shaded areas of the stadium, and they can be folded away under the North Stand when not in use. The grass can also be maintained for up to 5 days with artificial lighting, air ventilation, dehumidification and irrigation systems when the pitch is retracted under the south podium.

=== Facilities ===
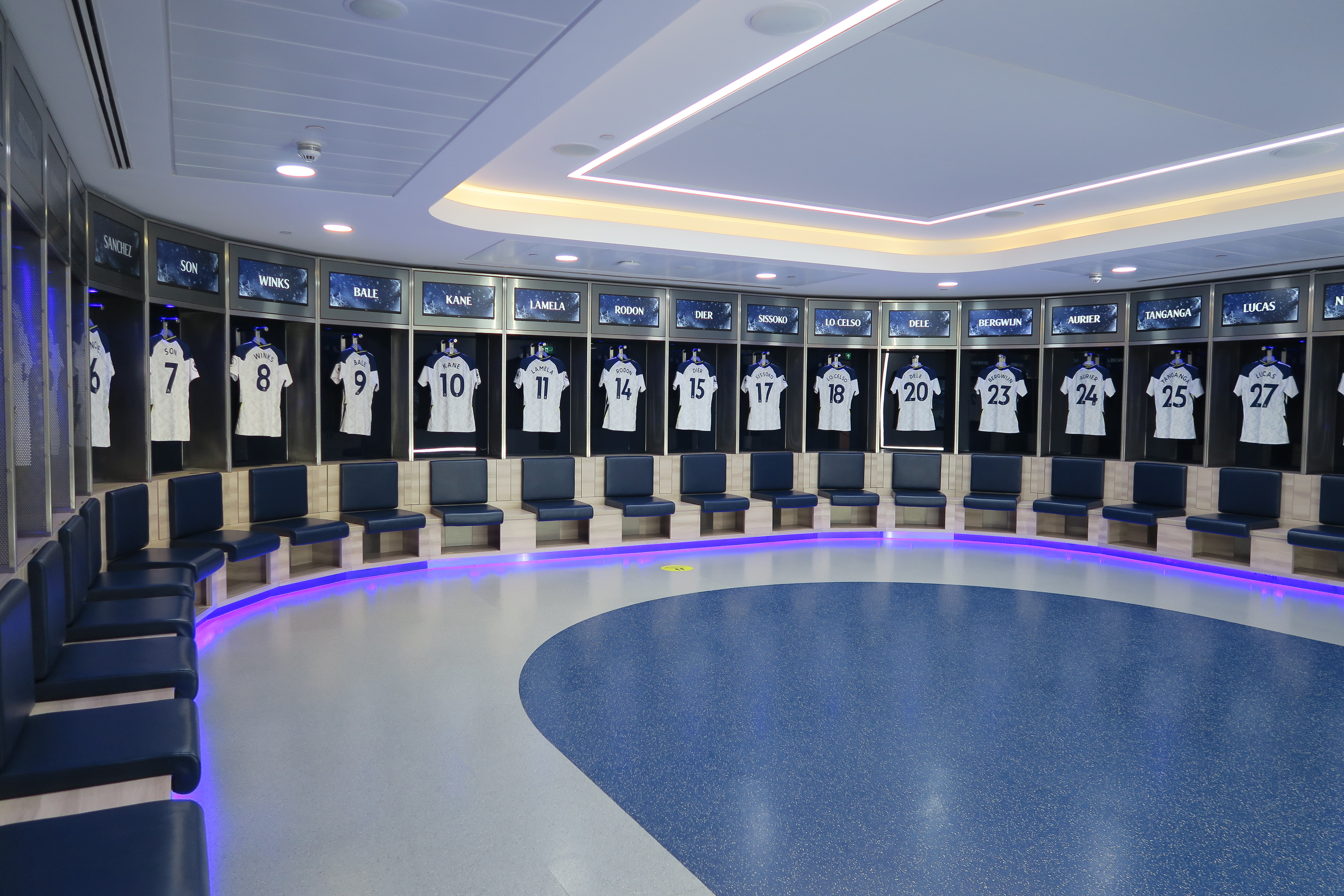
Home dressing room at the stadium

The stadium provides separate facilities for football and NFL players; these include changing rooms, medical facilities, restaurants, hydrotherapy pools, warm-up areas, pre-match players' lounge, as well as lounges and creches for their families. It also caters for the different requirements of football and NFL media. There are a number of bars for fans on match day. In the South Stand is the Goal Line Bar, which at 65 m (213 ft) is the longest in Europe. The White Hart and The Shelf are bars in the East Stand, while The Dispensary is found in the West Stand. The stadium offers a wide range of food and drinks outlets (65 at the club opening); in the South Stand is the 'Market Place' with a range of food and drink outlets, and a selection of food outlets are also available in other stands. Other features include an in-house bakery and the world's first microbrewery in a football stadium, which can produce 1 million pints of craft beer a year and deliver up to 10,000 pints a minute. The stadium is the first cashless stadium in the country, it also offers stadium-wide connectivity for all the fans with more Wi-Fi access points and Bluetooth beacons as well as greater bandwidth than any other stadium. Some car parking spaces, but not for general admission fans, are provided underneath the stand and in the basement. A range of hospitality facilities in the East and West Stands are provided for those with premium memberships. These include two Sky Lounges on the top floor of the East and West Stands, with views over London and the pitch, the Sky Bridge, which is the world's first bridge to be suspended from the roof of a stadium, 65 suites of private loges and super loges, Michelin star level dining, and the Tunnel Club that allows its members to observe the players as they walk from the dressing room to the pitch through a glass-walled tunnel.

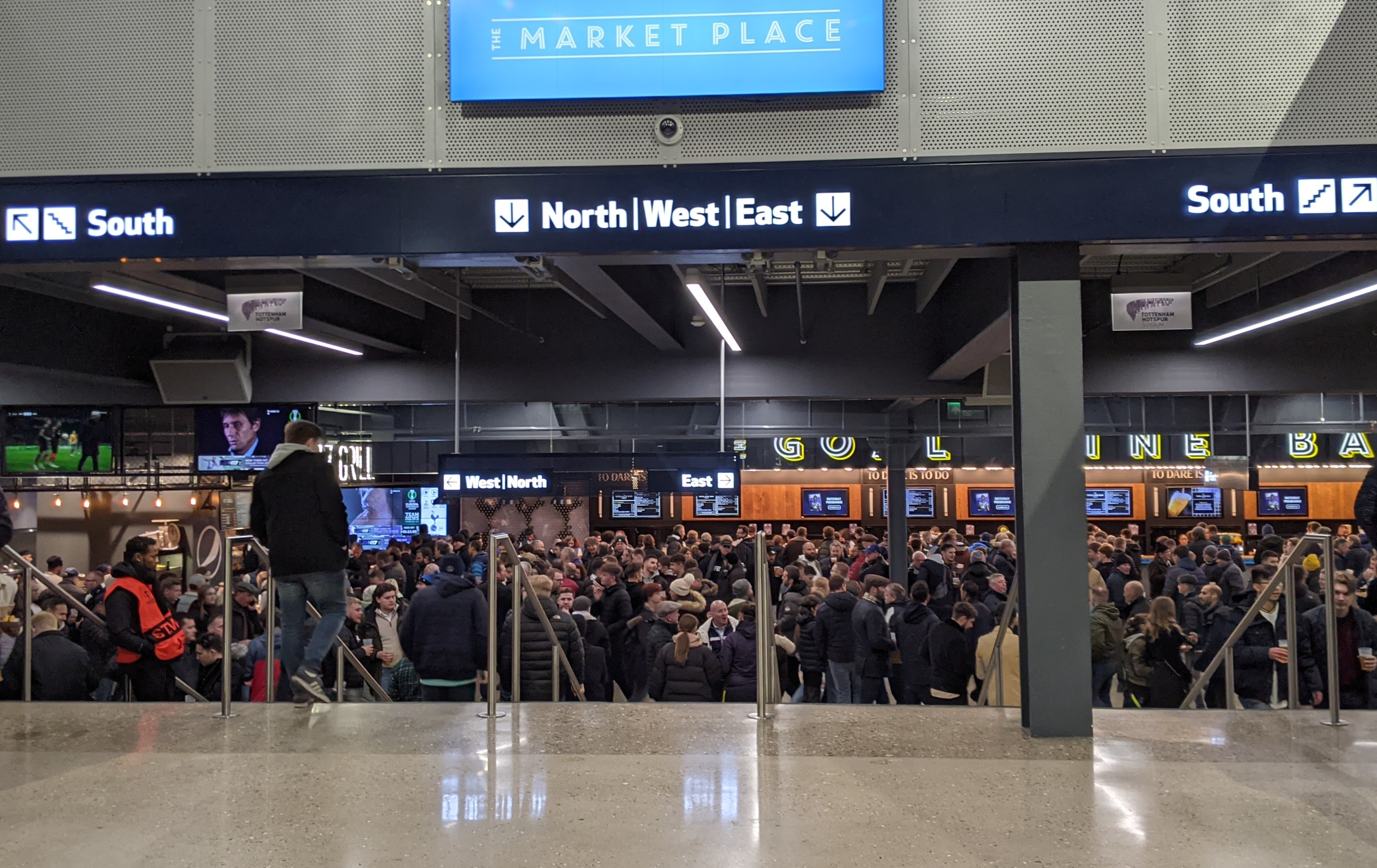
The Market Place under the South Stand

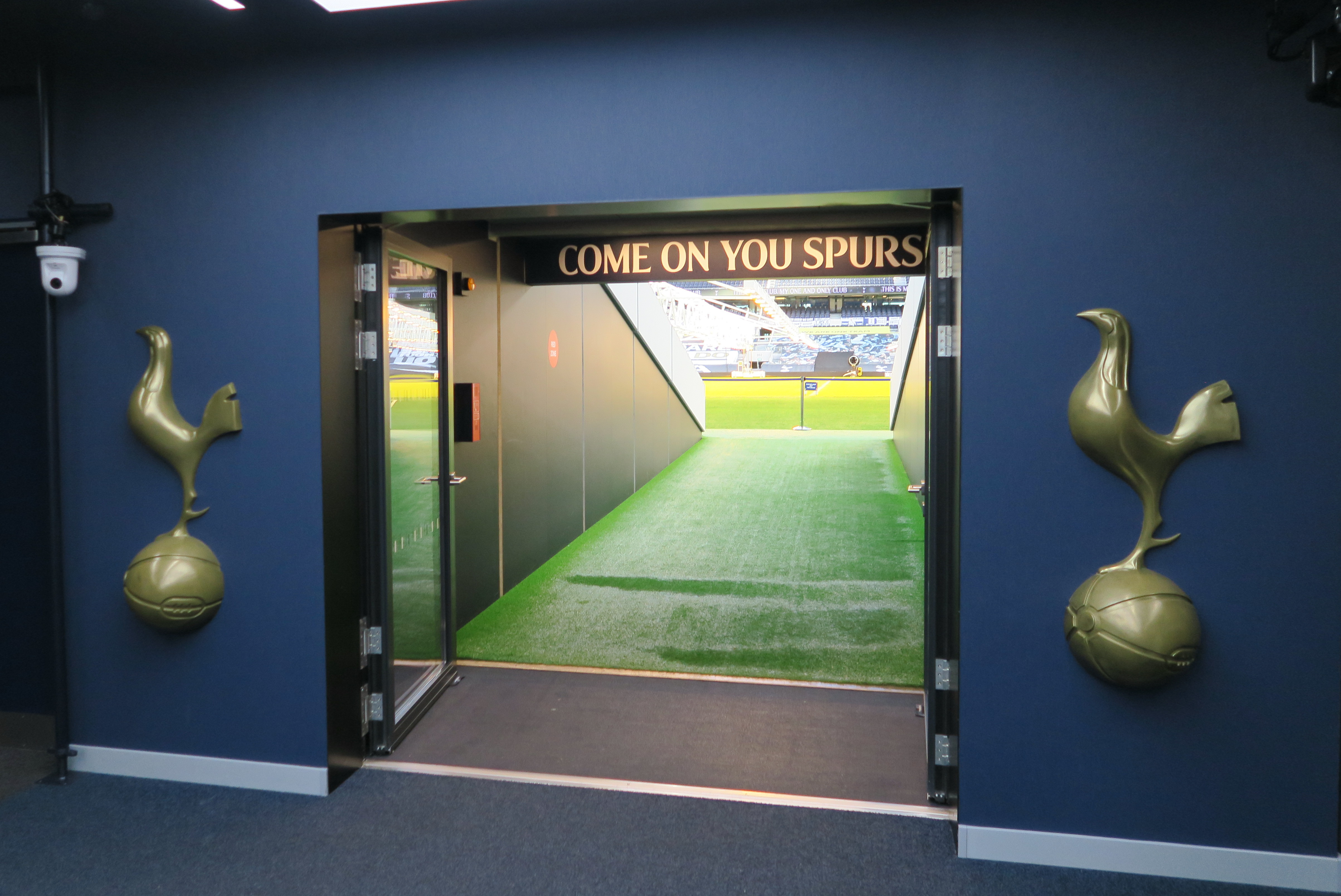
Players tunnel

The stadium is intended to be active all year round as a sports and entertainment destination with conference and banqueting facilities. It offers visitor attractions such as a 'Dare Skywalk' opened on 31 August 2020; visitors may walk up the side of the stadium to the roof, then over a glass walkway around the golden cockerel above the South Stand where they may view the goal line from the roof, or abseil down to the south podium from a viewing deck. The East Stand includes a double-height banquet hall that may be used for conference events. To the south of the stadium, the raised podium forms a large open public square that may be used for a range of sporting and community activities. The Tottenham Experience, which includes a club shop, club archive and museum on Tottenham High Road, serves as the arrivals hub for visitors, where they may collect tickets and start a tour of the stadium. The museum is located in the Grade II listed Warmington House, and the new club shop is the largest in Europe, featuring a 100-seat auditorium area that may be used for pre-match experiences. On the northwest corner is M cafe, a media room that may be open to the public and used as a cafe on non-match days. On 23 July 2021, the OOF art gallery opened. The gallery occupies the Grade II listed Warmington House within the stadium and is accessed through the club shop. Other facilities may be offered in ancillary buildings surrounding the stadium, including a ticket office, and a planned extreme sports building as well as a community health centre.

=== Statuary ===
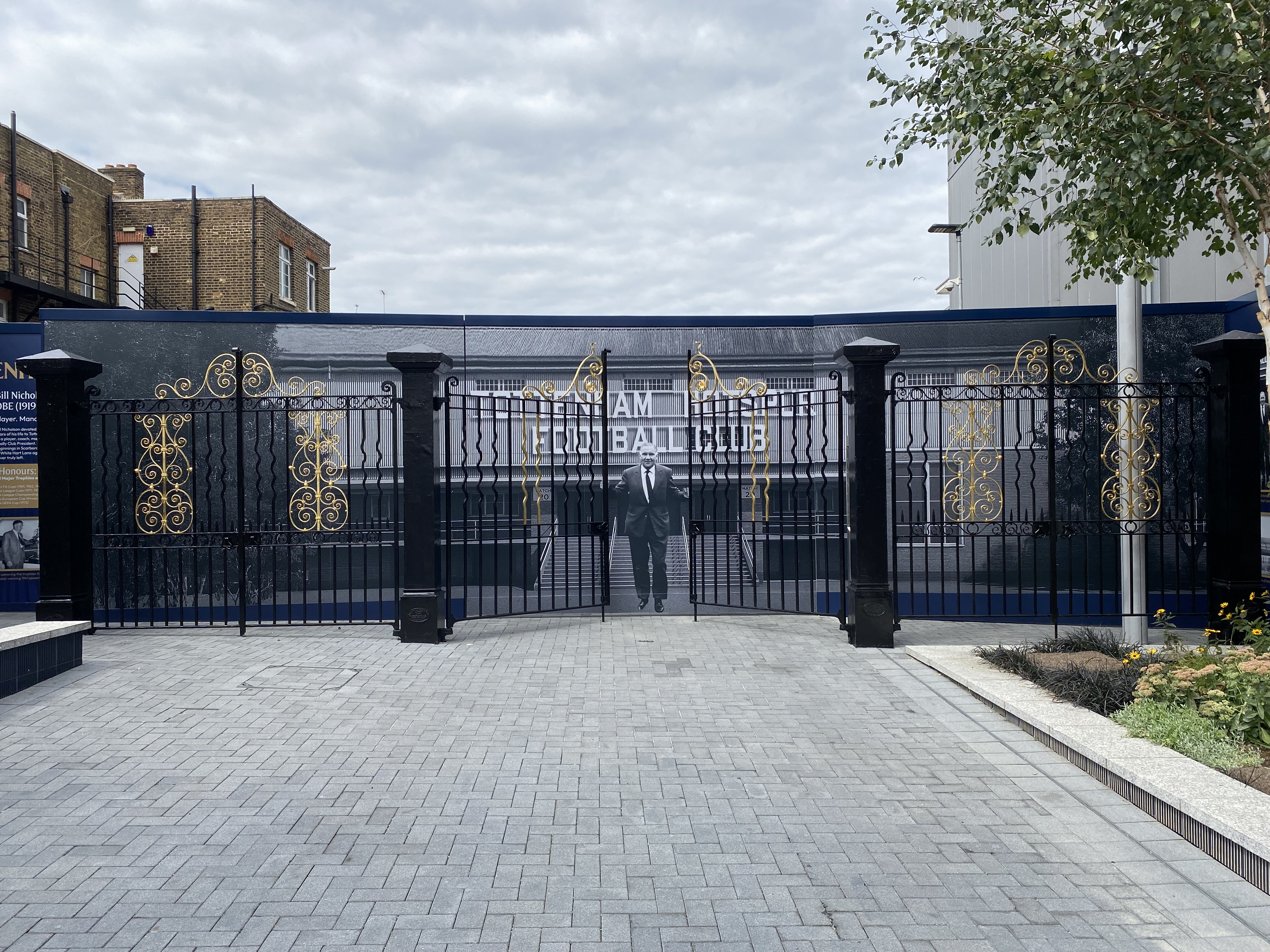
The Bill Nicholson Gates in August 2025

A 4.5-m-tall and near-double-sized fibreglass replica of the spurs cockerel, originally created in 1909 to sit atop the west stand at White Hart Lane, was placed on the roof structure above the South Stand on 6 November 2018. It is a faithful replica of the original, including dents caused by Paul Gascoigne when he shot at it with an air rifle.

The main gates to the White Hart Lane stadium became known as the Bill Nicholson Gates after a photograph by Peter Robinson was published in the 1970s and featured Nicholson standing between the wrought iron gates. These were removed for safe-keeping in 2015 before the construction of the new stadium but were reinstated at the Tottenham Hotspur Stadium in July 2025, at the PAXTON17 area between the Ticket Office and the buildings at the north of the stadium. Originally intended to be a statue, an image of Nicholson is placed on hoarding behind the gates, there is a photo opportunity for fans as well as a lasting tribute to the former Tottenham Hotspur manager.

== Uses ==
The stadium's overarching use is as the home venue of Tottenham Hotspur, who play all their Premier League and cup home matches at the ground. However, the stadium is also used for other football events; in its first year, it was used for a live screening of the 2019 UEFA Champions League Final, select Under-23s games, as well as the first North London derby in the FA Women's Super League between Tottenham and Arsenal held on 17 November 2019. The stadium has since hosted a number of home games for Tottenham's women's team.

The stadium is intended to be used for a number of purposes aside from association football, serving as the venue for NFL games and other events. It can host up to 16 non-association football events a year, at least two of which will be NFL games. This was later proposed to be increased to 30 after Beyoncé's fifth show during her Renaissance World Tour caused the stadium to breach their licensing agreement and Haringey Council approved the move in 2024.

=== NFL London Games ===
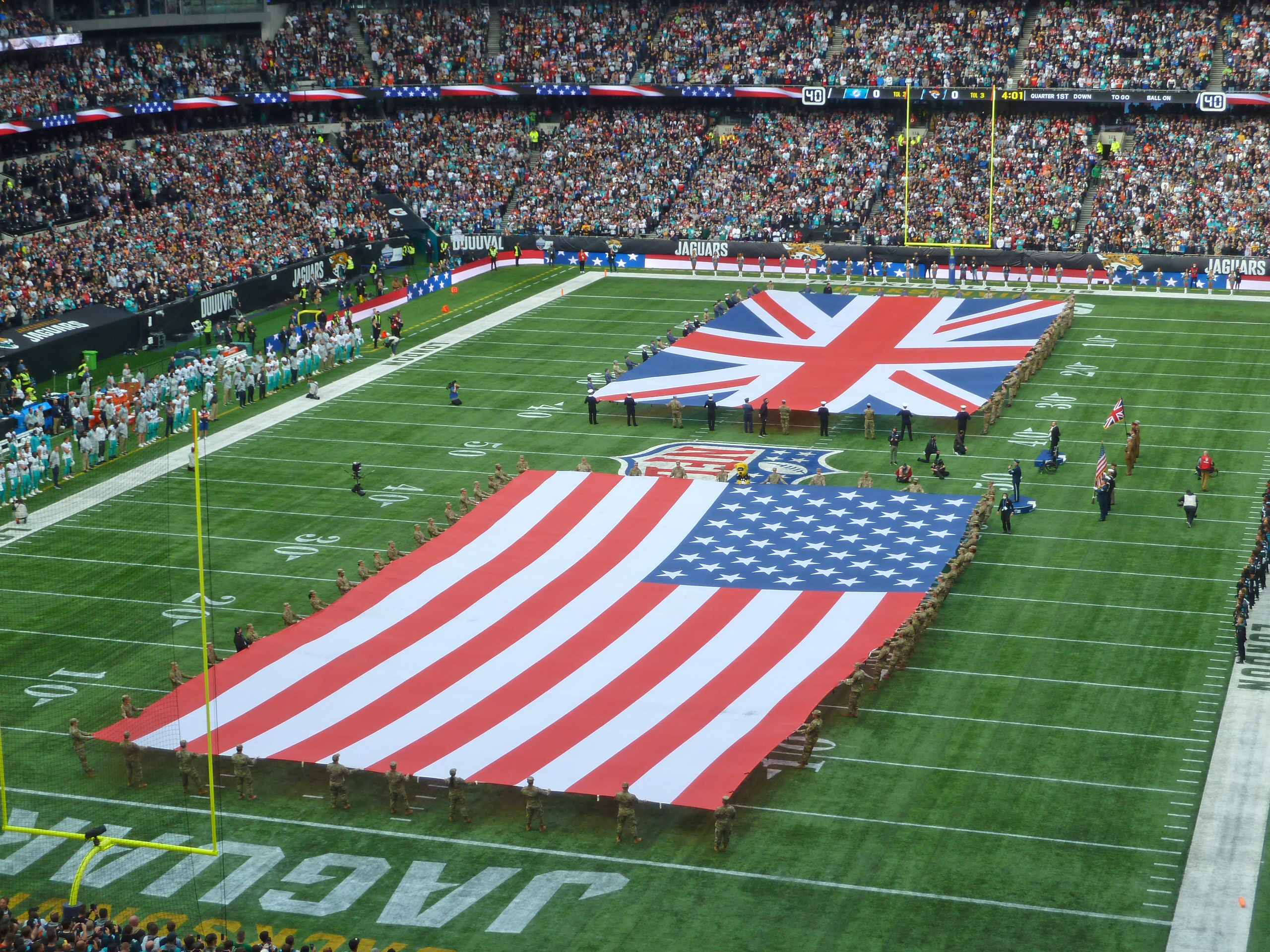
Dolphins v Jaguars getting ready to start at the stadium in 2021

Tottenham Hotspur Stadium is the first and only stadium to be designed specially for NFL games outside of North America and is officially the home of the NFL in the UK. The first game at the stadium took place on 6 October 2019 when the Chicago Bears played against the Oakland Raiders. A record crowd of 60,463 watched the Raiders win a close game 24–21. The following week, the Tampa Bay Buccaneers hosted the Carolina Panthers on 13 October.

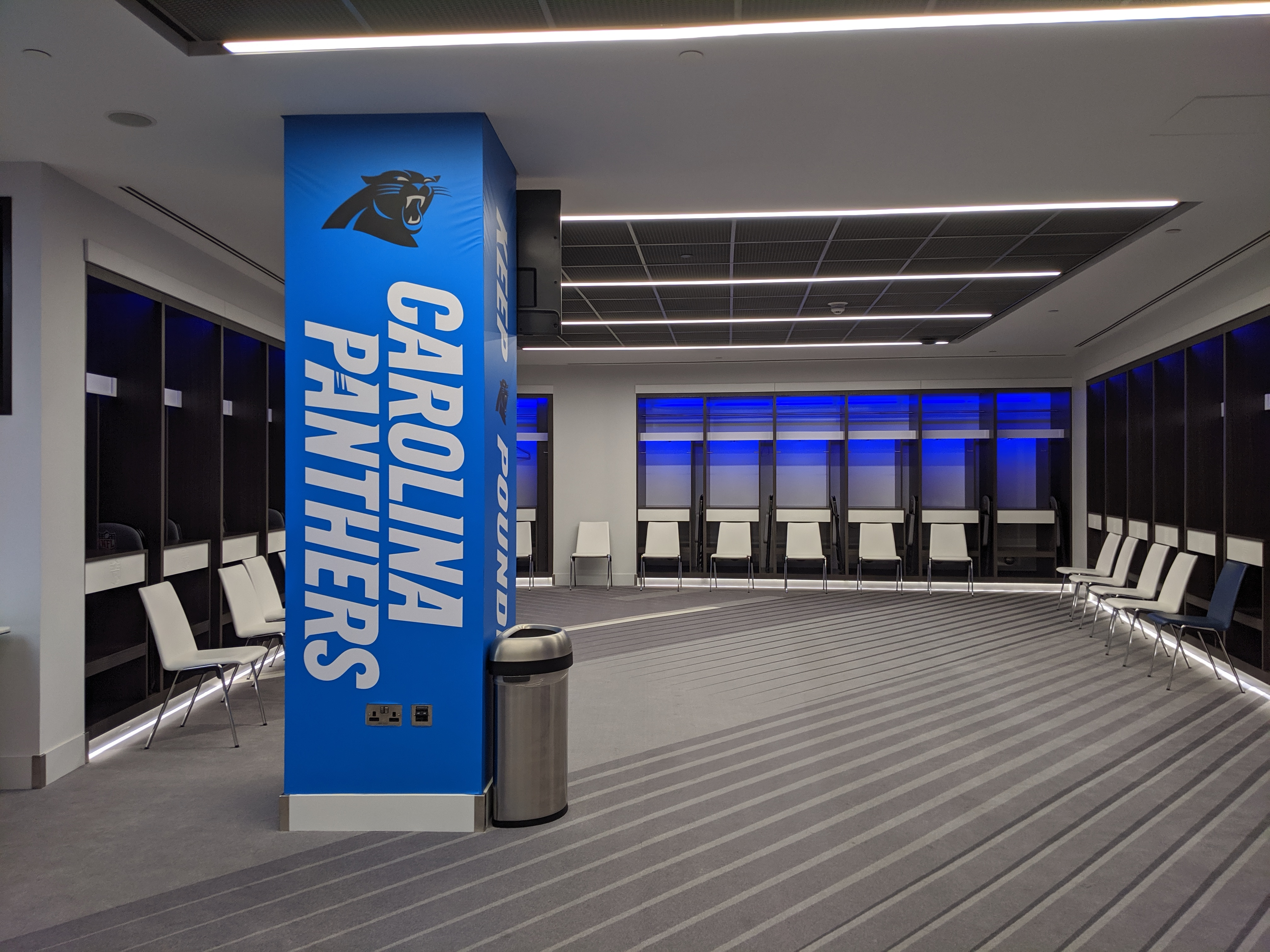
Logo of Carolina Panthers at Tottenham Hotspur Stadium

The first touchdown at the stadium was scored by Josh Jacobs. A number of NFL events were held at the stadium before the first game, including the trials for the first intake of the NFL Academy was launched at the stadium on 2 July 2019.

The NFL returned in 2021 after the 2020 games were cancelled due to the COVID-19 pandemic, with the Atlanta Falcons hosting the New York Jets on 10 October 2021, and the Jacksonville Jaguars hosting the Miami Dolphins the following week on 17 October, with Atlanta and Jacksonville winning. Prior to cancellation of the games in 2020 both Miami and Atlanta were due to host games at Tottenham Hotspur Stadium and Jacksonville were scheduled to host two games at Wembley Stadium.

The venue hosted two regular season games in October 2022. The New Orleans Saints hosted the Minnesota Vikings and the Green Bay Packers hosted the New York Giants. This was the first time the Green Bay Packers played a game abroad. The NFL returned to the Stadium for two regular season games in October 2023. The Buffalo Bills hosted the Jacksonville Jaguars who played at Wembley Stadium against the Atlanta Falcons the week before, making this the first time an NFL team has played back to back in London. Buffalo's new Highmark Stadium (also designed by Populous) then under construction at the time, was reported to have been inspired by the design of Tottenham Hotspur Stadium. The Tennessee Titans would then host the Baltimore Ravens the week after.

==== NFL Flag ====
The first UK regional flag football championships for schoolchildren aged 8–11 were held 3 July 2019. Twelve schools, 180 young athletes, playing their part in the stadium's first ever competitive NFL games. Houghton Primary School from Godmanchester beat Ysgol Gwynedd School from Flintshire 32–31.

=== International football ===
The stadium is one of the stadiums chosen to stage the matches of UEFA Euro 2028 to be held in the United Kingdom and Ireland, where it will host four group stage matches and one round of 16 match.

=== Rugby league ===
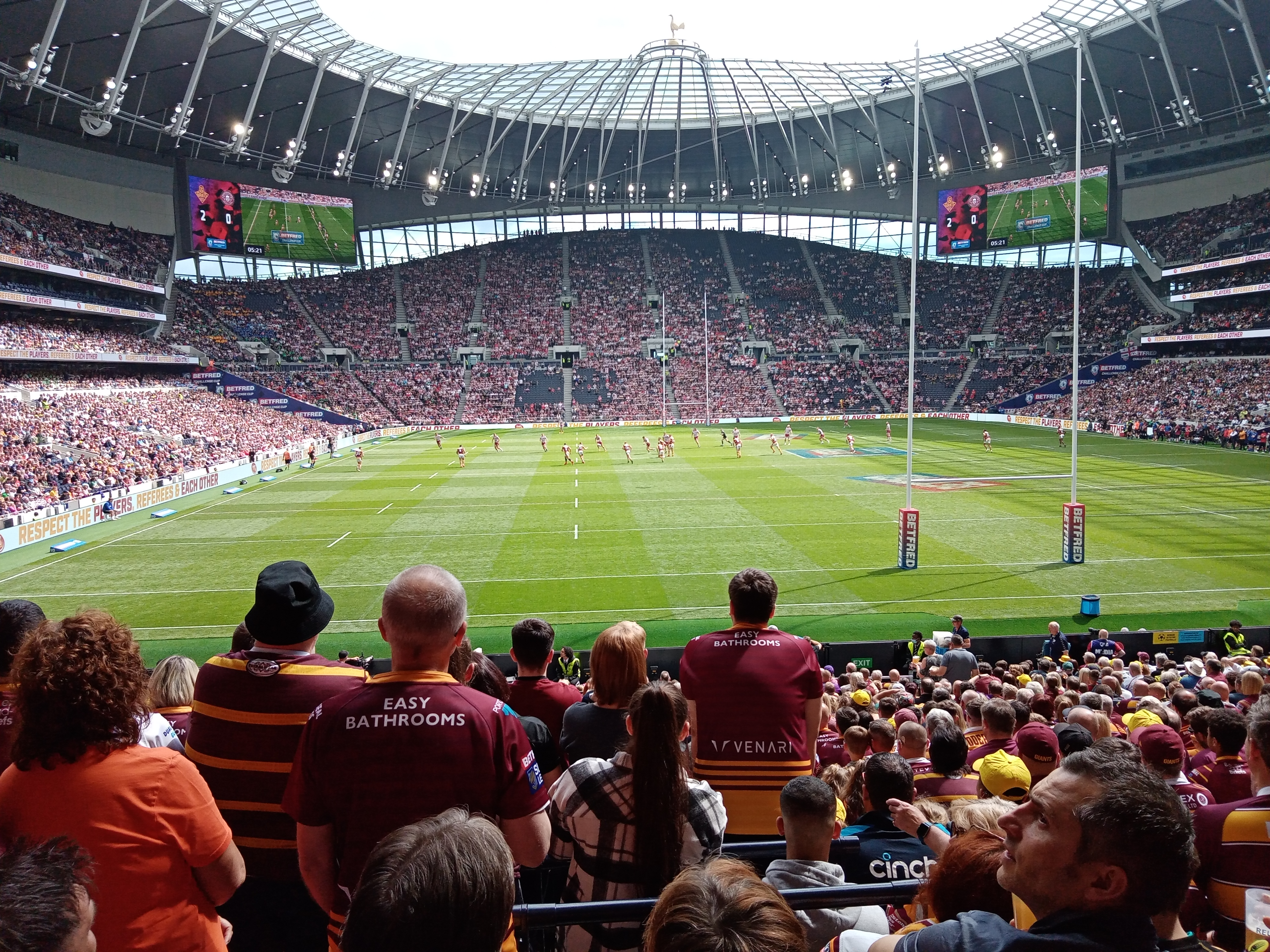
2022 Challenge Cup final

The Tottenham Hotspur Stadium was selected to host a match of the 2020 Kangaroo tour between England and Australia, however the tour was cancelled due to the COVID-19 pandemic. The first rugby league game at the stadium came two years later with the 2022 RFL 1895 Cup final played on 28 May 2022 between Leigh Centurions and Featherstone Rovers, the competition is for professional clubs below the Super League and is played as a curtain raiser to the Challenge Cup Final. The 2022 Challenge Cup final between Huddersfield Giants and Wigan Warriors was played following Leigh's victory in the 1895 Cup. Both played at the Tottenham Hotspur Stadium instead of their traditional home of Wembley Stadium due to Wembley holding the EFL play-offs, with the move to May a result of a BBC broadcasting conflict in the usual month of the final in August. Wigan won the cup final 16–14 in front of 51,628 fans.

=== Rugby union ===
The Premiership Rugby club Saracens agreed to play their annual showpiece game at the stadium for five years, starting in 2020. However, the first match originally scheduled for 28 March 2020 was cancelled due to the COVID-19 pandemic. Saracens eventually played their first match at the stadium on 26 March 2022, when they defeated Bristol Bears. Saracens' showdown against Harlequins drew a crowd of 61,214 in March 2024.

In May 2024, the stadium hosted both the European Rugby Champions Cup and European Rugby Challenge Cup finals. With Toulouse defeating Leinster in front of 61,531 fans and Sharks defeating Gloucester in front of 34,761 fans.

=== Hockey ===
Tottenham Hotspur Stadium was proposed as one of four venues for a joint bid for the 2026 Men's FIH Hockey World Cup.

=== Concerts ===
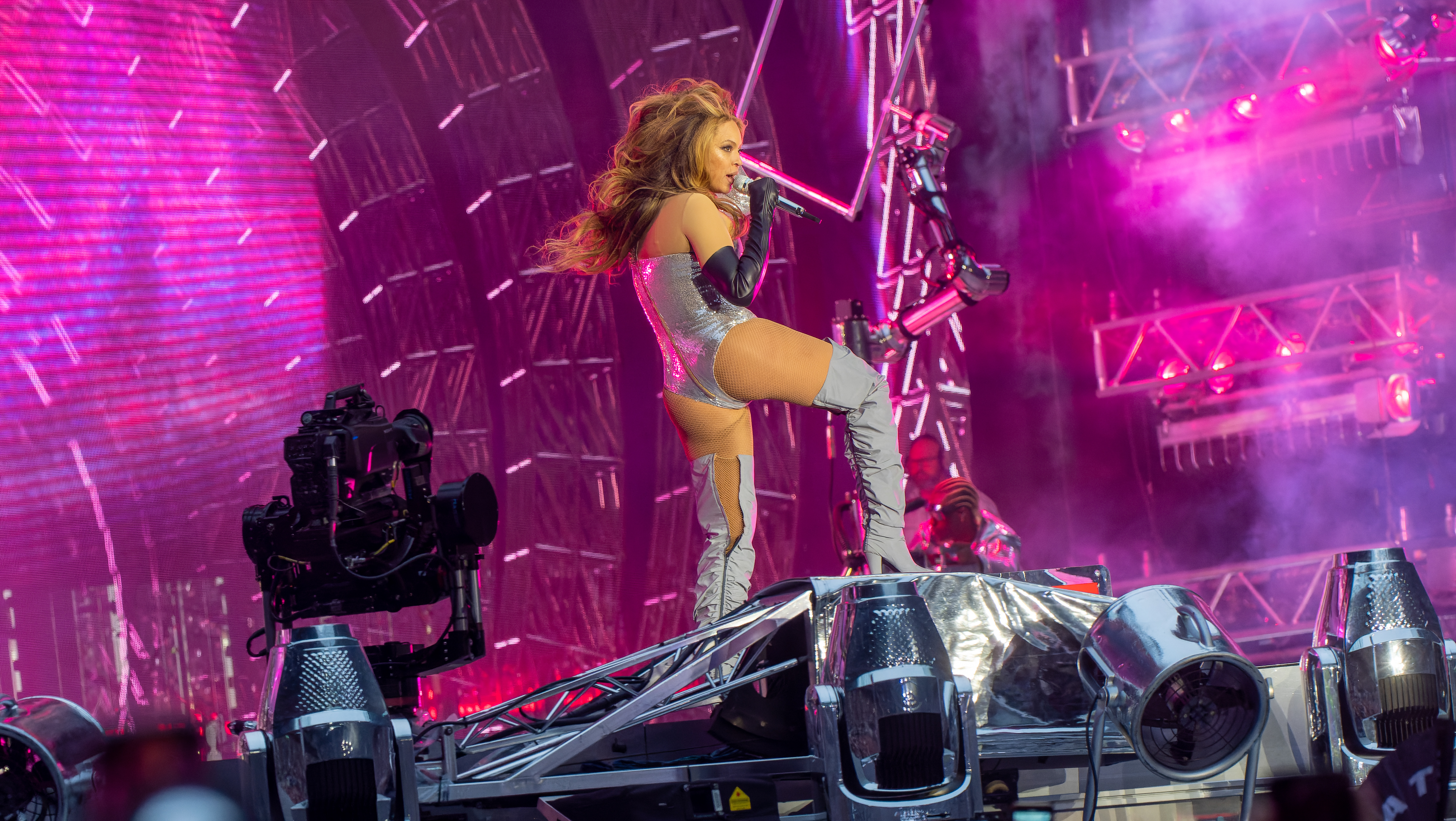
Beyoncé at the stadium in 2023

The stadium was originally permitted to hold up to six music concerts a year but the limit was lifted in 2023 and the stadium can now host concerts within the maximum of 30 major non-football events. The football pitch is retracted with the artificial pitch used for concerts.

The first artists scheduled to perform at the stadium were Guns N' Roses, originally to be in 2020 as part of the European leg of their Guns N' Roses 2020 Tour but delayed until 1–2 July 2022 due to Covid. Other artists who have performed at the stadium include Lady Gaga and Beyoncé, whose five shows as part of her Renaissance Tour in 2023 produced an aggregate attendance of 240,330. Beyoncé returned for a six-night mini-residency in 2025, as part of her Cowboy Carter Tour bringing another 275,399 attendees, a record audience at the stadium.

List of entertainment events held at Tottenham Hotspur Stadium
Date	Performer(s)	Event	Opening Act(s)	Attendance	Revenue	Additional notes
2022
July 1	Guns N' Roses	We're F'N' Back! Tour	Gary Clark Jr.	92,762 / 95,213	$11,265,674	These shows were originally scheduled for May 29 and 30, 2020.
July 2	Guns N' Roses	We're F'N' Back! Tour	Gary Clark Jr.	92,762 / 95,213	$11,265,674	These shows were originally scheduled for May 29 and 30, 2020.
July 29	Lady Gaga	The Chromatica Ball	—	86,508 / 86,508	$9,638,047	The show of July 29, 2022 was previously scheduled for July 30, 2020, and July 30, 2021.
July 30	Lady Gaga	The Chromatica Ball	—	86,508 / 86,508	$9,638,047	The show of July 29, 2022 was previously scheduled for July 30, 2020, and July 30, 2021.
2023
May 29	Beyoncé	Renaissance World Tour	—	240,330 / 240,330	$38,986,169	—
May 30	Beyoncé	Renaissance World Tour	—	240,330 / 240,330	$38,986,169	—
June 1	Beyoncé	Renaissance World Tour	—	240,330 / 240,330	$38,986,169	—
June 3	Beyoncé	Renaissance World Tour	—	240,330 / 240,330	$38,986,169	—
June 4	Beyoncé	Renaissance World Tour	—	240,330 / 240,330	$38,986,169	—
July 21	Red Hot Chili Peppers	Unlimited Love Tour	The Roots; King Princess	42,599 / 42,599	$6,746,727	—
July 29	Wizkid	More Love, Less Ego Tour	—			
2024
July 11	Travis Scott	Circus Maximus Tour	Yung Lean	46,963 / 46,963	$6,548,419	—
June 15	Pink	Summer Carnival	Gayle; KidCutUp; The Script	102,031 / 102,031	$14,641,652	—
June 16	Pink	Summer Carnival	Gayle; KidCutUp; The Script	102,031 / 102,031	$14,641,652	—
2025
June 5	Beyoncé	Cowboy Carter Tour	—	275,399 / 275,399	$61,580,067	Highest gross ever ($61.6 million). Highest attendance ever (275,399). Most career performances by any artist (11 shows).
June 7	Beyoncé	Cowboy Carter Tour	—	275,399 / 275,399	$61,580,067	Highest gross ever ($61.6 million). Highest attendance ever (275,399). Most career performances by any artist (11 shows).
June 10	Beyoncé	Cowboy Carter Tour	—	275,399 / 275,399	$61,580,067	Highest gross ever ($61.6 million). Highest attendance ever (275,399). Most career performances by any artist (11 shows).
June 12	Beyoncé	Cowboy Carter Tour	—	275,399 / 275,399	$61,580,067	Highest gross ever ($61.6 million). Highest attendance ever (275,399). Most career performances by any artist (11 shows).
June 14	Beyoncé	Cowboy Carter Tour	—	275,399 / 275,399	$61,580,067	Highest gross ever ($61.6 million). Highest attendance ever (275,399). Most career performances by any artist (11 shows).
June 16	Beyoncé	Cowboy Carter Tour	—	275,399 / 275,399	$61,580,067	Highest gross ever ($61.6 million). Highest attendance ever (275,399). Most career performances by any artist (11 shows).
June 21	Chris Brown	Breezy Bowl XX	Bryson Tiller	96,981 / 96,981	$13,787,320	—
June 22	Chris Brown	Breezy Bowl XX	Bryson Tiller	96,981 / 96,981	$13,787,320	—
July 3	50 Cent; Mary J. Blige; Davido	—				
July 18	Stray Kids	dominATE World Tour	—	90,000	—	
July 19	Stray Kids	dominATE World Tour	—	90,000	—	
July 22	Kendrick Lamar; SZA	Grand National Tour	Mustard	91,352 / 91,352	$16,946,625	—
July 23	Kendrick Lamar; SZA	Grand National Tour	Mustard	91,352 / 91,352	$16,946,625	—
July 25	Imagine Dragons	Loom World Tour	Declan McKenna	—		
July 26	Imagine Dragons	Loom World Tour	Declan McKenna	—		
September 20	Post Malone	Big Ass Stadium Tour	Jelly Roll	—		These shows were originally scheduled for September 7 and 8.
September 21	Post Malone	Big Ass Stadium Tour	Jelly Roll	—		These shows were originally scheduled for September 7 and 8.
2026
June 16	Zach Bryan	With Heaven on Tour	Dijon; Fey Fili	—		
June 16	Zach Bryan	With Heaven on Tour	Dijon; Fey Fili	—		
June 20	Gorillaz	The Mountain Tour	Sparks & Trueno	—		
June 27	Bad Bunny	Debí Tirar Más Fotos World Tour	—	104,128 / 104,128	$20,064,652	—
June 28	Bad Bunny	Debí Tirar Más Fotos World Tour	—	104,128 / 104,128	$20,064,652	—
July 6	BTS	Arirang World Tour	—	130,000	$24,700,000	—
July 7	BTS	Arirang World Tour	—	130,000	$24,700,000	—
July 13	System of a Down	2026 UK & European Tour	Queens of the Stone Age; Acid Bath	—		
July 15	System of a Down	2026 UK & European Tour	Queens of the Stone Age; Acid Bath	—		
September 4	Jay-Z	Jay-Z 30 Tour	—			
September 5	Jay-Z	Jay-Z 30 Tour	—			
September 26	Bigbang	XX: Cosmos World Tour	—			
2027
July 6	Karol G	Viajando Por El Mundo Tropitour		—		
July 13	Stray Kids	Run It World Tour		—		

=== Boxing ===
The stadium was initially to host the Anthony Joshua vs. Kubrat Pulev for the heavyweight world titles for its first bout on 20 June 2020 but it was postponed and rescheduled elsewhere due to the pandemic.

The first boxing bout hosted by the stadium was the Anthony Joshua vs. Oleksandr Usyk match on 25 September 2021 between Joshua, defending his WBA (super), IBF, WBO, and IBO belts, and Usyk, the former undisputed cruiserweight champion fighting his third bout at Heavyweight. Usyk defeated Joshua by unanimous decision in front of a crowd of 65,000.

On 3 December 2022, in the bout between Tyson Fury and Derek Chisora at the stadium, Fury defeated Chisora by technical knockout in the 10th round of their trilogy in front of a crowd of 59,789.

On 26 April 2025, the Chris Eubank Jr vs. Conor Benn match was held at the stadium attended by 67,484 spectators. Eubank Jr won the fight by unanimous decision.

On 15 November 2025, Chris Eubank Jr vs Conor Benn 2 was held at the stadium in front of 65,000. Benn won the fight by unanimous decision.

On 11 April 2026, Tyson Fury vs. Arslanbek Makhmudov was held at the stadium in front of 64,500. Fury won the fight by unanimous decision.

=== Go-karting ===
A go-karting track was built under the South Stand, after a 15-year motorsport deal was signed with Formula One. It is the world's first in-stadium electric karting facility and the track is accredited by the National Karting Association that allows it to host races for karting championship. A driver academy programme is also planned. Three track layouts are available designed to suit racers of different ages and ability. The facility opened on 6 February 2024.

=== Other uses ===
During the COVID-19 pandemic, the stadium became the first community hub to be opened for the delivery of food to vulnerable Londoners. It was also the first to be used as a centre for drive-through COVID-19 testing, and the Women's Outpatient Services of the North Middlesex University Hospital was relocated to the stadium to free up hospital capacity as well as keeping pregnant women away from the hospital.

== Attendance ==
The stadium initially had a capacity of 62,062, which was then increased in stages to 62,850. Due to the need to segregate fans, the full capacity may never be reached for association football matches as some seats are deliberately kept unused. Attendance at this stadium is counted by the actual number of fans going through the gates, in contrast to the number of tickets issued which is the method used in many grounds such as the Emirates as well as Spurs at Wembley where attendance figures may include season ticket holders who did not turn up for matches and unused free tickets. The first match after its official opening, although sold out, was attended by 59,215 fans as some rows of seating were kept empty and some premium areas were not yet opened. Attendance in the first season at the stadium averaged at 59,175 from the seven home matches played there, compared to 54,216 for all home matches that season, most of which were played at Wembley, a stadium with a higher capacity.

The official stadium record attendance for a Tottenham game currently stands at 62,027 in the English Premier League match against Arsenal on 12 May 2022, beating the previous record of 61,104 against Chelsea on 22 December 2019. The previous highest attendance for any game was the first NFL game held at the stadium on 6 October 2019 between Chicago Bears and Oakland Raiders, which was watched by 60,463 spectators. The highest attendance for an NFL game is 61,273 for the game between Buffalo Bills and Jacksonville Jaguars that took place on 8 October 2023. It recorded what was at the time the highest ever attendance for a Women's Super League match at 38,262 in the match against Arsenal Women held on 17 November 2019.

== Cost, finance and sponsorship ==
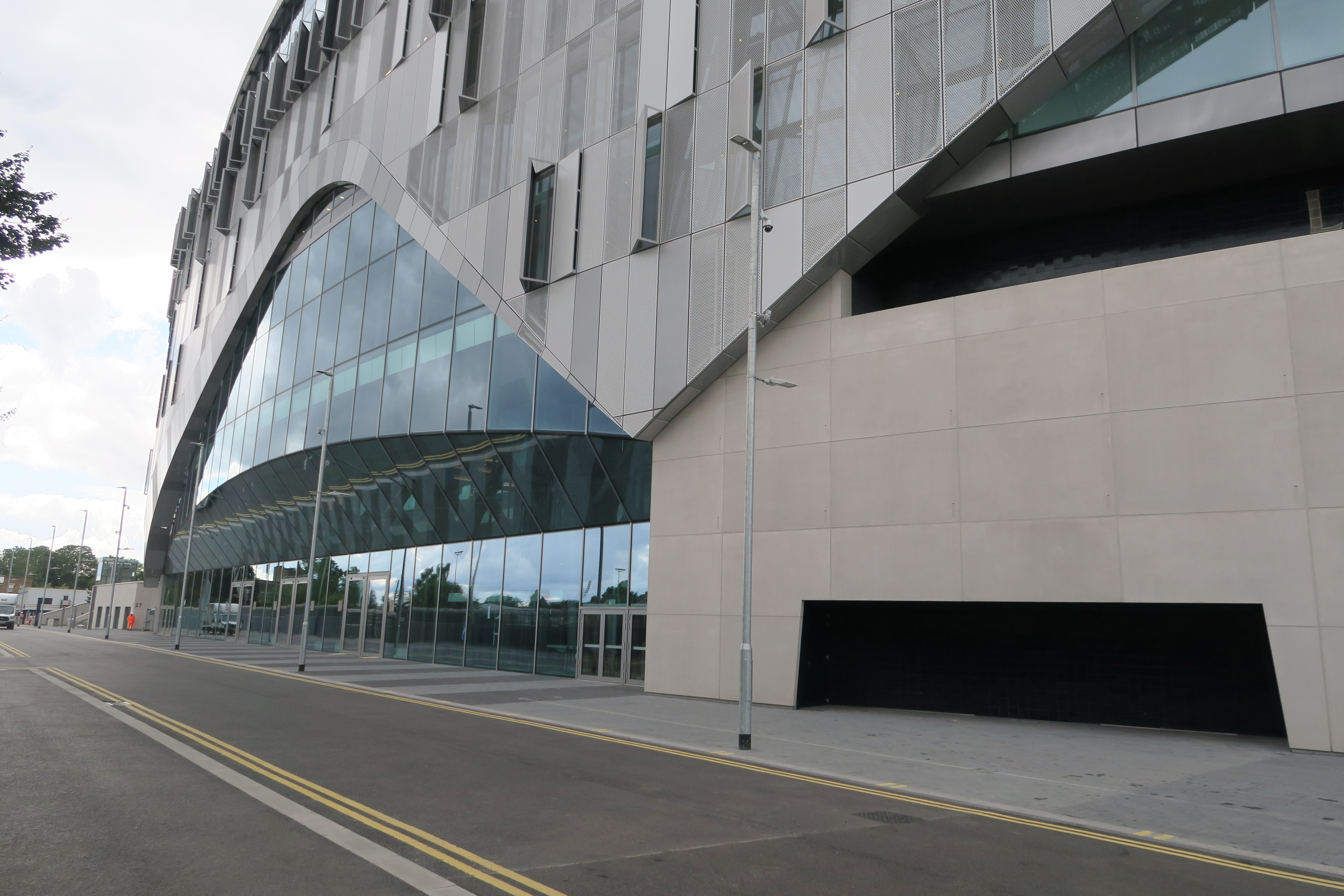
East entrance on Worcester Avenue

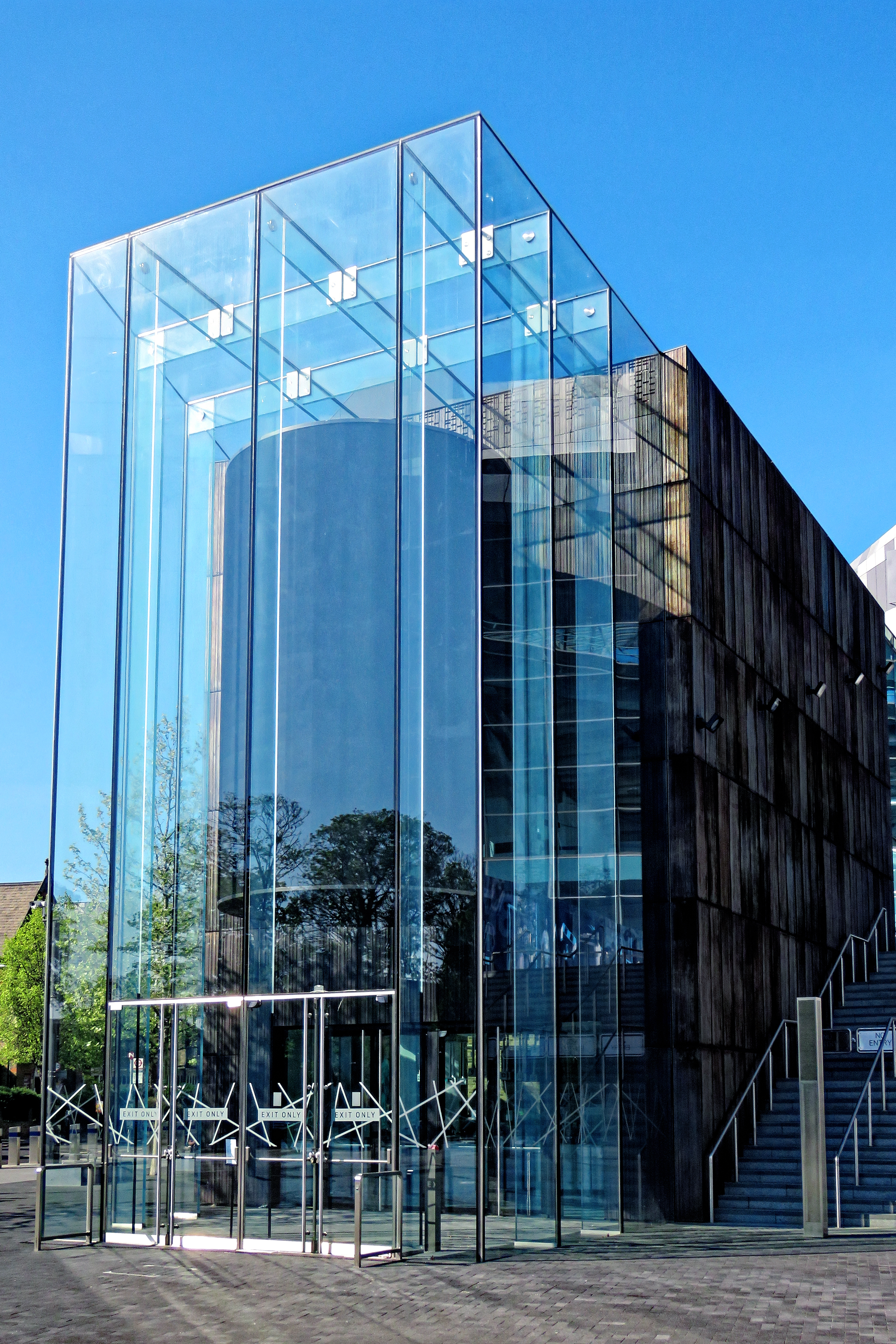
View from south

An early estimate put Phase 2 of the development, that includes the construction of the stadium, at £305 million, but in July 2018, it was reported that the construction of the stadium itself was projected to cost £350–£400 million, out of the estimated £850 million cost for the entire Northumberland Development Project. The cost had increased due to the higher cost of import by at least 15% caused by the Brexit vote on the exchange rate, changes to the build, overtime working, extra hirings and higher construction costs. The club said that the final cost would be less than £1 billion, and just before the stadium opened in April 2019, the club chairman Daniel Levy said that the cost is of the order of £1 billion. In November 2020, Levy indicated that the stadium build had cost £1.2 billion.

The project was financed through a combination of the club's own resources, bank loans and club revenues. A £200 million interim financing facility was arranged in December 2015 with three banks to finance the project. This was replaced in May 2017 by a £400 million, five-year loan, deal with the banks to fund the remaining build. By this stage, £340 million had already been spent on land acquisition and the planning process, as well as the construction cost; £100 million of this came from the 2015 interim financing, with the rest from club resources. However, with costs spiralling, the club was forced to borrow an extra £237 million, raising the financing facility to £637m. The debt will be repaid over a 23-year period at £30 million a season. In order to reduce debt-servicing costs and improve annual cash flow, £525 million of the debt was refinanced by issuing bonds that will mature in 15 to 30 years' time. The bond issue was arranged by Bank of America Merrill Lynch, which also provided a £112m loan. The club aims to pay for the stadium through a number of means: income from ticket sales is forecast to increase to £100 million per year, more than twice that earned from White Hart Lane; revenues from other sports hosted at the stadium with the NFL contributing £10 million to the initial cost; increased hospitality and catering income, as well as sponsorship, merchandising, advertising, concession and digital rights, and broadcast revenues.

In June 2020, during the COVID-19 pandemic, the club had to secure a £175m loan from the Bank of England due to the loss of expected revenue streams as matches and scheduled events such as concerts at the stadium had to be cancelled. In February 2021, a financial analysis indicated that the club had the biggest debt amongst all European clubs. The great portion of the estimated £1.177 billion debt was due to the construction of the stadium.

=== Partnership and deals ===
The club has a number of partners at the stadium. Following on tradition, Heineken, who have previously held sponsorship deals, have been named as the beer sponsor for the new stadium. The north London brewer Beavertown is the official craft beer supplier and it installed the world's first stadium-located microbrewery on the south east corner of the stadium. The company selected by the club to supply the advertising system in the new ground was TGI. Tottenham signed a contract with LG to supply the new stadium with "ultra-premium" TVs and digital signage. Hewlett Packard Enterprise is the IT networking and wireless infrastructure partner for the new stadium. The concessions for food and drink in the stadium are run by Levy, a subsidiary of Compass.

=== Naming rights ===
The stadium will remain named Tottenham Hotspur Stadium until a naming rights agreement is reached. The club is apparently seeking offers in excess of £20m annually (£400 million for a 20-year deal or £200 million for 10 years), or £25 million in a 15-year deal (£375 million).

=== Economic impact ===
The club estimates that the stadium will inject around £293 million a year into the community in Tottenham, and create more than 1,700 new jobs out of the total of 3,500 jobs created when the project is complete.

== Reception ==
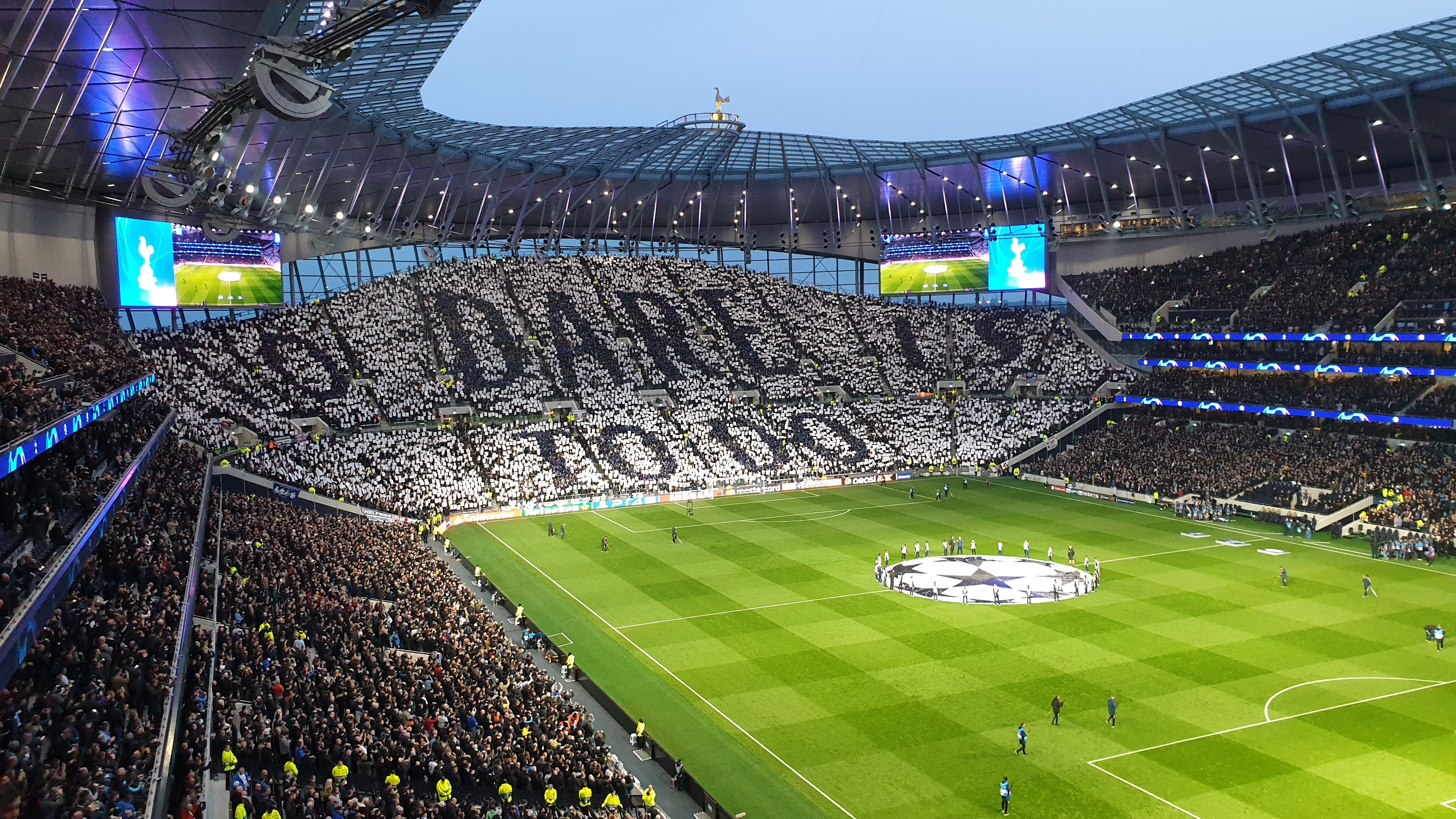
The South Stand, also known as the Park Lane end, before the UEFA Champions League quarter-final with Manchester City F.C. on 9 April 2019, with fans displaying the club motto 'To Dare Is to Do'.

The new stadium has received generally positive comments from fans as well as sports and architecture writers alike. Paul Hayward of The Telegraph described it as "imposing and extravagant, yes, but still true to Tottenham Hotspur's spirit and raison d'être". The Observer's architecture critic Rowan Moore, despite being unimpressed by the "ugliness" of its external appearance, chose it as one of the top five buildings of 2019, arguing that the stadium is at its best as a venue for watching football, and that it has achieved "the desired combination of magnificence and intimacy". Similarly David Hytner of The Guardian noted that while the stadium is significantly larger, it still has the "feeling of intimacy" due to the closeness of the stands to the pitch, and that the design of the stadium has managed to "retain the feel of the old White Hart Lane". Henry Winter of The Times offered the opinion that the new stadium has shown the other clubs "the quality of spec required" for a new stadium, and one that can produce the loudest sound for the fans. He also noted the significance of the new stadium within the community in Tottenham by helping to regenerate a deprived area blighted by riots, becoming a stadium that is "a must-see stop on those touring London's architectural splendours" and one should be a source of pride "for all in the game".

In a survey of 4,302 fans organised by Tottenham Hotspur Supporters' Trust, 95% were satisfied with their experience attending games at the new stadium, compared to 52% of fans who were satisfied while Tottenham were playing at Wembley Stadium. 84% of those were satisfied with the atmosphere at the stadium for league game, rising to 98% for European games.

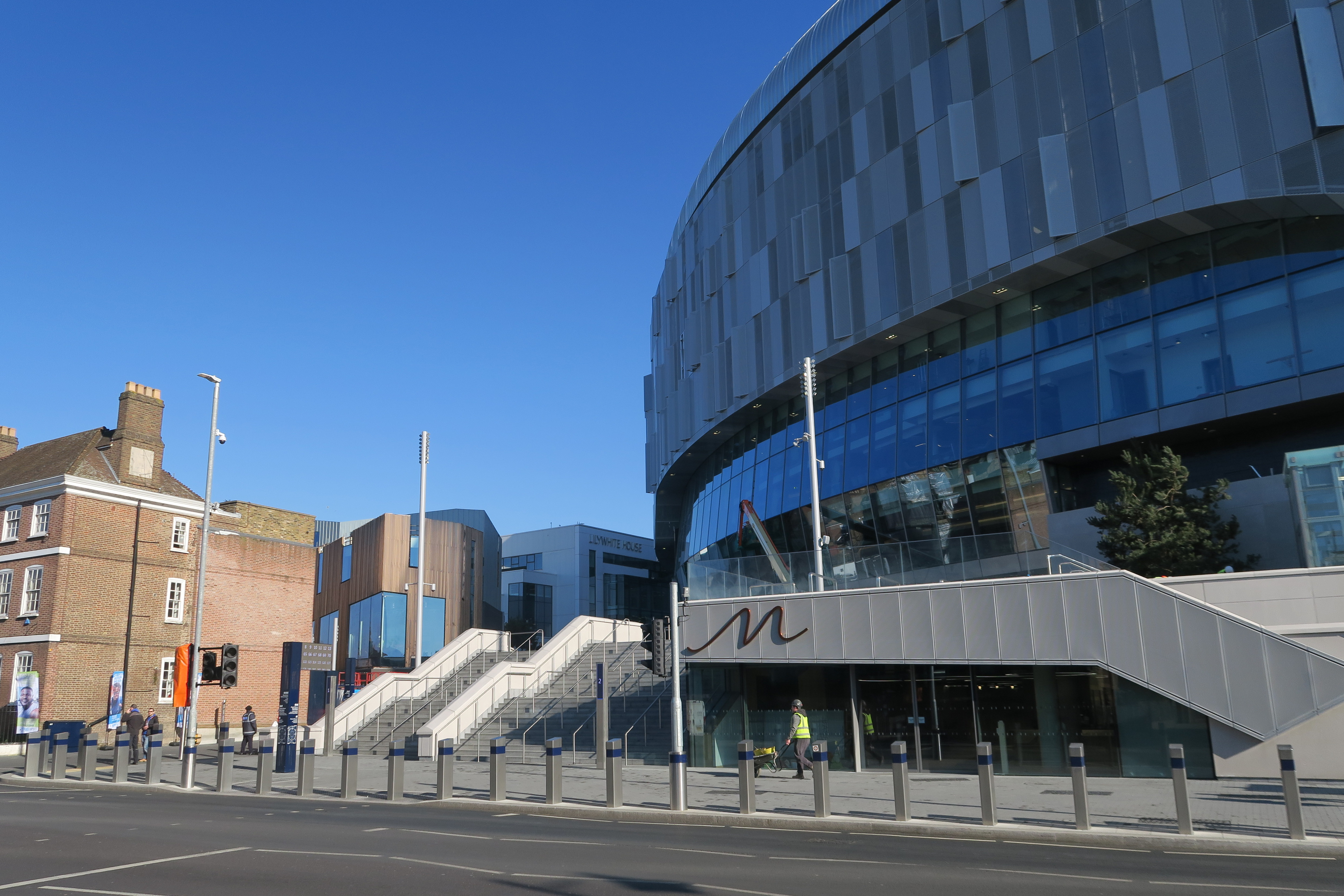
Northwest corner of stadium, with access to the north podium, the Paxton ticket office and a cafe

The stadium won the Supreme Award for Structural Engineering Excellence in the Structural Awards from the Institution of Structural Engineers in 2019. It also won in the Long Span Structures category. Other awards it has received in 2019 include Architects' Journal's Architecture Awards for 'Best Leisure Project', the Building Magazine Project of the Year, Gold awards from the World Interior News (WIN) in the Branding and Wayfinding category as well as for its general concourse design in the Leisure and Entertainment Interiors category, Bronze Award in the Leisure category of the World Architecture News Awards, Local Authority Building Control (LABC) Building Excellence Award in the Best Inclusive Building category for Tottenham Experience, and British Constructional Steelwork Association's Structural Steel Design Award for Project of the Year. It was voted second by the public in the Stadium of the Year awards at StadiumDB.com in March 2020 after the Puskás Aréna in Hungary. It was also named the Venue of the Year for "the world's best stadium, arena or sports venue" in 2020 by TheStadiumBusiness, and won the stadium category at the mondo*dr Awards 2020. It was also awarded the Special prize Interior in the Sports category of Prix Versailles in 2020. In 2021, it was the winner of the RIBA National Award as well as the RIBA London Regional Award. It was named Best Venue by Mondo Stadia for the 2023 World Football Summit. In 2025, the stadium won the award for Best Football Club Stadium at the Football Business Awards.

== In popular media ==
The stadium is the subject of an episode of Richard Hammond's Big where the show's presenter Richard Hammond explores the biggest things he can find, broadcast in February 2020 on Discovery Channel. The stadium was the setting for an elimination challenge on the fourth episode of Top Chef: World All-Stars. The stadium was also the setting for an outside bet on You Bet! in 2024.

== Transport ==
The stadium is accessible via a number of London Overground, London Underground and National Rail stations: Seven Sisters, Tottenham Hale, Northumberland Park, and White Hart Lane stations. The nearest station, at around 200 m (660 ft) away, is White Hart Lane, which is on the London Overground line from Liverpool Street station. The station ticket hall was rebuilt in 2019, and a Wembley-style walkway for fans from the station to the stadium is planned. The next nearest is Northumberland Park and fans can reach the stadium via Park Lane. Both Seven Sisters and Tottenham Hale stations are stops along the Victoria line on London Underground. The walk to the stadium from Seven Sisters station takes around 30 minutes. White Hart Lane and Seven Sisters are popular stops for fans which can cause congestion after games on match days.

The stadium area is served by up to 144 buses an hour. Bus routes that stop close to the ground are 149, 259, 279 and W3. A number of bus routes however are subject to diversions on matchdays. The club also operates two high frequency shuttle bus services to the stadium, one from Alexandra Palace via Wood Green (on Piccadilly line) and finishing at Haringey Sixth Form College, and the other from Tottenham Hale to Duke's Aldridge Academy. On matchdays, roads near the stadium are normally closed to traffic two to three hours before kick-off, and one to one-and-a-half-hours after the match. Car parking in the area is controlled on matchdays. Tottenham has also started an arrangement with Big Green Coaches to provide matchday travel for fans to and from matches. A number of major towns in and around South East England are chosen as pickup points and supporters are dropped off at a designated coach parking facility near the Stadium, and are collected from the same area, with coaches departing around an hour after the final whistle back to their collection points.

== See also ==
- List of football stadiums in England
- List of stadiums in the United Kingdom by capacity
- Potential London NFL franchise
- Lists of stadiums
- New Highmark Stadium
