= Locws international =

Contemporary arts organisation based in Swansea, Wales

Locws International is a contemporary arts organisation, based in Swansea, South Wales, UK. They work with British and international artists to create visual responses to aspects of the city’s heritage, landscape and people, most notably through their Locws and Art Across the City events.

Artworks are often temporary and are generally site-specific sculptures, installations, performances or moving image based, cited in accessible public spaces, both indoors and out.

The organisation was originally set up in 1999 by Swansea-based artists David Hastie and Tim Davies. It is an artist-led charity and maintains an ongoing educational outreach project working in schools in the Swansea area.

== Permanent artworks ==
Ten artworks remain permanent fixtures including:

Artist	Title and material	Venue	Commissioned
Jeremy Deller	More Poetry Is Needed (billboard)	St Mary’s Car Park	2014
DJ Roberts	Michelangelo, Ping-Pong, Ambition, Sibelius, and Girls… (neon installation)	Kardomah Cafe, Park St	2014
Pete Fowler	Portrait Of The Artist As A Young… (mural)	58 High Street	2013
Sinta Tantra	Greater Reality Of Elsewhere (mural)	229 – 230 High Street	2013
Rik Bennett	Terpsichorean Trio (mural)	24 High Street	2012
Sean Puleston	We Are Here (mural, Installation)	226 High Street	2012
Mark Folds	Dylan’s Pencil (sculpture)	Cwmdonkin Park	2011
Bedwyr Williams	Lionheart & Lightsout (sculpture)	The Kingsway	2011
Bermingham and Robinson	The British Empire Panel Project (window panels)	The Brangwyn Hall	2009
Niamh McCann	Flock Of Ospreys Looking For The… (mural)	Dylan Thomas Theatre	2007

Bristow & Lloyd's Coming Soon mural (2011) was removed when the Bush Inn, High Street was demolished in 2013.

== Art Across the City 2015 ==
The artists commissioned for Art Across the City which ran from 21 March – 1 June 2015 were: Michael Stumpf, Graham Dolphin, Emily Speed, Colin Priest, David Cushway.

== Art Across the City 2014 ==
The artists commissioned for Art Across the City which ran from 12 April – 1 June 2014 were: Jon Burgerman, Jeremy Deller, Craig Fisher, Thomas Goddard, Nick Jordan, Jeremy Millar, Lisa Scantlebury, Ross Sinclair, Bob & Roberta Smith, Ultimate Holding Company and writers: Niall Griffiths, Rhian Edwards, Rachel Trezise

== Art Across the City 2013 ==
The artists commissioned for the Art Across the City 2013 Spring programme were: Pete Fowler, Olaf Breuning, Sinta Tantra, David Long, Philip Cheater. For the Autumn programme were: Jacob Dahlgren, Juneau Projects, Laura Sorvala, Mathew Houlding

== Art Across the City 2012 ==
The artists commissioned for the Art Across the City event which ran from 29 September – 11 November 2012 were: David Blandy, Jock Mooney, Fiona Curran, David Marchant, Joanne Tatham and Tom O’Sullivan, Sean Puleston, Rik Bennett

== Locws International projects 2011 ==
The artists commissioned for Locws International projects in 2011 were: Simon and Tom Bloor, Bristow & Lloyd, Holly Davie, Alex Duncan, Helen Edling, Mark Folds, Laura Ford, S Mark Gubb, Rhys Himsworth, Maider López, Bedwyr Williams.

== Locws International projects 2010 ==
The artists commissioned for Locws International projects in 2010 were: Tine Bech, Jackie Chettur, Rebecca Spooner, Simon Whitehead.

== Art Across the City and Locws International projects 2009 ==
The artists commissioned for the Art Across the City event which ran from 18 April to 10 May 2009 were: Tanya Axford, Megan Broadmeadow, Neville Gabie, Paul Granjon, Neeme Külm, Marko Mäetamm, Aisling O’Beirn, Calum Stirling. Artists commissioned for Locws International projects 2009 were: Bermingham and Robinson.

== Locws International projects 2008 ==
Artists commissioned for Locws International projects, 2008 were: Richard Higlett, Jennie Savage.

== Locws 3, Art Across the City 2007 ==
The artists commissioned for Locws 3 which ran from 14 April to 13 May 2007 were: Rhona Byrne, Milena Dopitova, Carwyn Evans, Rebecca Gould, Torsten Lauschmann, Niamh McCann, Sara Rees, Helen Sear, Jaan Toomik, Zoe Walker & Neil Bromwich.

== Locws 2 2002 ==
The artists commissioned for Locws 2 which ran from 7 to 29 September 2002 were: Davide Bertocchi, Enrica Borghi, Angharad Pearce Jones, Brigitte Jurack, Annie Lovejoy, Alice Maher, Paul & Paula, Anthony Shapland, Catriona Stanton, Grace Weir, Daphne Wright.

== Locws 1 2000 ==
The artists commissioned for Locws 1 which ran from 2 September to 1 October 2000 were: Eric Angels, Iwan Bala, Maud Cotter, Dorothy Cross, Tim Davies, Peter Finnemore, Rose Frain, Hughes Germain, David Hastie, Karen Ingham, Philip Napier, Tina O’Connoll, Benoit Sire, Lois Williams, Craig Wood.
