= Gray Wielebinski =

American visual artist

Gray Wielebinski (b. 1991 Dallas, TX) is a multidisciplinary visual artist. His practice includes video, performance, collage, installation, sculpture and explores themes of mythology, identity, gender, nationhood, and memory.

== Early life and education ==
Wielebinski attended the L’école Nationale Supérieure des Arts Appliqués et des Métiers d’Art (ENSAAMA Olivier de Serres) in 2012. He graduated from Pomona College with a BA in Studio Art in 2014. In 2018, he graduated with an MFA from Slade School of Fine Art, UCL, London, UK.

== Work ==
In 2020, Wielebinski was listed as a recipient of The Artsy Vanguard 2020. Later that year he had two solo shows, one at Gallery 12.26 in Dallas and a solo show in London at Hales Gallery.

He showed a Mechanical Bull work, titled Pain and Glory, at Bold Tendencies at Peckham Levels from in 2022.

In 2023, Wielebinski had a solo exhibition, The Red Sun is High, the Blue Low, at the ICA London. The title of the exhibition is a reference to an essay ("About 5,750 Words") by science fiction writer Samuel R. Delany.

In 2024, Wielebinski had a solo booth at Frieze London, in which he displayed wooden sculptures based on gun grips.

== Collections ==
- Los Angeles County Museum of Art (LACMA), Los Angeles, CA
- Benton Museum of Art, Claremont, CA

== Publications ==
- Gray Wielebinski: The Red Sun is High, the Blue Low (ICA London), 2023
- One Hundred Baseball Cards (Baron Books), 2022
