= Tottenham University Technical College =

Coordinates: 51°36′20″N 0°4′0″W

- London

Information
- Department for Education URN: 140968 Tables

Tottenham University Technical College, in Haringey, London, was a secondary educational institution focusing on education in the sciences, health and sports. It opened in September 2014 and closed in July 2017.

The school was part of the Northumberland Development Project with Middlesex University as a partner, and part of the University Technical College program operated by the Baker Dearing Educational Trust. It was housed in a new building, above a new Sainsbury's supermarket, to the north of the former stadium White Hart Lane.

The UTC closed at the end of the 2016–17 academic year, owing to low pupil numbers; in January 2017 there were 38 enrolled. The site became the home of the London Academy of Excellence Tottenham, a sixth-form college.
