= London Academy of Excellence Tottenham =

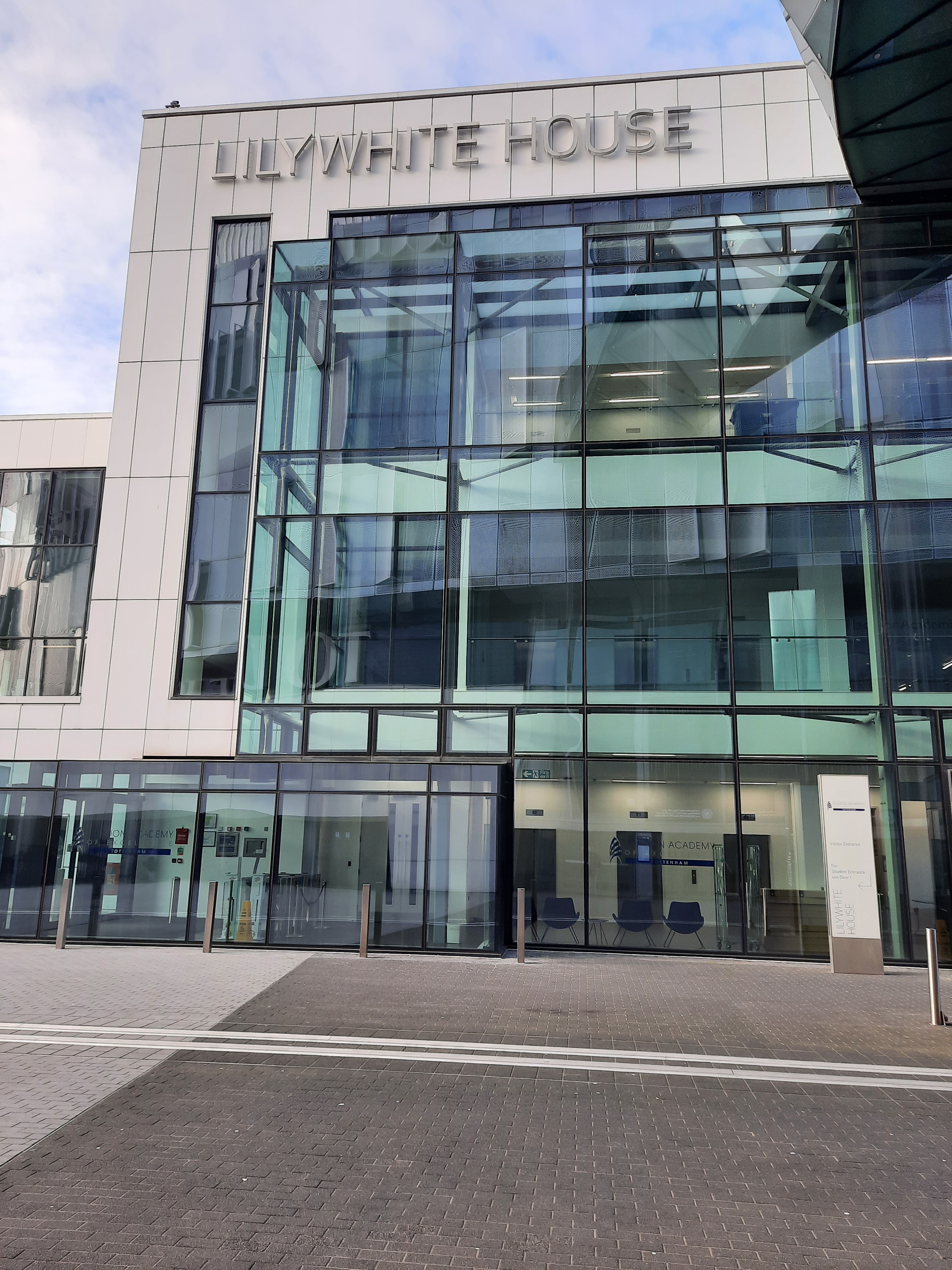
- Lilywhite House, where LAE Tottenham is located. Note the LAE branding on the ground floor.

Location
- 780 High Road; London, N17 0BX; England; 51.6044°N 0.0674°W

Information
- Type: Free school
- Motto: The Place for Academic Rigour
- Established: 2017; 9 years ago
- Local authority: Haringey
- Department for Education URN: 144753 Tables
- Ofsted: Reports
- Head: Jan Balon
- Gender: Co-educational
- Age: 16 to 19
- Website: www.laetottenham.ac.uk

The London Academy of Excellence Tottenham is an academically selective free school for pupils aged 16–19. The sixth-form academy was opened in September 2017 in the London borough of Haringey.

The academy's principal educational sponsor is The Highgate School, an independent school in North London. Eight other independent schools in London and The South East will act as partner schools, and Tottenham Hotspur Football Club is the business sponsor.

== Background ==
The sixth-form free school offers the fifteen A-level subjects most valued by prestigious universities and employers. It is based on the successful model of the London Academy of Excellence in the London borough of Newham, which was voted the "Best State Sixth Form in the Country" in 2015 and saw half of all A-level grades at A/A* in their 2016 A-level results. The sixth form was named by Tatler in its list of the "Best Secondary Schools 2017", praising its "super" academic facilities and "eagle-eyed" tutoring system. As of January 2017, 20 students held offers to study at Oxford or Cambridge.

The sixth form has substantial links with the local community, with all students volunteering in partnership teaching activities involving local schools based at the sixth form. 50% of offers are guaranteed to be made to students studying in five schools in the east of Haringey: Duke's Aldridge Academy, Gladesmore Community School, Heartlands High School, Park View School, and Woodside High School. In December 2016, it was recommended by the Haringey STEM Commission that the London Academy of Excellence Tottenham should be a centre for STEM teaching excellence, acting as a hub "for improvement, support and professional development" throughout the borough.

== Educational sponsor ==
The principal educational sponsor is Highgate School, a leading independent school in North London. As part of its charitable activity, the school has funded the Chrysalis Partnership, a scheme supporting 26 state schools in six London boroughs, some of which act as feeder schools for the new sixth form. Highgate School has been a founding partner of the London Academy of Excellence in Stratford since 2010.

As the principal educational sponsor, Highgate School recruited and deployed the full-time equivalent of five members of the total teaching staff, as well as assisting with wider administrative, pastoral, and management support.

Eight leading independent schools - Alleyn's School, Chigwell School, Haberdashers' Aske's Boys' School, Harrow School, John Lyon School, Mill Hill School, North London Collegiate School, and St Dunstan's College - share their expertise and teaching staff.

== Business sponsor ==
The business sponsor is Tottenham Hotspur Football Club, which provides financial support and manages the school's premises and facilities. The sixth form is in Lilywhite House, which the football club owns and operates. The school complements the ongoing Northumberland Development Project to build a football stadium which will replace White Hart Lane.
