= White Hart Lane =

Former football stadium of Tottenham Hotspur

- "The Lane"
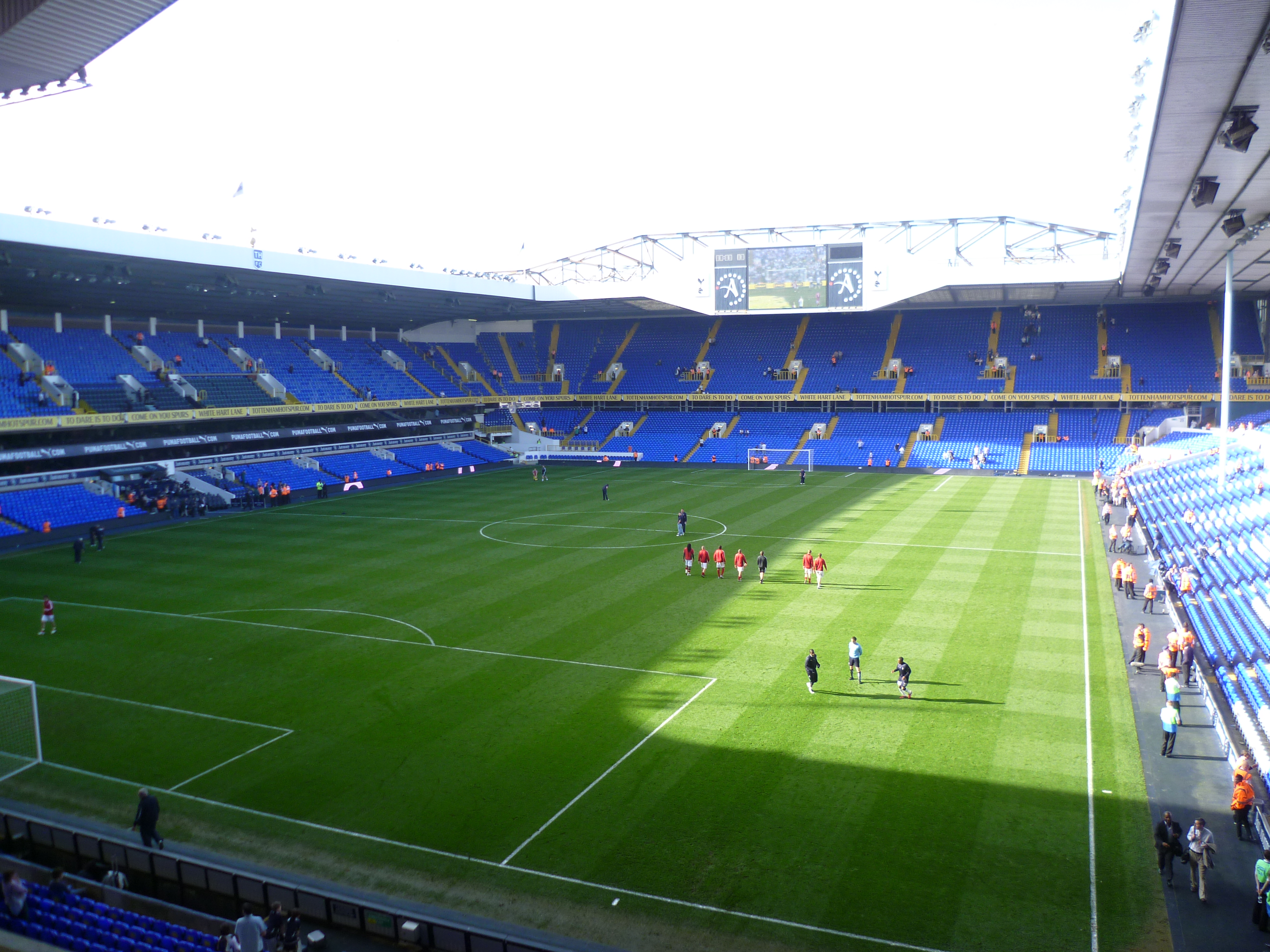
- White Hart Lane in 2011
- Interactive map of White Hart Lane
- Full name: White Hart Lane Stadium
- Location: Tottenham; London, N17; England
- Coordinates: 51°36′12″N 0°03′57″W
- Owner: Tottenham Hotspur
- Operator: Tottenham Hotspur (Handed over to Mace on 15 May 2017 for demolition)
- Capacity: 36,284
- Surface: Desso GrassMaster
- Field size: 100 × 67 m (110 × 73 yd)
- Public transit: White Hart Lane

Construction
- Built: Between October and December 1898
- Opened: 4 September 1899; 127 years ago
- Closed: 14 May 2017; 9 years ago
- Demolished: Between June and August 2017
- Cost: £100,050 (1934)
- Architect: Archibald Leitch (1909)

Tenants
- Tottenham Hotspur (1899–2017); London Monarchs (1995–1996)

White Hart Lane was a football stadium in Tottenham, North London and the home of Tottenham Hotspur from 1899 to 2017. Its capacity varied over the years; when changed to all-seater it had a capacity of 36,284. The stadium was fully demolished after the end of the 2016–17 season.

The stadium hosted 2,533 competitive Spurs games in its 118-year history. It was also used for England national football matches and England under-21 football matches. White Hart Lane once had a capacity of nearly 80,000 with attendances in the early 1950s that reached the 70,000s, but as seating was introduced, the stadium's capacity decreased to a modest number in comparison to other Premier League clubs. The record attendance at the ground was 75,038, for an FA Cup tie on 5 March 1938 against Sunderland. Tottenham's final game at White Hart Lane was played on 14 May 2017 with a 2–1 victory against Manchester United.

Tottenham's new home, Tottenham Hotspur Stadium, has a capacity of 62,850 and was designed by Populous. It was built in almost the same location as White Hart Lane, instead of moving elsewhere within or away from the borough of Haringey. While the replacement stadium was under construction, all Tottenham home games in the 2017–18 season as well as all but five in 2018–19 were played at Wembley. After two successful test events, Tottenham Hotspur officially moved into the new ground on 3 April 2019.

== History ==
=== Origin ===
When the club was first formed in 1882, the club played its matches on public land at the Park Lane end of Tottenham Marshes. As the ground was on public land, the club could not charge admission fees for spectators, and while the number of spectators grew to a few thousand within a few years, it yielded no gate receipts. In 1888, the club rented a pitch between numbers 69 and 75 Northumberland Park at a cost of £17 per annum, with the spectators charged 3d a game. The first stand with just over 100 seats and changing rooms underneath was built on the ground for the 1894–95 season. Overcrowding at the ground however became an issue; in 1898, during a match against Woolwich Arsenal attended by a record crowd of 15,000, the refreshment stand collapsed when fans climbed up onto its roof, prompting the club to start looking for a new ground. In 1899, the club moved a short distance to a piece of land behind the White Hart pub.

The new location was to the east of Tottenham High Road. The site was formerly used as a nursery owned by the brewery company Charringtons. The ground was leased from Charringtons with the proviso that Spurs must guarantee crowds of 1,000 for first-team matches and 500 for the reserves, easily achievable when the average attendance of Tottenham's matches was 4,000. A groundsman at a local cricket club, John Over, was tasked with demolishing the greenhouses and preparing a playing surface for football. The stands from the previous ground at Northumberland Park were moved to the new ground. The new ground was never officially named, although names such as Gilpin Park and Percy Park were suggested. In its early days it was normally referred to as the Hotspur's or Spurs' Ground by the club or the High Road Ground by the public, in time it became popularly known as White Hart Lane, which is in fact the name of the street on the western side of High Road, away from the ground. It is however unclear how it became so-named; some thought that it acquired the name because spectators would first meet up at the White Hart Lane railway station; another suggestion is that it referred to the lane leading to the stadium entrance beside the White Hart pub, later officially named Bill Nicholson Way.

First match at White Hart Lane, Spurs vs Notts County, 4 September 1899

The first game at the Lane to mark its opening was a friendly against Notts County on 4 September 1899, with around 5,000 supporters attending, generating a gate receipt of £115. The first goal at the Lane came from Tommy McCairns of Notts County, followed by an equaliser from Tom Pratt and a hat-trick from David Copeland, ending in a 4–1 home win. The first competitive game on the ground was held five days later in front of an 11,000 crowd against Queens Park Rangers, which Spurs won 1–0 with the only goal scored by Tom Smith.

By 1904, the ground had an overall capacity of 32,000, with a main stand that provided seating for 500, and covered accommodation for 12,000. In February 1904, overcrowding during an FA Cup match against Aston Villa led to the abandonment of the match and a pitch invasion by fans, resulting in the club being fined and ordered to erect a steel fence around the pitch. The ground needed to be expanded; although a large earth bank was built at the Park Lane end in 1904, the club's ability to develop the White Hart Lane site was restricted by the terms of the ground lease with Charringtons. Following a share issue, the club bought the freehold for £8,900 in 1905. An additional £2,600 was used to purchase the land at the northern (Paxton Road) end, where another large bank was built the same year to match the one at the Park Lane end, bringing the capacity up to 40,000. Spurs were admitted to the Second Division of the Football League in 1908, and they played their first league game on 1 September 1908 against Wolverhampton Wanderers at White Hart Lane. Spurs won 3–0, and the first Football League goal at the ground was scored by Vivian Woodward.

=== Redevelopment ===
The West Stand built in 1909

White Hart Lane was redeveloped in the early 20th century, and its stands were rebuilt over a period of two and a half decades based on designs by the stadium architect Archibald Leitch. The first to be designed, the main West Stand, was a two-tiered structure with seating for 5,300 in the upper tier and a paddock in front with standing room for over 6,000. The roof covered the whole stand and featured a mock-Tudor gable, emblazoned with the club's name. At the time of its construction, it was the largest stand at a British football ground. Built at a cost of £50,000, the West Stand opened on 11 September 1909 for Spurs' first home game in Division One, which was a match against Manchester United that ended in a 2–2 draw. The central section of the East Stand was also covered in 1909; two years later its wooden terrace was replaced by an enlarged concrete terrace, with the roof extended to cover the whole stand. With further expansion of the banking at the two ends, the stadium capacity increased to over 50,000 by the onset of the First World War. During the war, the stadium was taken over by the Ministry of War and the East Stand was turned into a factory for making gas masks, gunnery and protection equipment.

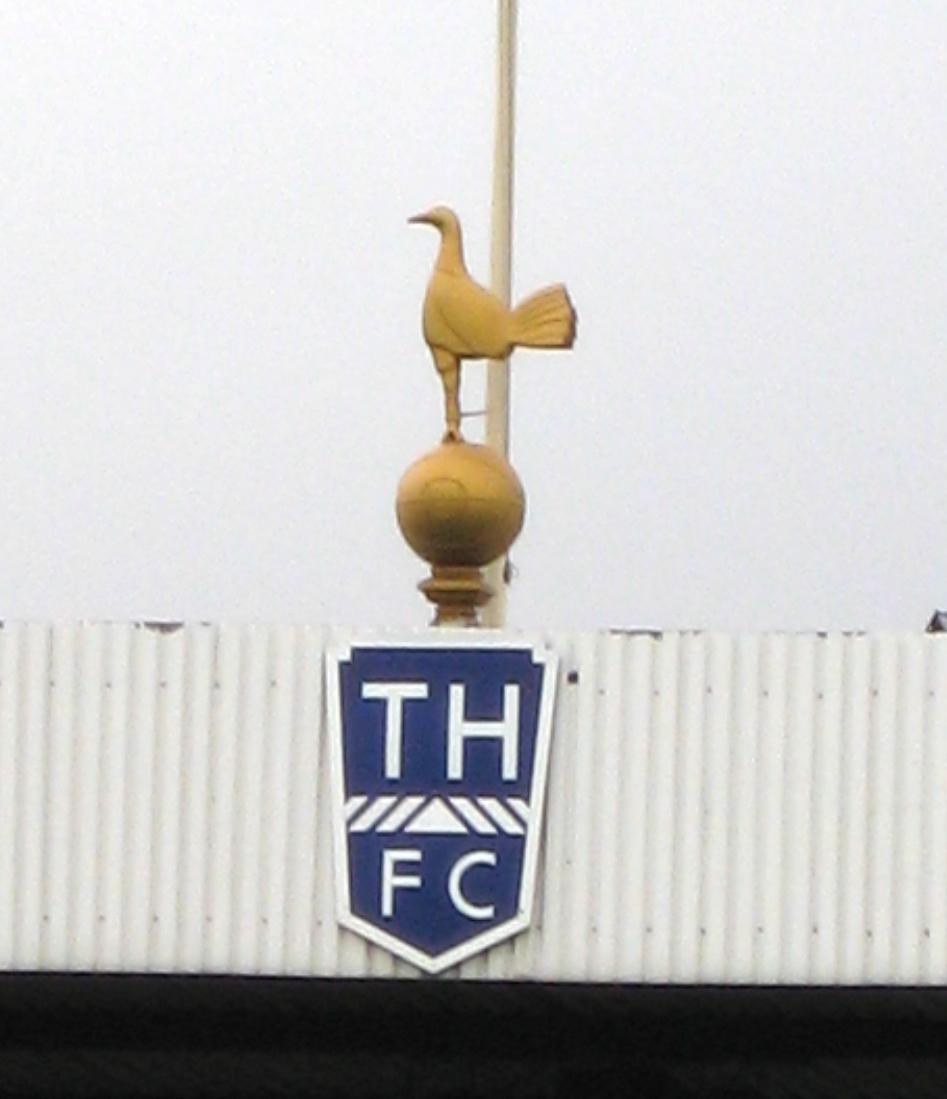
The Spurs cockerel

The pitch was overlooked by a bronze fighting cock (the club symbol) that kept an eye on proceedings from the roof of the touchline stands. The cockerel was adopted as an emblem for the club as Harry Hotspur, after whom the club was named, wore spurs to make his horse go faster as he charged in battles, and spurs are also associated with fighting cocks. The original cockerel on a ball was erected in 1909 and was cast by William James Scott, who had played for the club when it was an amateur club. It was originally located atop the West Stand but was removed in 1957 for the upgrading of floodlighting and reappeared on top of the East Stand in December 1958. In 1989, the original cockerel was removed to be replaced by fibreglass replicas that were placed on top of both the East Stand and West Stand. The original cockerel was moved to the executive suites, where it stayed for many years, then to the West Stand reception. It was moved to the club offices at Lilywhite House in 2016 as the stadium was due to be demolished for redevelopment.

The ground continued to be renovated in the 1920s and early 1930s, with three more stands designed by Archibald Leitch. The FA Cup win in 1921 provided money to build a covered, two-tiered terrace at the Paxton Road end and, in 1923, a similar stand was added at the Park Lane end. The capacity had now reached 58,000, with about 40,000 under cover. In 1934 the club spent £60,000 to rebuild the East Stand. The new stand was a double-decker structure, with the lower section in two tiers; the upper section had 4,983 seats, while the two lower tiers provided standing room for over 18,700. The middle section, which is the top tier of the lower section, was known to fans as "The Shelf". The Shelf became a place where ardent fans congregated, unlike many other stadiums where the stands behind the goals are the preferred gathering place for the loudest fans. It was also the only raised terracing in the English league. The total stadium capacity was now nearly 80,000. The East Stand was officially opened on 22 September 1934 for a match against Aston Villa.

In the 1930s, football had a popular following, and despite Tottenham's relative lack of success at the time, 75,038 spectators squeezed into White Hart Lane in March 1938 to see Spurs' performance against Sunderland in the FA Cup. The redeveloped stadium was also used for international matches; in 1935 it hosted a game between Nazi Germany and England that England won, 3–0. The venue also hosted some of the football preliminaries for the 1948 Summer Olympics. During the Second World War, Spurs shared the ground with rival Arsenal when Highbury was requisitioned by the government and used as an Air Raid Precautions centre.

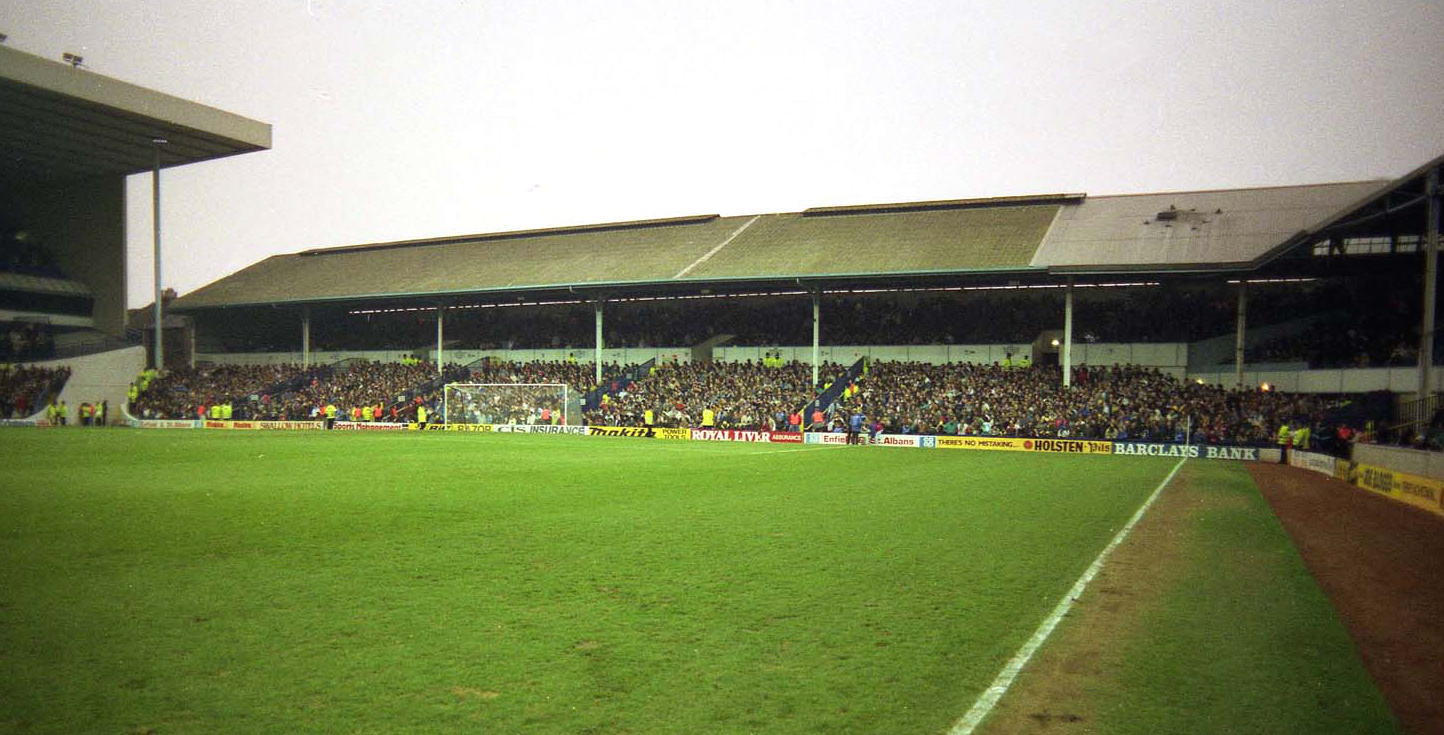
The old South Stand before it was rebuilt in the 1990s

Tottenham became firmly established as one of England's biggest clubs that attracted some of the highest attendances in the country on a regular basis. Attendance at White Hart Lane averaged at over 53,000 in 1961, their double winning year. Between the late 1920s and 1972, White Hart Lane was one of very few British football grounds that featured no advertising hoardings at all.

1953 saw the introduction of floodlights, with their first use being a friendly against Racing Club de Paris in September that year. They were upgraded in 1957, and in 1961, floodlight pylons were installed. These were renovated again in the 1970s, and in 1990 the floodlight pylons were replaced with spotlights mounted on the East and West stands.

=== All-seater stadium ===
The stadium as designed by Archibald Leitch stayed in the same form for a few decades, seating sections however were progressively introduced. In 1962, 2,600 seats were fitted at the back of the South Stand (on Park Lane), followed the next year by 3,500 seats at the North (Paxton Road) Stand, which was further extended in 1968 to link up with the West Stand to give a further 1,400 seats. The South and West stands were linked in 1973, adding further seats, but the capacity of the ground dropped overall as seats replaced standing terraces.

In 1980, in a bid to improve facilities and upgrade what was then considered an outdated stadium, a new phase of redevelopment began that transformed the ground. The new chairman, Arthur Richardson, green-lit the project over the scepticism of previous chairman Sidney Wale. The old West Stand was demolished in November 1980 to be replaced by a new stand designed by Ernest Atherden that had 6,500 seats and featured 72 executive boxes. The new West Stand opened 15 months later on 6 February 1982 for a match against Wolverhampton Wanderers, won by Spurs 6–1, with a hat-trick from Ricky Villa. However, cost overruns in the project, which rose from £3.5 million to £6 million, and the cost of rebuilding the team, resulted in financial difficulties for the club. Irving Scholar took advantage of a rift in the boardroom and bought out the shares of Wale, leading to a change of directors.

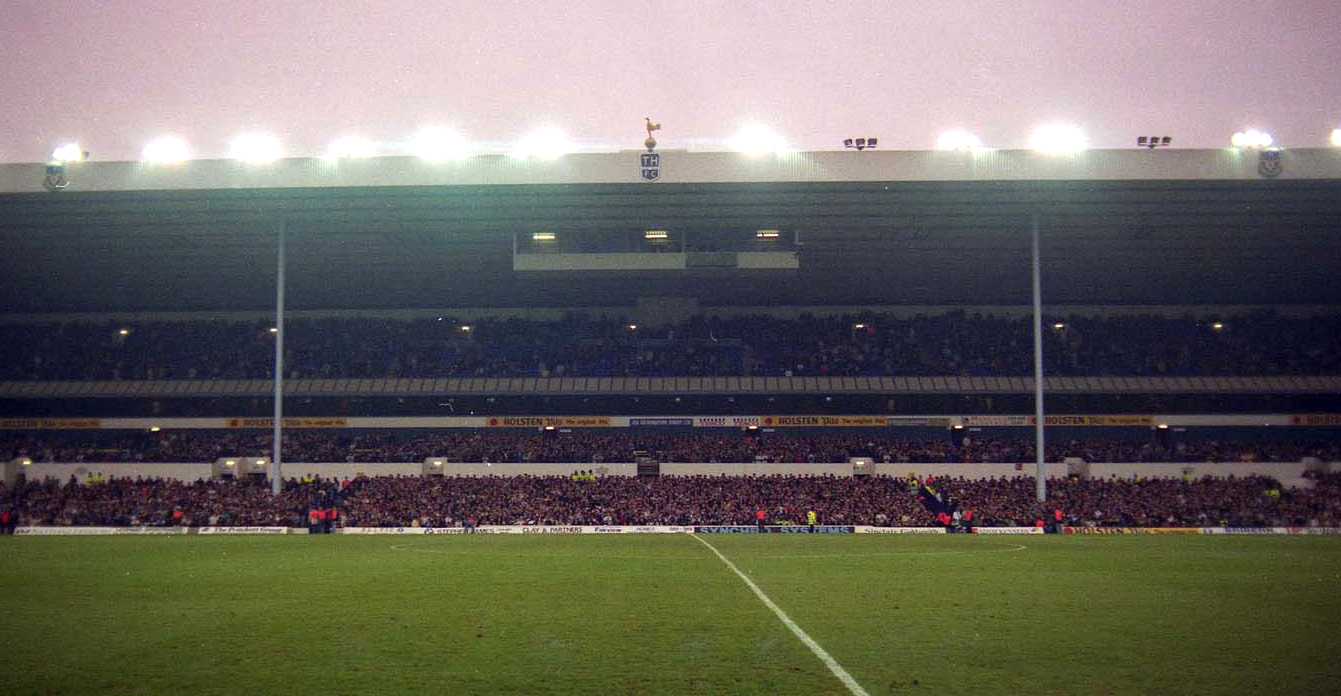
The East Stand in 1991 – the upper part of The Shelf had been replaced by executive boxes, but the remaining standing terraces had not yet been replaced by seats

In 1985, a plan to demolish and rebuild the East Stand was rejected by Haringey Council. In 1988, the club decided to proceed instead with a refurbishment of the East Stand despite objections by fans. The long stretch of raised standing terrace on the East Stand, known by fans as The Shelf, was redesigned to include the installation of executive boxes replacing the upper section of the standing terrace. Work on the East Stand however caused the opening game of the 1988–89 season against Coventry to be postponed a few hours before kickoff. The East Stand was closed that season. Work on the stadium continued in the summer of 1989 and the refurbished East Stand opened on 18 October 1989 for the North London Derby. The cost of the project however, doubled to over £8 million; this, together with other financial problems, would again lead to a change of directors at the club in 1991.

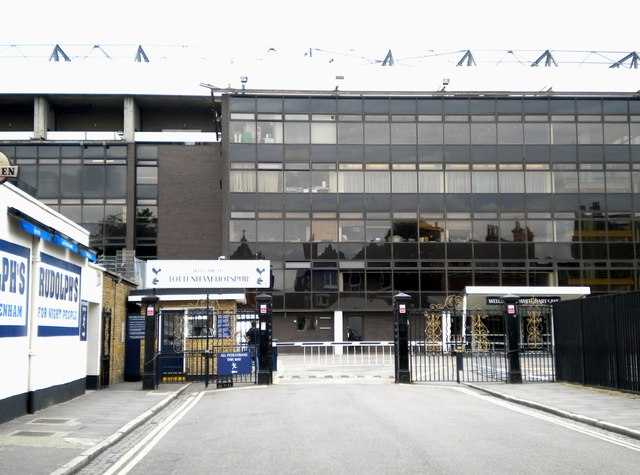
Front entrance of White Hart Lane

There was perimeter fencing in the 1980s between the stands behind the goals and the pitch; high fencing in British football stadiums was erected to segregate away fans and to combat the threat of pitch invasions from hooligans in the 1970s. Fencing began to be removed in the later part of the 1980s, and all the fences were removed on 18 April 1989 for safety reasons in reaction to the Hillsborough disaster three days earlier, in which 97 Liverpool fans were fatally injured, most of them crushed to death against the perimeter fencing in an overcrowded standing area. The fencing at the same place had also previously caused an incidence of crushing of Spurs fans during a cup tie in 1981.

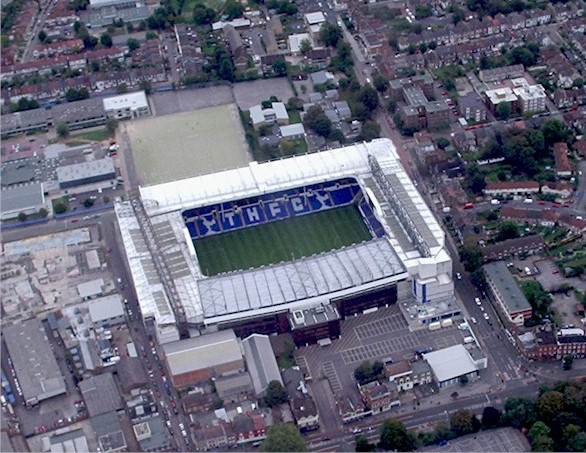
Aerial view looking east over the stadium

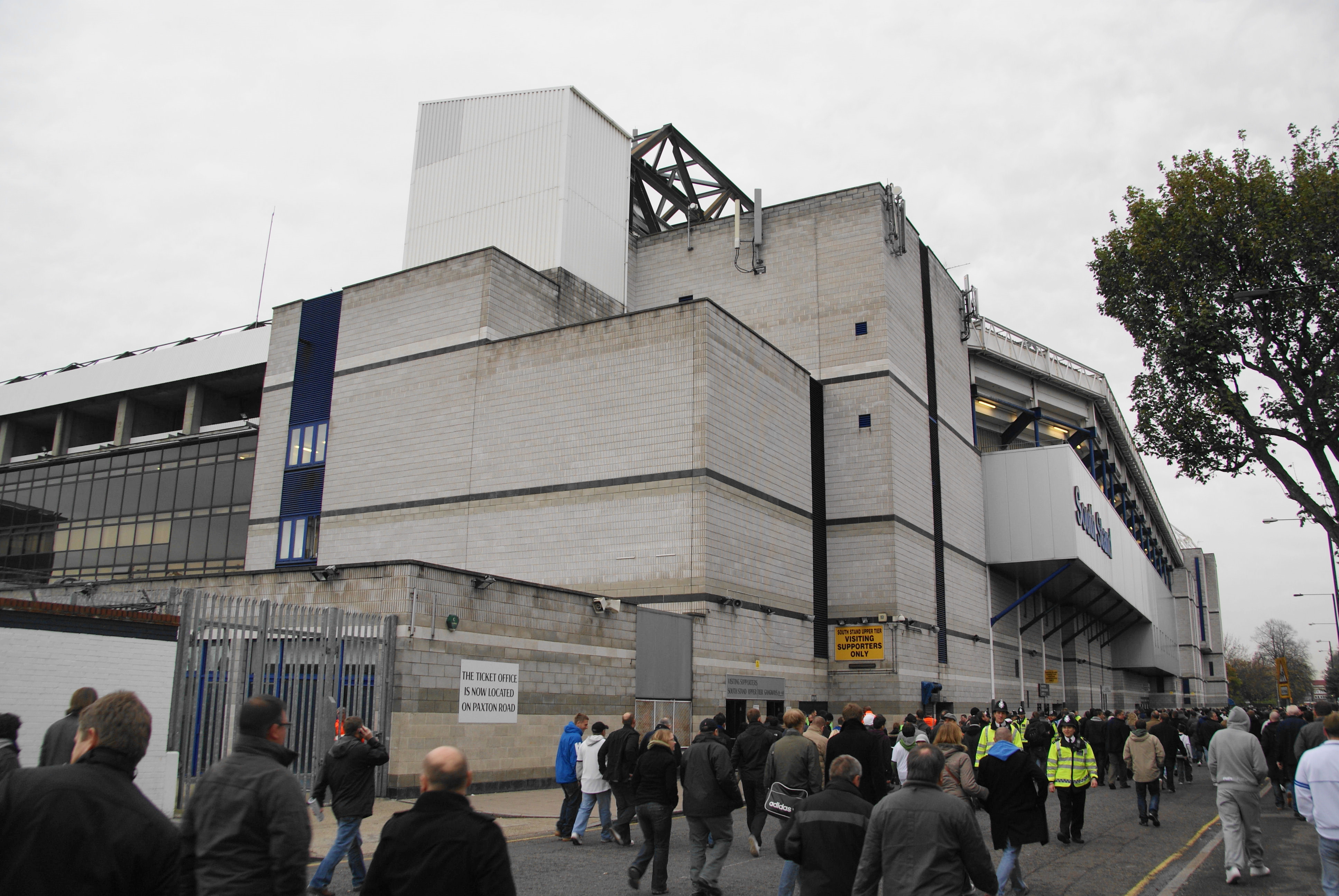
Outside View of stadium from south-west corner

Also as a response to the Hillsborough disaster, and the subsequent Taylor Report of 1990 that called for all-seater stadiums, standing areas were removed over the next few years, further reducing the capacity of the ground. Standing areas on the lower terraces of the East and South stands were replaced with seating in 1992, followed by the North Stand the next year. The South Stand was demolished in 1994, and its redevelopment completed in March 1995. The work was partly funded by the Football Trust. The first Jumbotron video screen for live coverage and screening of away matches was also installed above the South Stand, and there would eventually be two screens, one above each penalty area. The renovation, and the addition of a second tier to the Members' (North) Stand on Paxton Road, was completed in 1998, leaving the stadium with a capacity of 36,240. The stadium would stay in this form, bar some minor adjustments, until 2016, when the north-east corner of the stadium was demolished to allow for the construction of a new stadium, while the final 2016–17 season was being played at White Hart Lane.

=== Redevelopment and demolition ===
By the turn of the millennium, the capacity of White Hart Lane had fallen significantly behind compared to other major Premier League clubs and they had plans to expand further (for example, proposed development of Old Trafford had a projected capacity of 79,000, while Arsenal planned to build a new stadium that would seat 60,000). Talks began over the redevelopment and future of White Hart Lane, and many stadium designs and ideas were mooted, including the possibility of Tottenham Hotspur moving home. However, a move to Wembley was ruled out by the club, as was talk of moving to the Olympic Stadium in Stratford after completion of the 2012 Olympic Games. Ultimately the club's owners, ENIC Group, decided to focus solely on the ongoing redevelopment plan for White Hart Lane as part of the Northumberland Development Project.

Sections of the North and East Stands at the north-east corner were removed in 2016 to allow construction of the new stadium next to the old stadium in the final season at the Lane. As this reduced the stadium capacity below that required for European games, Tottenham Hotspur played every European home game of the 2016–17 competition at Wembley. On 14 May 2017, White Hart Lane hosted its final match in a Premier League encounter between Tottenham Hotspur and Manchester United. It ended in a 2–1 victory for the home side, securing the highest league ranking for Spurs since 1963, with goals from Victor Wanyama and Harry Kane. The last goal at the stadium was scored by Manchester United striker Wayne Rooney. Demolition work on the stadium began the following day and was completed by August 2017.

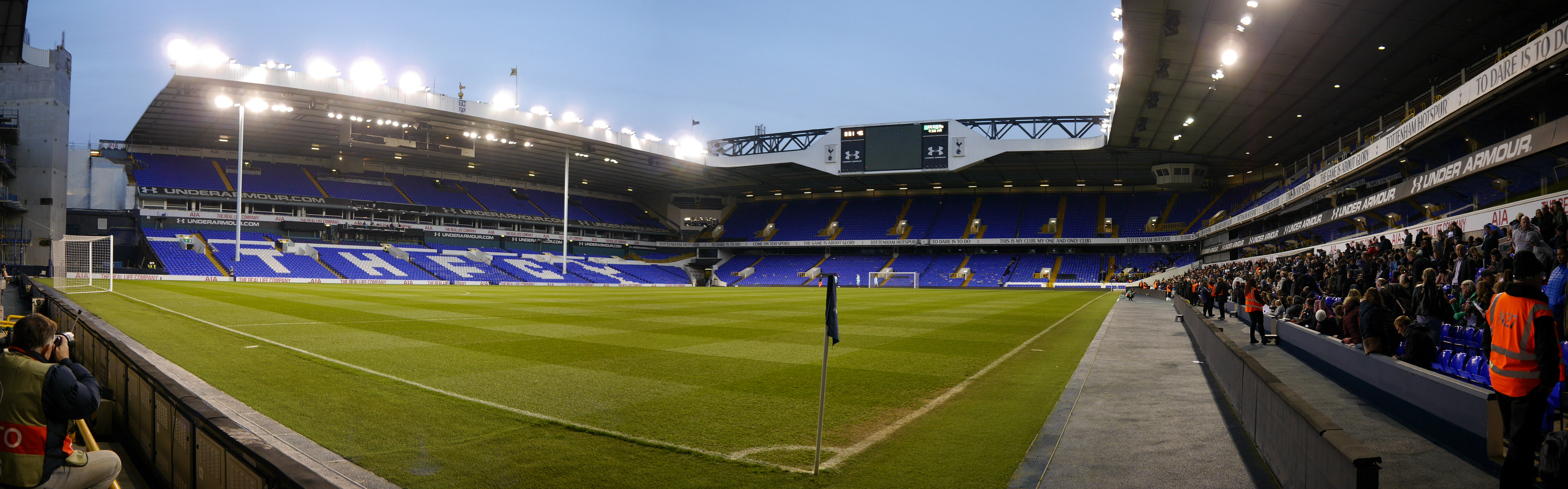
A panorama of White Hart Lane from the North-West corner. The North-East corner (left) was removed for the duration of the 2016–17 Football season for the construction of the new stadium

== Other uses ==
The stadium hosted many international football matches. One notable match took place in 1935 when England played Nazi Germany, which led to protests by Jewish groups. The match ended in a 3–0 win for England. During the construction of the new Wembley Stadium, White Hart Lane hosted full England international matches, such as a 2–0 defeat to Holland. Following the opening of the rebuilt Wembley, the Lane was occasionally used to host England Under-21s international matches, most notably a 1–1 draw against France Under-21s.

The ground was used for other sports and events since the early years such as baseball (there was once a Spurs baseball team). It was used for many boxing matches over many years, the earliest matches being held in 1922. There were a number of notable boxing matches at the stadium; for example, the match between Jack London vs Bruce Woodcock in 1945, the Frank Bruno vs Joe Bugner bout in 1987, and the fight on 21 September 1991 where Michael Watson collapsed with a near fatal brain injury after a bout with Chris Eubank.

In 1995 and 1996, White Hart Lane also hosted American football, as the home ground of the London Monarchs. Because the pitch could not accommodate a regulation-length American football field, the Monarchs received special permission from the World League to play on a 93-yard field. The new Tottenham Hotspur Stadium continued this association with American football, as an artificial turf field is located beneath its retractable grass pitch, to be used for the American gridiron code of football.

== Structure and facilities ==
Audio description by David Lammy

White Hart Lane plan

The outer White Hart Lane frame was designed in a rectangular shape, with the inner seating tiers being rounded to maximise the number of seats possible within the structure. The cockerel was placed upon the West Stand, with the West Stand located on Tottenham High Road, the East Stand being on Worcester Avenue, the North Stand on Paxton Road and the South Stand on Park Lane. The stands were officially named after compass points, but were more colloquially referred to by the road onto which they back.

The capacity of the stands before the demolition of part of White Hart Lane, in summer 2016, was as follows:

Stand	Capacity
North Stand – (Paxton Road)	10,086
South Stand – (Park Lane)	8,633
East Stand – (Worcester Avenue)	10,691
West Stand – (High Road)	6,890
Total capacity	36,300

The pitch at White Hart Lane, at 100 × 67 metres (or 6,700 square meters), was one of the smallest in the Premier League.

== Records ==
Tottenham's biggest ever win came at the stadium in an FA Cup tie against Crewe in February 1960, with a 13–2 final score. This was also the highest score seen at the stadium. The biggest win in the Football League at the stadium took place on 22 October 1977 against Bristol Rovers, which finished 9–0. On 22 November 2009, Tottenham defeated Wigan Athletic 9–1 in the Premier League. The club's biggest defeats at the venue were 0–6 scores in Division One, firstly against Sunderland on 19 December 1914 and later against Arsenal on 6 March 1935.

The player with the most appearances at White Hart Lane is Steve Perryman who played 436 games, while Jimmy Greaves scored the most goals, with 176 goals at The Lane. The highest attendance recorded at The Lane was 75,038 for the Sixth Round FA Cup tie against Sunderland, 5 March 1938. It was also the highest ever gate for a home match at the club until 2016 when over 85,000 attended the 2016–17 UEFA Champions League match against Monaco, held at Wembley Stadium, which was their temporary home for European matches that season.

== Transport ==
The area close to the stadium is regularly served by many different bus routes and services. Bus routes 149, 259, 279, and 349 stop outside the ground. White Hart Lane and Northumberland Park National Rail stations are 0.2 miles (0.32 km) and 0.7 miles (1.1 km) away, respectively. Tottenham Hale, a rail and tube station, and Seven Sisters tube station are also nearby. There are controlled parking zones in operation in the area on all match days.

== Demolition and replacement ==
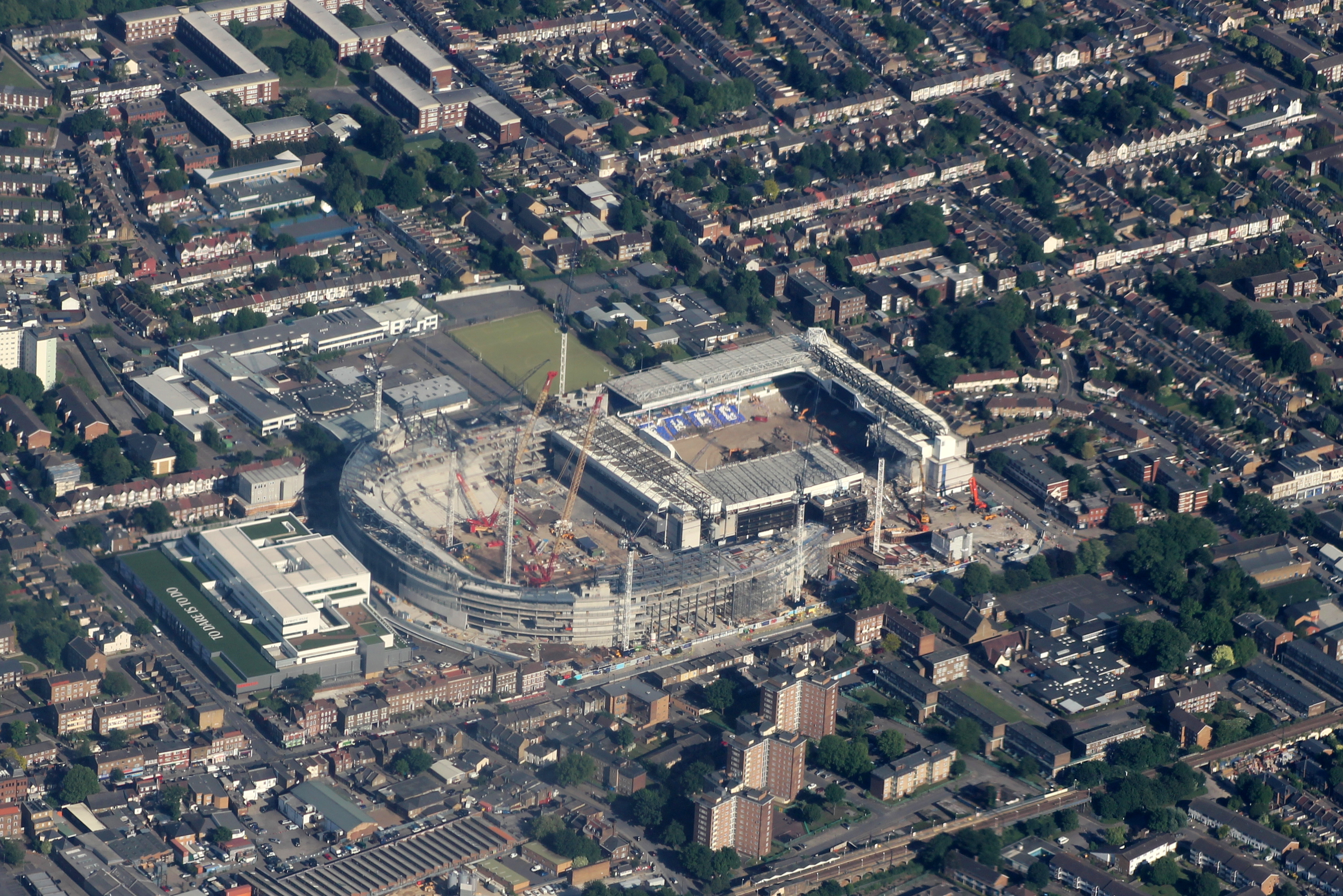
White Hart Lane in May 2017 with new stadium being built next to it. West Stand partially demolished.

The first plan for relocation, reported in 2001, was to relocate to a proposed 43,000-seat stadium at Pickett's Lock, intended for the 2005 World Athletics Championships to be held in London. However, the stadium was never built as the government deemed the project too expensive, and the games eventually took place in Helsinki.

Over the next few years various other schemes were suggested, including a relocation to the rebuilt Wembley Stadium (which finally opened in 2007). On 1 October 2010, ostensibly as a back-up to the plans for a new stadium, Tottenham registered interest in making use of the Olympic Stadium, being built for the 2012 London Olympics, in conjunction with AEG, owners and operators of The O_{2} in London's Greenwich, formerly known as the Millennium Dome. The club also proposed rebuilding on the site after the 2012 Olympics. However, Spurs bid for the stadium was rejected on 11 February 2011. Spurs pursued legal action over the ruling to give the Stratford stadium to West Ham United, but later withdrew.

The club also pursued another option, namely the Northumberland Development Project (NDP). This involved a plan to build a new stadium, partly on the site of the existing White Hart Lane ground, and include leisure facilities, shops, housing, a club museum, a public space and also a new base for the Tottenham Hotspur Foundation. The NDP was announced on 30 October 2008 to develop the current site and land to its north, to construct a totally new 56,250-seat stadium. On 26 October 2009, the club submitted their planning application, hoping to start work on the new ground in 2010, and to be playing in it come 2012. But in May 2010, following adverse reaction, this was withdrawn in favour of a substantially revised planning application. Haringey Council were requested on 30 September 2010 to grant permission for the new stadium and other associated developments (subject to negotiation of 'Section 106' developer contributions). The new plans were referred to English Heritage, the Mayor of London and the Secretary of State for a final decision. The Mayor of London, Boris Johnson, approved the plans on 25 November 2010. On 20 September 2011, planning permission was granted (planning reference HGY/2010/1000).

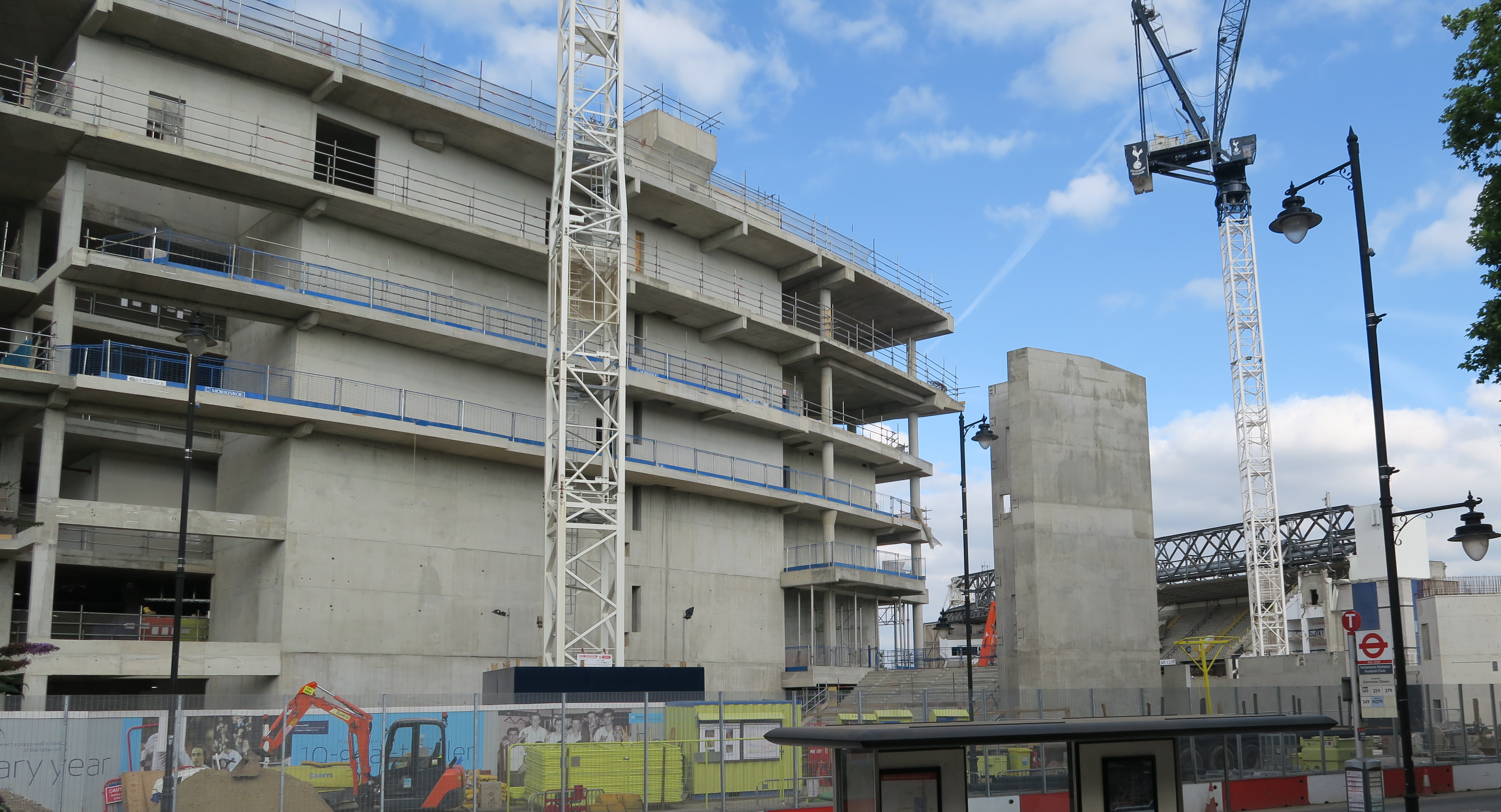
White Hart Lane in July 2017. Only the South Stand still standing here (visible behind new stadium under construction), but soon to be completely removed.

The development plans were revised several times during a lengthy delay because of a compulsory purchase order (CPO). This CPO was eventually issued in July 2014, giving approval for the new stadium scheme to proceed, but was subject to an unsuccessful legal challenge by a business located within the proposed site in February 2015. On 8 July 2015, Tottenham announced brand new revised plans, including a larger 61,000 capacity, making it the biggest club stadium in London. The revised stadium design also included a 17,000 seat single tier stand, the biggest of its kind in the UK. The new plan also included a combination of 585 new homes, a 180-room hotel, an extreme sports building, a community health centre, enhanced public spaces and 'The Tottenham Experience' – an interactive museum and club shop complex incorporating the listed Warmington House. Additionally, on 8 July 2015 it was announced by the club that the new stadium would host two NFL International Series games, every year, for ten years.

On 16 December 2015, the revised plans were approved by Haringey Council (planning reference HGY/2015/3000) that would enable Phase 2 of the NDP to begin, as Phase 1 (Lilywhite House) had already been completed in February 2015. This therefore allowed widening of the High Road pavement leading to the new stadium by demolishing three buildings (Edmonton Dispensary, The Red House, and the former White Hart Public House). Construction work on the stadium began in early 2016.

On 28 April 2017, it was announced that Tottenham would play all its home matches in the 2017–18 season at Wembley, in order to complete the demolition of White Hart Lane and the construction of the new stadium. The new stadium was scheduled to open for the start of the 2018/19 season, but the opening was delayed until 2019. The White Hart Lane name would be abandoned in favour of a naming rights sponsorship link.
