= Northumberland Development Project =

Mixed-use development in London, England

- Artist's impression of the Northumberland Development Project
- Interactive map of the Northumberland Development Project area

General information
- Type: Stadium, residential, hotel, retail, office
- Location: London, England, United Kingdom
- Coordinates: 51°36′17.1″N 0°03′59.1″W
- Construction started: 2012
- Completed: 2015–present (incomplete)
- Cost: Estimated at around £850 million
- Owner: Tottenham Hotspur F.C.
- Operator: Tottenham Hotspur F.C.

Design and construction
- Architecture firm: Stadium Architect Populous Other Developments Allies and Morrison; Donald Insall Associates; F3 architects
- Structural engineer: schlaich bergermann partner Buro Happold
- Main contractor: Mace; McLaren Construction

Other information
- Seating capacity: 62,062 (stadium)
- Number of stores: 2
- Number of rooms: 180 (hotel)

The Northumberland Development Project is a mixed-use development project that centres around Tottenham Hotspur Stadium in London, England. On opening in April 2019, the stadium had a capacity for 62,062 spectators, later increased to 62,303, and was designed to host football as well as NFL games. The development plans also include 585 new homes, a 180-room hotel, a local community health centre, the Tottenham Experience, a Spurs museum and club shop, an extreme sports facility, as well as the Lilywhite House, which contains a Sainsbury's supermarket, a sixth form college and the club's headquarters.

Plans for the project were first announced in 2008 and a planning application submitted in 2009. The project however was revised several times and delayed due to objections by conservation groups and a protracted dispute over a compulsory purchase order (CPO) on existing businesses at the proposed development site. A revised plan was first approved in 2010 by the Haringey Council, and following further revisions, building started in September 2012. Only part of this initial plan was executed, and the construction of the stadium did not commence until 2016 after the CPO dispute has been resolved and a new design approved by Haringey Council. The stadium opening date was revised several times but eventually opened during the 2018–19 season on 3 April 2019.

The new stadium also serves as a venue for at least two of the National Football League (NFL)'s London Games each season. The NFL invested £10 million ($12.8m) in Tottenham's new stadium, just over 1% of the budget. The stadium features the world's first dividing retractable pitch, and it is the first stadium in the UK to have two pitches inside: a retractable grass pitch for football, and a synthetic surface underneath for NFL games and other events. The project is estimated to cost around £1 billion and is intended to be a catalyst for a wider regeneration scheme in Tottenham.

== Origin ==
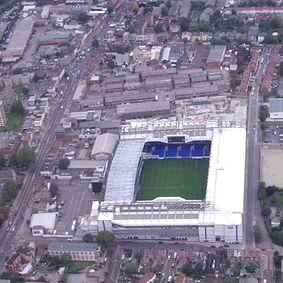
Aerial view from the south of White Hart Lane before redevelopment. The Wingate industrial estate was located to the north of stadium. A great part of the area here would be rebuilt in the Northumberland Development Project.

Beginning in the 1980s, the Tottenham home ground White Hart Lane was redeveloped, and in order to comply with the recommendation of the Taylor Report, it was turned into an all-seater stadium. The capacity of the stadium was reduced from 50,000 in 1979 to around 36,000 by the time it was completed in 1998. The capacity was by then lower than other major English clubs with many of these clubs also planning to expand further, and Tottenham began to explore ways of increasing the stadium capacity so that it could better compete financially with other clubs.

Various options were considered over a number of years. In 2000, the club under Alan Sugar submitted a plan to rebuild the East Stand as a three-tier structure to increase the ground capacity to 44,000. As the stadium was hemmed in by other buildings and conservation areas that limited expansion, the club in 2001 (by then owned by ENIC) also considered moving to a proposed new stadium in Picketts Lock planned to be used for the 2005 World Athletics Championships. The Picketts Lock plan however fell through when the government decided that it was too expensive and scrapped the plan, while the East Stand plan was also shelved in 2004 due to concerns over transport infrastructure and council objections. Other suggestions were mooted, including ground-share with rival Arsenal, and buying Wembley Stadium.

In 2007, the club announced that it was considering redevelopment of the current site or a move to a new site, although no firm decision on the preferred option was made. While the various proposals were being considered, the club also bought up properties around White Hart Lane when they became available. In April 2008 it was revealed in the press that investigations were taking place into the possible use of the Wingate industrial estate immediately adjacent to the north of White Hart Lane. If planning permission were to be granted and there was agreement of the existing businesses there, a 55–60,000-seat stadium could be constructed on the White Hart Lane site. This proposal would become the Northumberland Development Project.

In 2010, so as to keep all options open, the club also registered an interest in using the Olympic Stadium after the London 2012 Olympics. Tottenham proposed that the stadium be demolished, and a new 60,000-capacity football stadium without a running track be built in its place, at the same time offering to redevelop the stadium at Crystal Palace National Sports Centre as an athletics stadium. However, the government indicated that the running track should be retained at the Olympic Stadium, and the bid was won by West Ham United in 2011 as it was committed to keeping the track. After its attempts to overturn the Olympic Park Legacy Company's decision failed, the club abandoned the Olympic Stadium bid in October 2011. It focused its attention on the Northumberland Development Project, and announced its commitment to the building of a new stadium in Tottenham in January 2012.

== Planning history ==
=== First plans ===
First design for the Northumberland Development Project, the old buildings on High Road would be demolished to create a public square in this plan, which led to objections. The stadium itself was later redesigned.

In November 2007, it was reported that the club was considering the building of a new 52,000-capacity stadium, to be masterminded by Tony Winterbottom, formerly of the London Development Agency, who had worked on development of Arsenal's Emirates Stadium. In this plan the club would leave White Hart Lane for two seasons, possibly sharing ground with West Ham. In October 2008, the club announced that it was planning for the Northumberland Development Project with a 60,000-capacity stadium. In December 2008, images for the new stadium were released, followed by plans for the project with a 58,000-capacity stadium in April 2009 for public consultation. In this plan, the new stadium would be built alongside the existing White Hart Lane. The stadium was designed by KSS Design Group, While the project masterplan was by Make Architects and it contained a public square and two amphitheatres designed by Martha Schwartz Partners, with Buro Happold responsible for the engineering and technical aspects of the build. In October 2009, planning application for a 56,000-seat stadium including proposal for 434 new homes, a 150-room hotel, a club museum and shop, and a supermarket was submitted, with a view to start construction in 2010. However, the plan to demolish eight locally listed buildings and two nationally listed buildings was criticised by English Heritage, and the Government's advisory body on architecture, the Commission for Architecture and the Built Environment, as well as other conservation groups.

In response to the objections, the club withdrew its planning application in favour of a revised plan in May 2010. This plan retained some of the listed buildings (although the Grade II-listed Fletcher House would still be demolished), reduced the number of new-build residential houses and improved the public spaces. The revised planning application was approved by the Planning Committee of Haringey Council on 30 September 2010, followed by the then-Mayor of London, Boris Johnson, on 25 November 2010. The Secretary of State for Environment, Food and Rural Affairs indicated that she would not call in the planning application and that English Heritage would not seek further consideration of the listed building consent application for the project on 9 December 2010. Nevertheless, the club chairman Daniel Levy suggested that the project may not be viable due to the increasing costs that came from the requirements demanded by Haringey Council, Transport for London and English Heritage, and that the club may leave the area for the Olympic Stadium.

In August 2011, rioting started in a deprived area of Tottenham, which concentrated the minds of the local authority keen to keep Spurs in the community. On 20 September 2011, the club concluded the Section 106 agreement with Haringey Council to pay for local facilities in the area should the project go ahead, and planning permission was granted. The Greater London Authority and Haringey Council announced on 28 September that it would relieve the club of all community infrastructure payments that planners would normally require, estimated at £8.5m, and to provide a further £8.5m for regeneration and infrastructure projects. In a joint statement with Haringey Council in January 2012, Tottenham announced that it would stay in North Tottenham and work with the council to rejuvenate the area. The Section 106 agreement was revised by the Haringey Council in February 2012; the council waived the requirement for 50% affordable housing in the development, and the £16.436m investment in the community was reduced to £0.477m.

Tottenham Hotspur had originally planned to move into the new stadium, while it was partially built, for the beginning of the 2012–13 season, and the stadium would be completed by the end of the following season. The project however was delayed by the need to submit revised plans and a protracted dispute over the purchase of a factory on Paxton Road, and the completion date was put back to 2016, then to the summer 2017. Only part of the plan, the construction of Lilywhite House, would be implemented while the dispute was ongoing, and the rest of the scheme was later redesigned.

=== Compulsory purchase order proceedings ===
In March 2012, Haringey Council approved plans to hand over council-owned land in the redevelopment area, including part of Wingate Trading Estate as well as Paxton Road and Bill Nicholson Way, to Spurs. It also agreed on a Compulsory Purchase Order (CPO) to buy the remaining property on Paxton Road belonging to Archway Sheet Metal Works that had yet to sell to Spurs. In April 2013 a Public Inquiry was held about the last remaining property to be acquired. Following this, the Planning Inspector recommended refusal of Haringey's application for a Compulsory Purchase Order in his report dated 24 September 2013, because he thought it was unacceptable that the London Borough of Haringey had waived the affordable housing requirement in the original S.106 Agreement.

On 11 July 2014, a much delayed decision by Eric Pickles, the Secretary of State for the Department for Communities and Local Government, agreed with a compulsory purchase order made by the London Borough of Haringey enabling the project to proceed. In September 2014, the remaining business with two plots on the development site, Archway Sheet Metal Works, initiated a legal challenge in the High Court that the compulsory purchase order was unlawful and invalid. In November 2014, Archway Sheet Metal was subjected to a suspected arson attack, which destroyed their factory on the site. On 20 February 2015, the High Court judge ruled that the compulsory purchase order was legal and valid. He also refused permission to appeal though it could be referred directly to the Court of Appeal, which on 13 March 2015 Archway Steel confirmed to the Club it would not be pursuing. On 31 March 2015, in a joint statement the Club and Archway Sheet Metal Works announced that agreement had been concluded on the sale of the remaining plots on the Paxton Road required for the development to proceed.

=== New plans ===
Northumberland Development Project

In October 2013, it was revealed that the club was considering a new plan designed by Populous for a multi-use stadium with a retractable pitch similar to that of Arizona Cardinals's home stadium so that it may host American NFL games. On 8 July 2015, it was announced that the club had reached an agreement with NFL to hold a minimum of two NFL games a year in a 10-year partnership. The same day a new design team was also announced alongside a revised project and stadium design: Populous for the stadium design and masterplan, the hotel and the visitor attractions; Allies and Morrison for the new homes; and Donald Insall Associates as heritage architect. The new stadium would have a higher capacity of 61,000 (later raised to 62,062), a larger single-tier stand of 17,000 capacity together with a retractable grass pitch that reveals an artificial surface underneath designed for NFL games. There would also be a 180 bedroom hotel, 579 new homes, an extreme sports centre and a community health centre. A ticket office Paxton Building was later added in 2016. The High Road pavement would be widened which required the demolition of three locally listed buildings (Edmonton Dispensary, The Red House, and the former White Hart public house). Warmington House, the Grade II listed building, would be kept and turned into the club museum, part of Tottenham Experience that includes a club store. The opening date of the new stadium was also revised to the 2018/19 season.

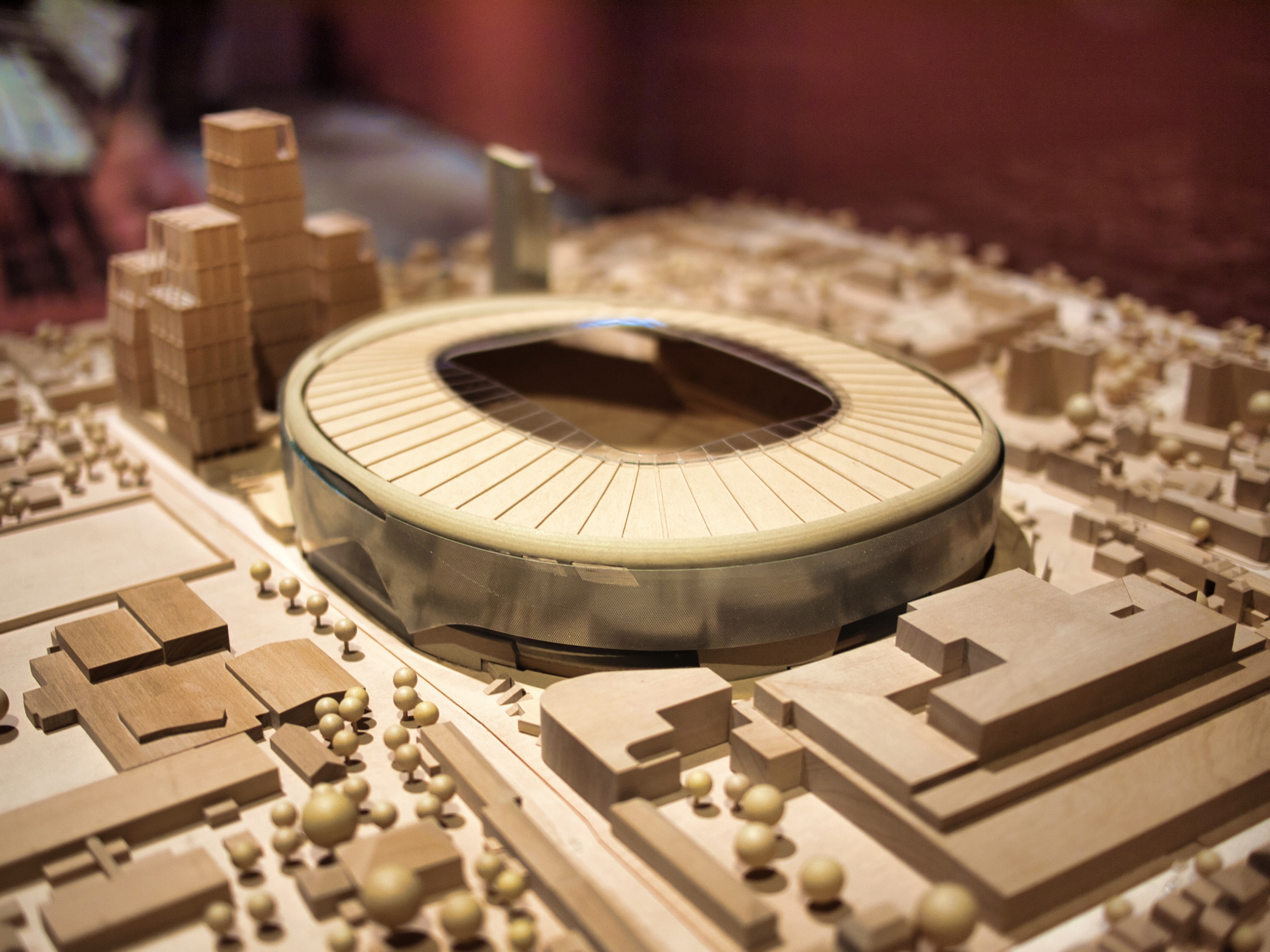
Models of buildings in the Northumberland Development Project

In December 2015, the revised plans were approved by Haringey Council, including the demolition of locally listed buildings. The Mayor of London Boris Johnson also gave formal approval of the plan in February 2016. Tottenham Hotspur indicated that, to mitigate delays that occurred in the planning process and accelerate the construction of the new stadium, it would relocate on a temporary basis to an alternative stadium venue. Several stadia were mooted for ground-sharing, including Wembley Stadium and the Milton Keynes Dons' ground Stadium mk, the Boleyn Ground in Upton Park, and the London Stadium in Stratford. After some time it was announced on 28 May 2016, that Tottenham would play European matches at Wembley from the 2016/17 season, with all home games to be played at the stadium in the 2017/18 season.

== Scope of project ==
The Northumberland Development Project covers an area of around 20 acres (81,000 m^{2}), bordered by Park Lane to the South, Worcester Avenue to the East, Northumberland Park to the North and the High Road to the West.

=== Buildings and facilities ===
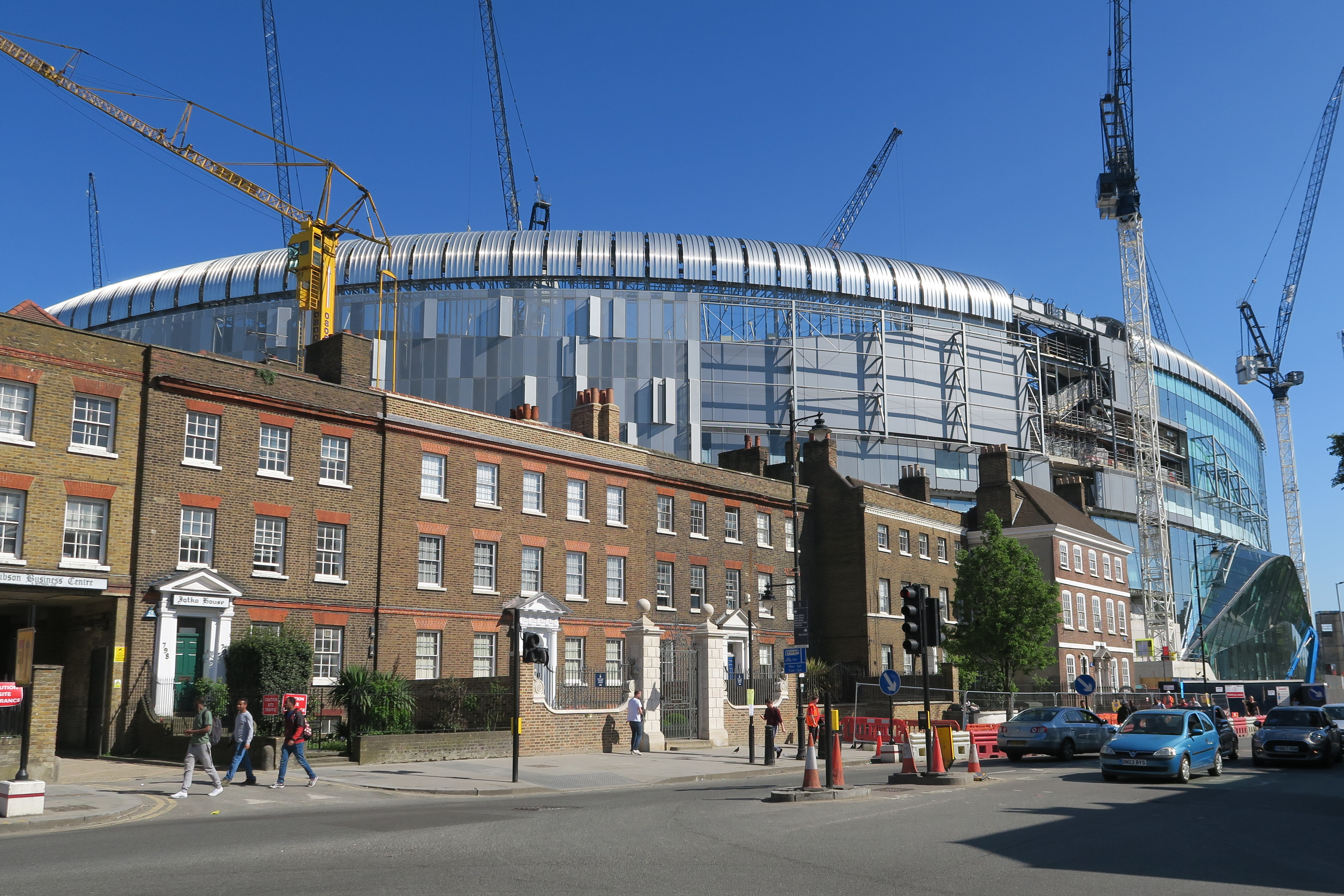
View of stadium from the northwest, Percy House in the terrace in front

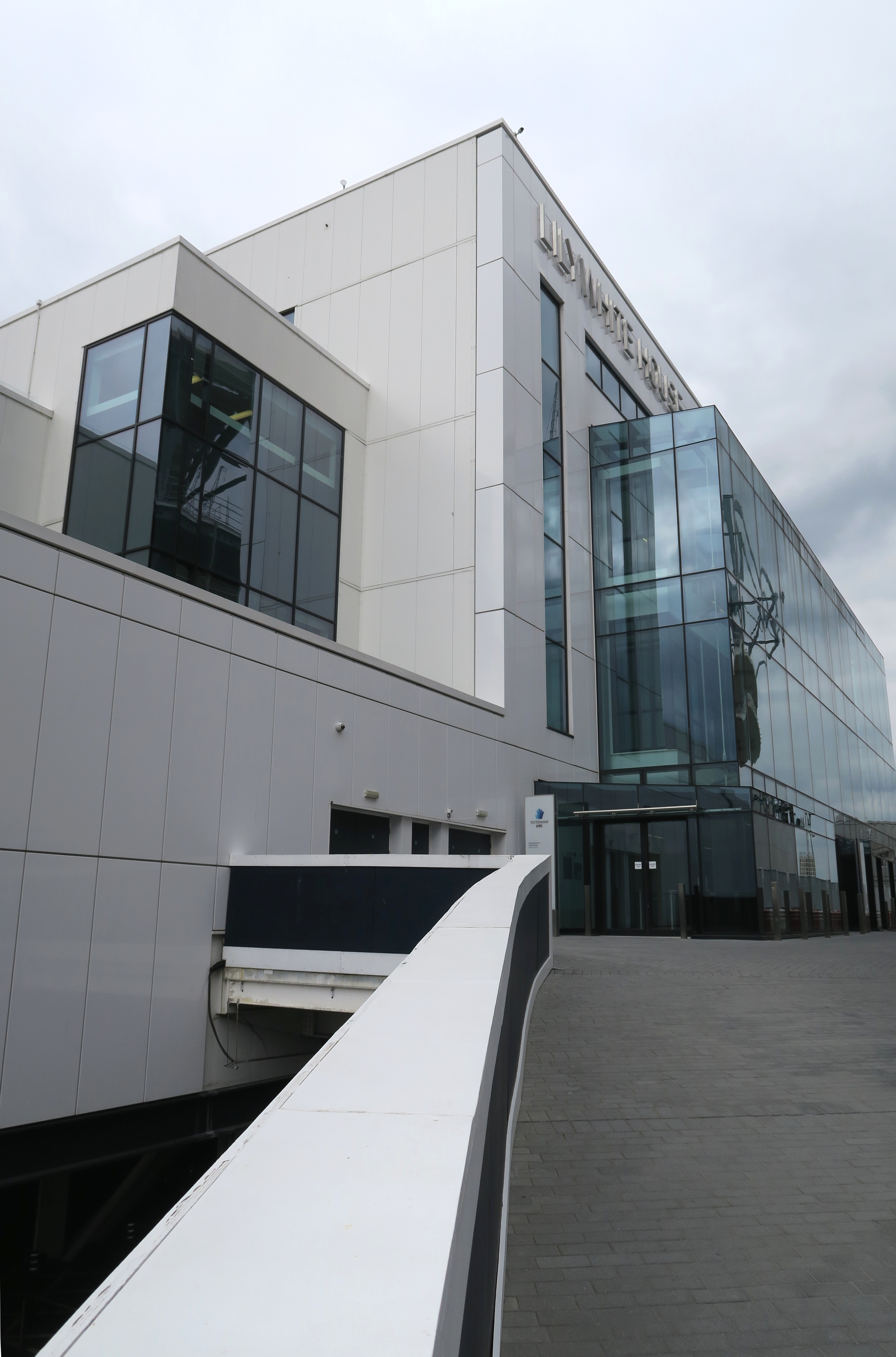
Lilywhite House

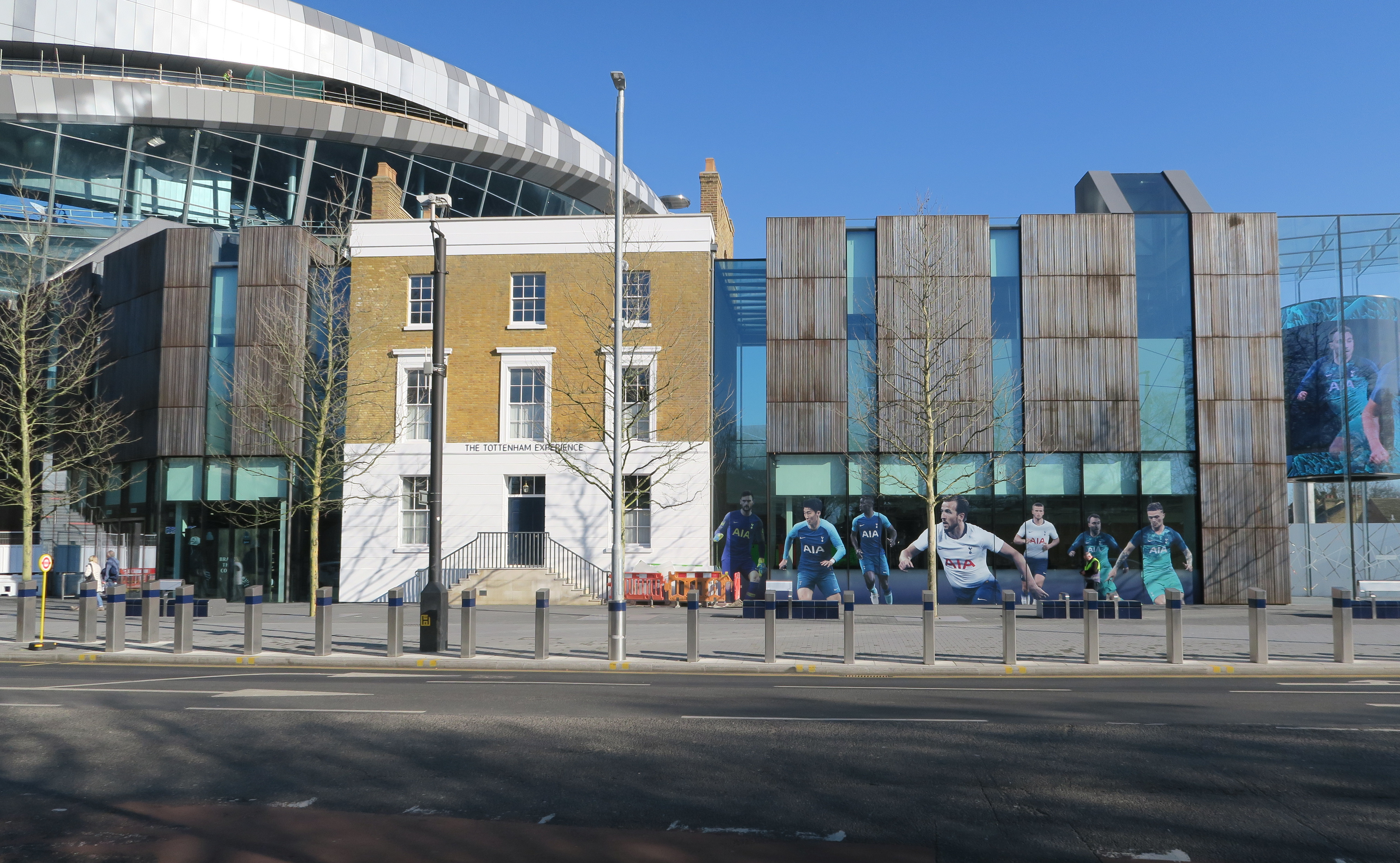
The Tottenham Experience on Tottenham High Road

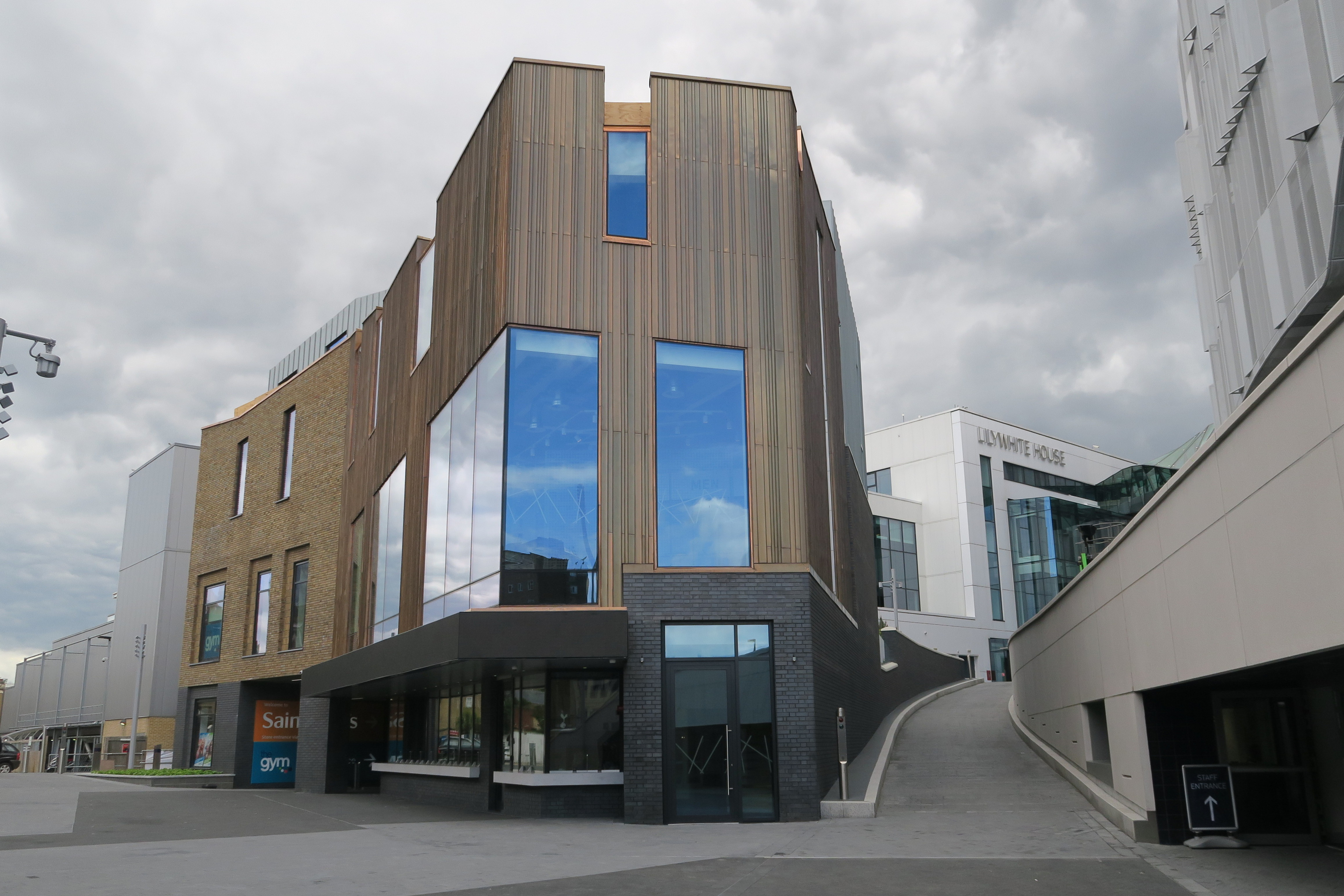
Paxton building, the ticket office for the stadium

The project overall design comprises:

- Tottenham Hotspur Stadium – the stadium is an enclosed asymmetric bowl with a capacity of 62,062, and it includes a single-tier stand with 17,500 seats influenced by Borussia Dortmund's Signal Iduna Park. It incorporates a fully retractable grass pitch over a Turf Nation synthetic turf pitch to be used for NFL games as well as other sports, concerts and events. In order to enhance the atmosphere on match days, the stands are placed closed to the pitch with the north and south stands just 5 metres (16.4 ft) away, and the stadium is designed with good acoustics in mind. The south stand, the 'Home End', features a 5-storey atrium. It also offers separate facilities for football and NFL players, with dedicated entrance for NFL in the east stand. Four LED screens are placed in the stadium, the two in the south are the largest of any stadium in Western Europe. The stadium is intended to be active all year round with visitor attractions such as a Sky Walk that allows visitors to climb to the roof of the stadium. Some car parking is provided underneath the stand and in the basement.
- Tottenham Experience – it incorporates the Grade II listed Warmington House which serves as the club museum, and new buildings that will serve as an arrival hub and visitors centre, and will include a cinema, club store, ticket office and café.
- Lilywhite House – the Tottenham Hotspur club headquarters
- Other ancillary club buildings – the Paxton Building to the northwest of the stadium will be the ticket office. The Northern Terrace, a row of Georgian houses on the north west corner of the site would be restored and renovated, with Percy House used as the home for the Tottenham Hotspur Foundation.
- Public spaces – this includes a large public open space on the south podium that incorporates a multi-use games area with five-a-side pitches, food stalls and cafes, and the redevelopment of the High Road for improved crowd management.
- Housing – 585 new homes including affordable housing, to be built in 4 towers ranging in height from 16 to 32 storeys.
- Sports centre – an extreme sports venue, including the tallest indoor climbing wall in the world and an indoor dive tank.
- Hotel – a 180 bedroom hotel with 49 serviced apartments on the upper floors.
- Community facilities – a new community health centre.
- Retail spaces – the Sainsbury's supermarket with parking space forms part of the Lilywhite House, with club offices above it. The club shop which forms part of the Tottenham Experience would be the largest club shop in Europe. The megastore would feature a 100-seat auditorium and a 36-screen video wall that may be used for events before and after football matches. Another store will be located in the ticket office Paxton Building.
- Education establishments – A college, the University Technical College, was initially located in the Lilywhite House. It specialised in sports, science and health in partnership with Middlesex University. But in September 2017 it was replaced by the London Academy of Excellence Tottenham. A primary school, Brook House Primary School, run by the E-ACT Free Schools Trust in partnership with the Department for Education and the club was built in a nearby site.

=== Regeneration and infrastructure projects ===
The Northumberland Development Project is intended to be the catalyst for a 20-year regeneration program planned by the Haringey Council to spur on growth and wider changes in Tottenham. This includes developments in Tottenham Hale, Tottenham Green and Seven Sisters, Northumberland Park, and other areas. This wider regeneration plan aims to create 10,000 new homes, 5,000 new jobs, new schools and commercial spaces, as well as improved transport, leisure amenities and public facilities by 2025. When completed, the Northumberland Development Project itself would support 3,500 jobs, of which 1,700 are new jobs, with an estimated annual injection of £293 million into the local economy.

Among the various proposals of direct relevance to the stadium is the High Road West regeneration scheme to redevelop the area between the stadium and White Hart Lane station. This involves the mass clearance of existing homes and businesses in the area, the rebuilding of White Hart Lane station and the creation of a walkway for fans from the station to the stadium, and the building of new apartments and leisure amenities. This regeneration scheme is associated with the Northumberland Development Project and involves the club. The proposal and the nearby Goods Yard development are controversial given the high levels of deprivation in Tottenham and the high levels of demand for social housing. One of the first schemes involving the club to be completed is the Cannon Road development located to the north of the High Road West area. It opened in 2015 and included 222 affordable home and the 400-pupil Brook House Primary School. The development of High Road West, however, has stalled.

One aim of the project is to improve the public transport in the area with the new stadium designated a 'Public Transport Destination'. The Northumberland Park, Tottenham Hale and White Hart Lane station train station would be reconstructed, with investment to improve frequency of trains, and new shuttle bus links and better pedestrian connections planned. The club intends to rename the White Hart Lane station to Tottenham Hotspur.

The club, which is a founding participant of the 10:10 environmental campaign has summarised the energy saving measures and other environmentally friendly elements of the project which it claims will reduce carbon dioxide emissions by around 40% compared to current Building Regulation requirements and make it one of the most environmentally sustainable stadiums in the United Kingdom.

== Cost and funding ==
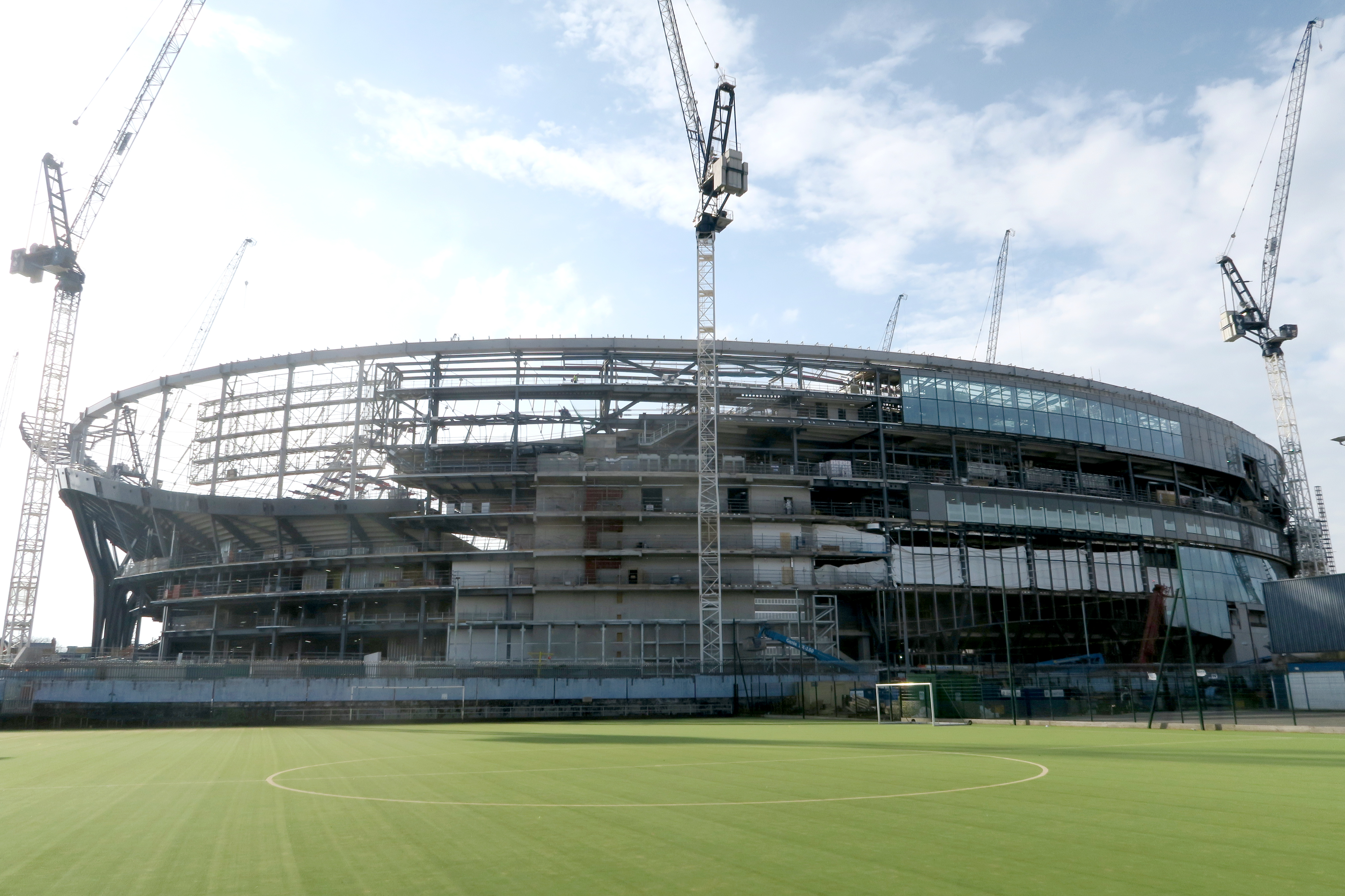
New stadium under construction, view from east

The first plan of 2007 was initially estimated to cost around £300 million, raised to around £400 million in 2009 for a revised plan, then to £430 million in 2012. Phase 1 of this plan was projected to cost £45 million, Phase 2 which includes the construction of the stadium at £305 million, and Phase 3 at £80 million. After Phase 1 of this plan had been completed, a new plan with different designs for the stadium and other buildings was submitted in 2015, and this new plan was projected to cost £400 million. Cost however had escalated in the course of construction, with the project estimated to cost £850 million in 2018. Part of the increase was a result of the higher cost of import due to the effect of the Brexit vote on the exchange rate, changes to the built, overtime working and higher construction cost. In April 2019, club chairman Levy said that the cost is of the order of £1 billion.

On 21 August 2009 Tottenham Hotspur made a Stock Exchange announcement that it was issuing 30 million new shares to raise £15 million to fund the first stage of the proposed development. The funds related specifically to the professional costs required to advance the project to the point where a full planning application could be submitted. The club's major shareholder, ENIC International Ltd subscribed to take up 27.8 million of the shares. On 22 July 2011, a supporter group, Supporting Our Future, submitted a proposal for a £50 million funding initiative to Spurs to support the Northumberland Development Project by way of a Community Share scheme. This proposal was presented after polling Spurs fans on their views of the club and Northumberland Park Development, and extensive consultation with the club, Haringey Council, and Supporters Direct. £27 million of local and central government funding was pledged to improve the infrastructure and public spaces in the Northumberland Park regeneration zone planned by Haringey Council. NFL contributed £10 million to provide American football accommodations in exchange for allowing at least two NFL games per year in the stadium.

The club announced in April 2014 that it had divested some 'non-core' properties to the west of the High Road relating to phase 1 of the project to TH Property Limited, a subsidiary of ENIC, with the proceeds used to pay down debt secured against those properties. In December 2015, a £200m interim financing facility was arranged with three banks to fund the relocation, planning and development. In May 2017, the club announced a £400 million five-year loan deal with the banks, replacing the £200 million previously in place, to fund the remaining built. The bank also provided a £25m working capital facility, while the owner of Tottenham Hotspur, ENIC, supported the stadium financing with a £50 million letter of credit. By this stage, £340 million had already been spent on land acquisition, the planning process as well as construction cost; £100 million of this came from the interim financing, with the rest from the club resources. In 2018, it was announced that due to spiralling cost, the club had to borrow an extra £237 million, raising the financing facility to £637m. In order to reduce debt-servicing costs and improve annual cash flow, £525 million of the debt was refinanced by issuing bonds that will mature in 15 to 30 years' time. The bond issue was arranged by Bank of America Merrill Lynch, which also provided a £112m loan.

Instead of maintaining the White Hart Lane name, the club plans to pursue corporate sponsorship of the stadium, with Spurs eyeing potential suitors in the UAE and FedEx. The club was looking for a 20-year deal worth £20m annually.

== Construction ==
The project was planned to be completed in phases.

=== Phase 1 ===
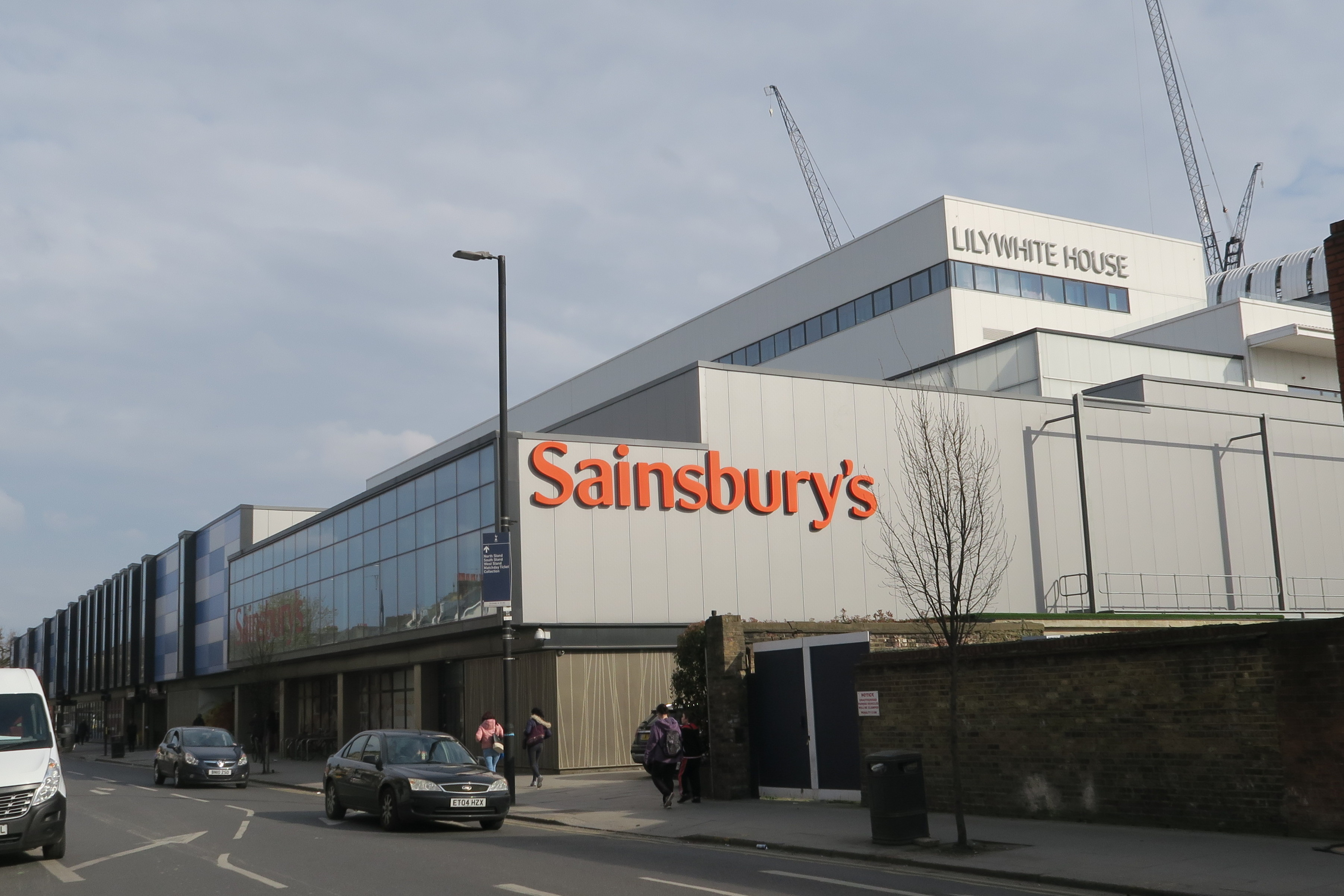
First building completed in the project - Lilywhite House with Sainsbury's on Northumberland Park

The first phase involved the building of Lilywhite House to the north of the White Hart Lane to house the club offices. This building incorporates a Sainsbury's supermarket and the University Technical College of Tottenham. McLaren was the main contractor of the project.

Phase 1 of the project started in September 2012 with work on the Sainsbury's site. The supermarket covers an area of 72,000 square feet (6,700 m^{2}) of sales floor space with car parking space at ground level intended for match day and non-match day use, together with an additional 110,000 square feet (10,000 m^{2}) of floor space above the supermarket for the club's offices and the college.

Sainsbury's opened in November 2013, and the University Technical College of Tottenham opened in September 2014 (the college however closed in 2017 and the site was then used by London Academy of Excellence Tottenham). In February 2015, the club announced that Lilywhite House of the Phase 1 development had been completed.

=== Phase 2 ===
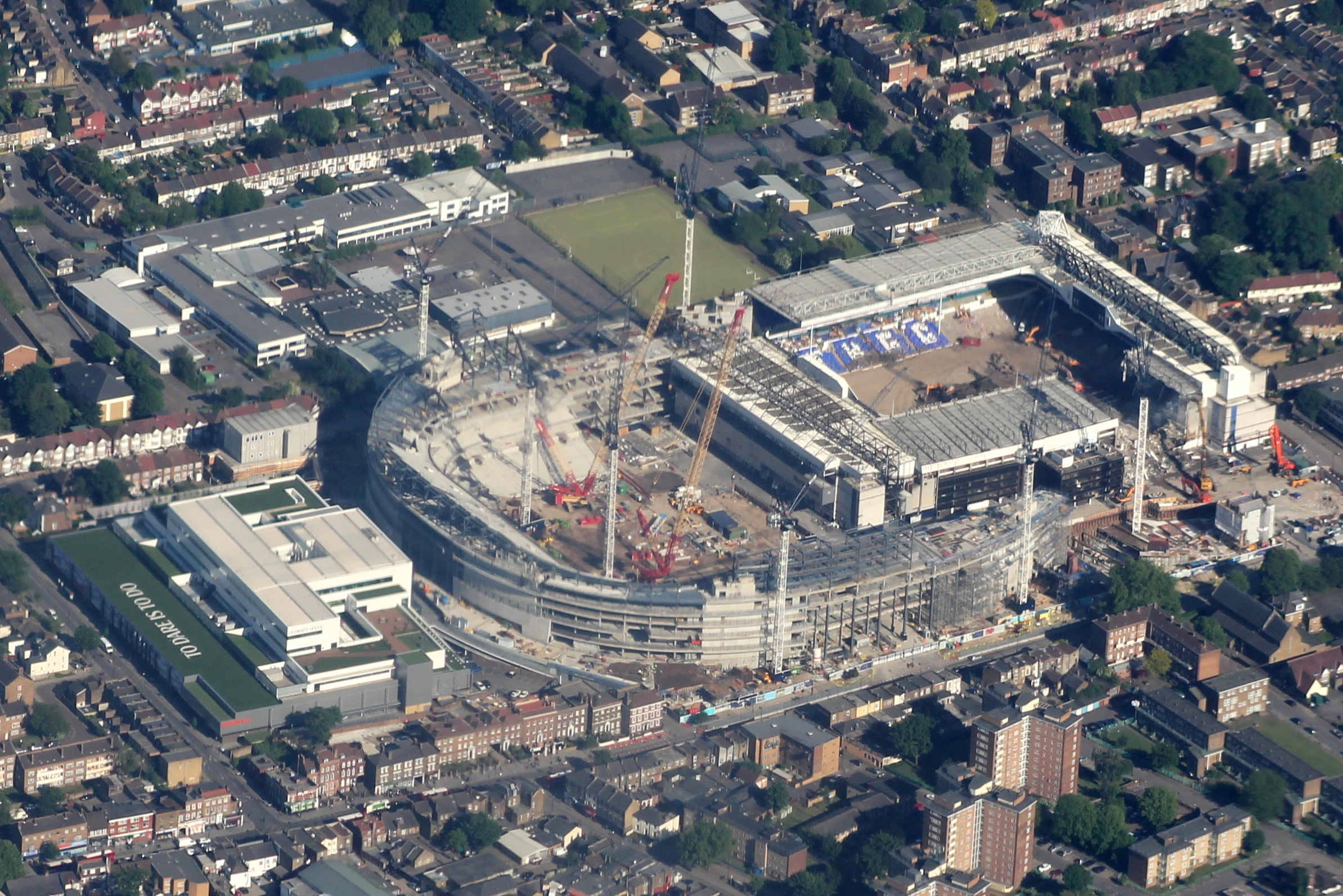
Northern section of the new stadium under construction in May 2017, West Stand of White Hart Lane partially demolished

The second phase involved the construction of the stadium and the Tottenham Experience, scheduled to be completed in the summer of 2018. Mace was contracted to construct the stadium. The construction of the stadium was conducted in two main stages so that the White Hart Lane stadium could still be used for the 2016–17 season while the construction was in progress. The first phase involved the construction of the northern section of the new stadium (including the north, west and most of the east stands), while the south stand would be started in the second stage the existing stadium had been demolished. Large parts the land north of the existing stadium was cleared by 2014 while the Archway Steel CPO dispute was ongoing. After the dispute was resolved, preliminary work on the basement began in the summer of 2015, with concrete and ground works for the foundation by the subcontractor Morrisroe starting in autumn 2015 based on earlier approved and amended plans.

Construction of stadium

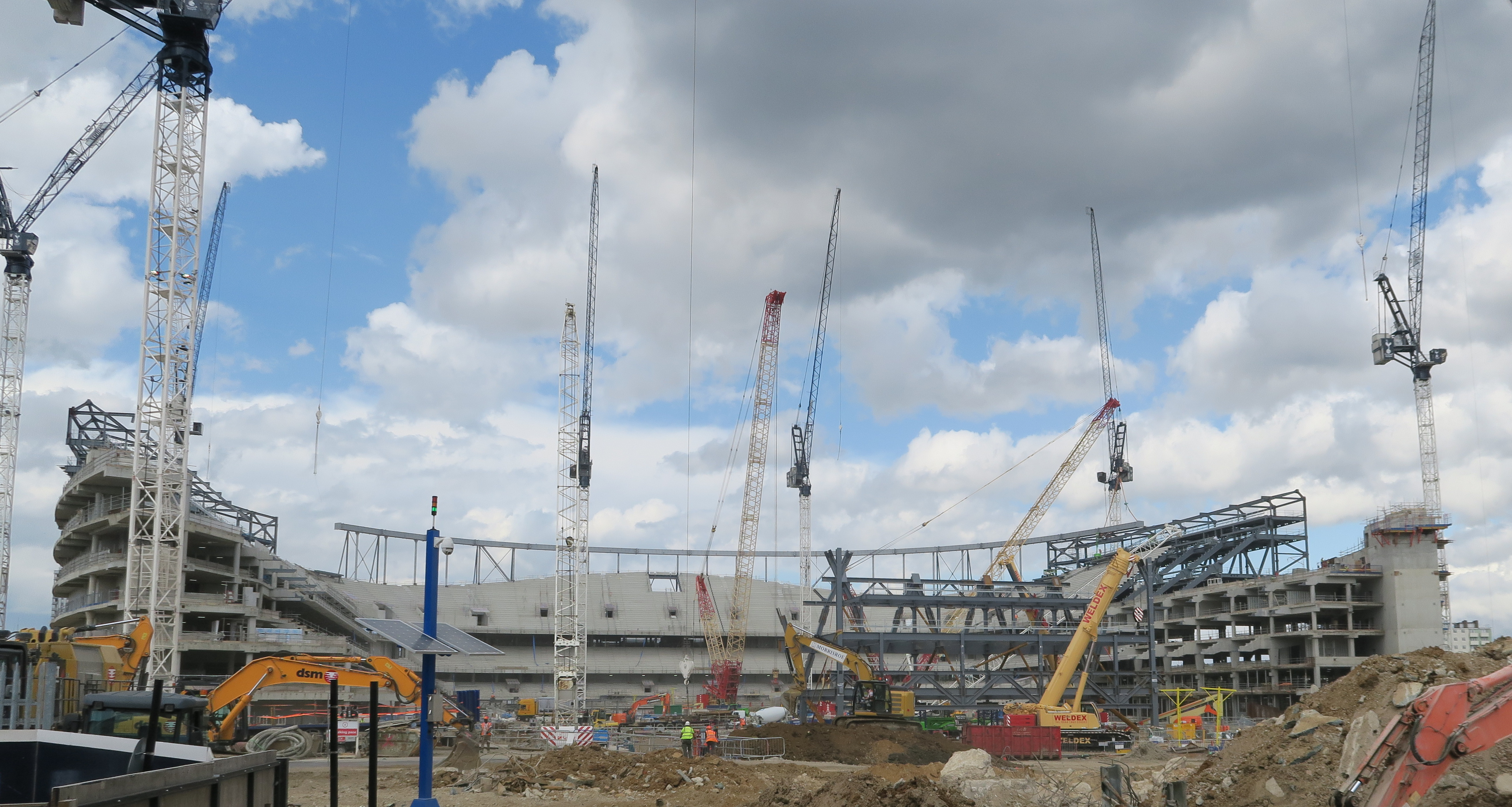
White Hart Lane demolished, northern concrete section built August 2017

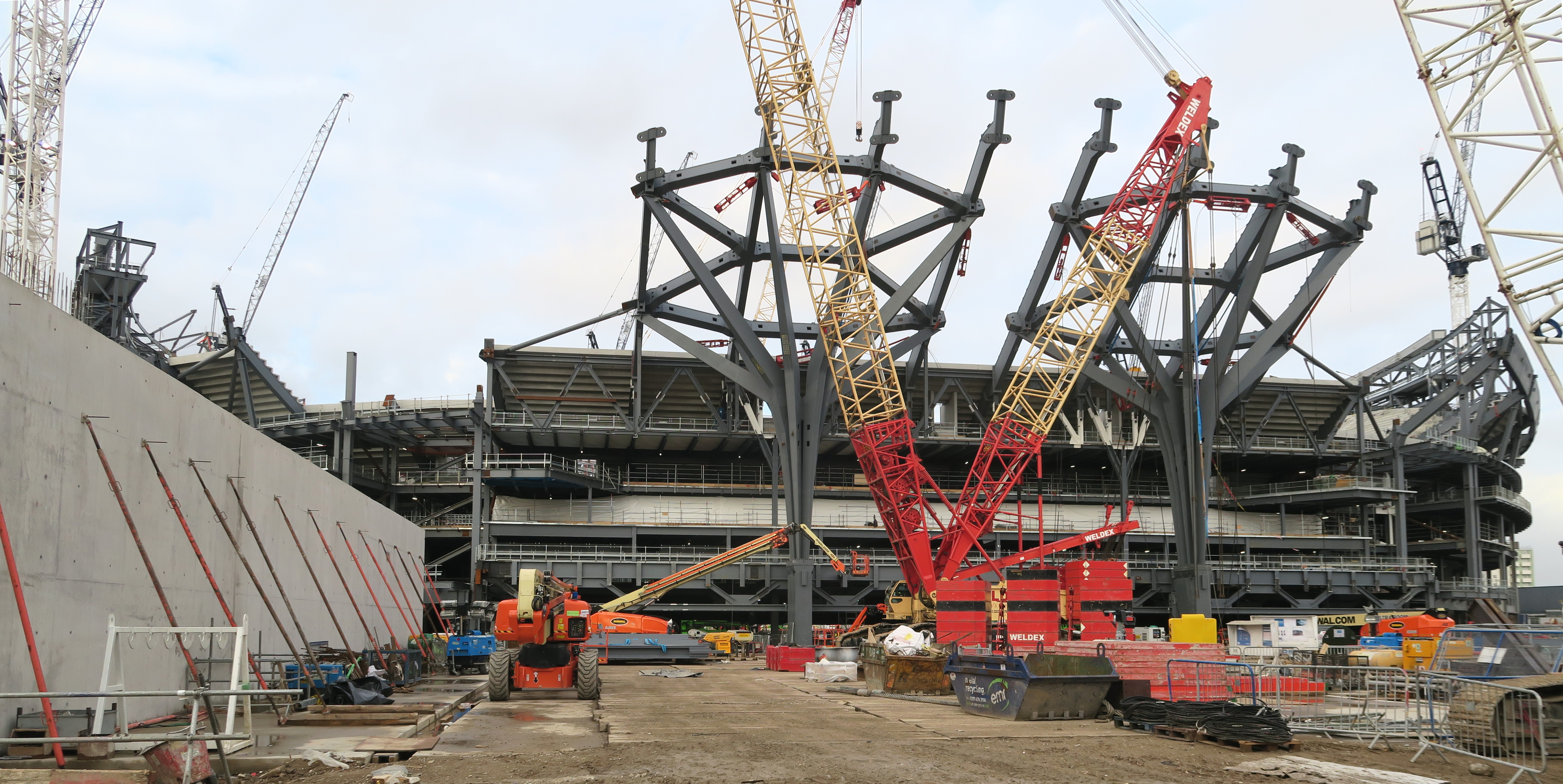
Two steel "tree" supports for the South Stand erected in December 2017

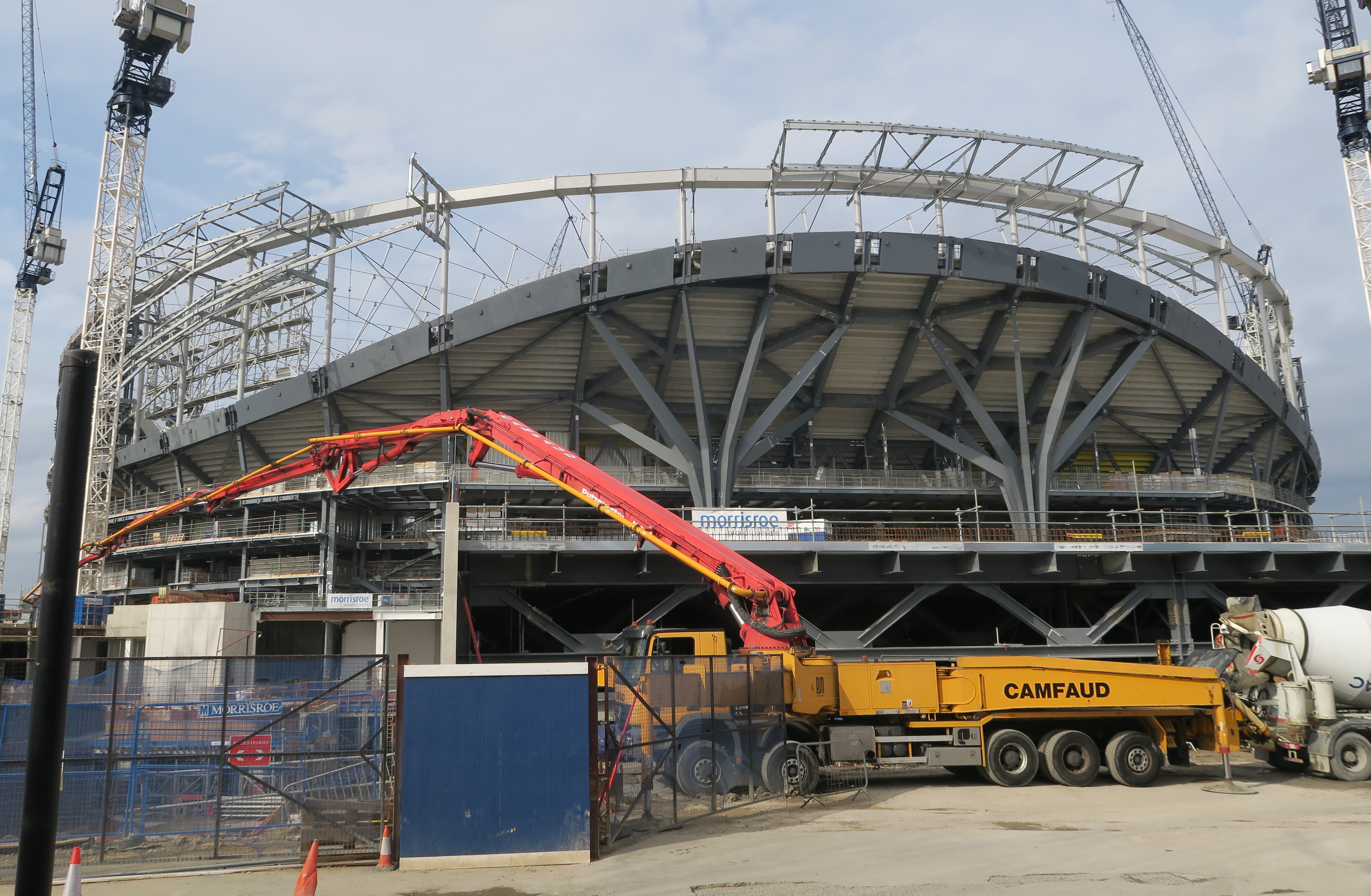
Compression ring with cable net roof structure installed in April 2018.

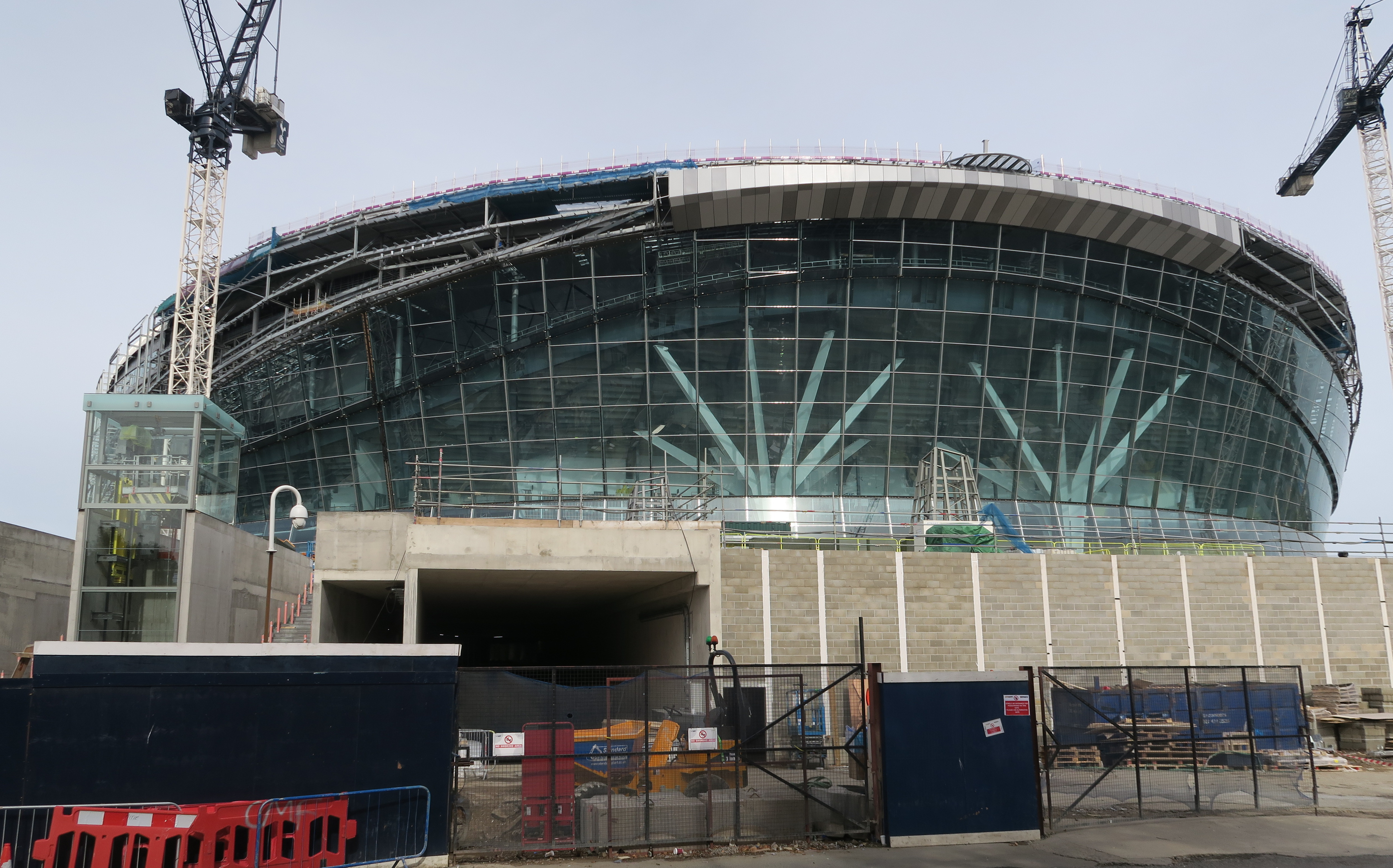
Cladding nearing completion, October 2018

The new plan for the project was given final approval in February 2016, which allowed construction of the upper sections of the new stadium itself to start soon after. In order to facilitate the construction of northern section of the stadium while matches of the final season were still being played at the Lane, its northeast corner was demolished during the summer of 2016 after the 2015–16 season. From the basement to level 6, the construction of this section is in reinforced concrete. Three further levels above are constructed in steel frame. There are only six vertical cores for vertical circulation instead of the eight expected of a stadium of this size as they needed to be constructed within the first phase of the stadium construction.

Demolition of the remainder of the White Hart Lane stadium began immediately after the last home match of the 2016–17 season, and was completed by August 2017. Piling work for Phase 2 of the stadium construction had started in June 2017. While the northern section constructed in the first phase is a largely concrete structure, the entire single-tier south stand has a steel frame which allowed speedier construction. Two steel "trees", erected in December 2017, support the south stand, which will be the largest single-tier stand in the UK.

The compression ring that holds the cable net roof structure was completed in February 2018, and the roof lift operation to raise the cable net roof structure to the top of the stadium, which took several weeks, was performed in March 2018.

Parts of the old White Hart Lane were incorporated into the development – crushed aggregate of the concrete foundation of White Hart Lane was mixed in with new concrete to create the floor of the concourse of the new stadium, and bricks from the East Stand were used for the Shelf Bar. The frontage of the demolished Tottenham and Edmonton Dispensary is also incorporated into the Tottenham Experience. The gate to the West Stand of White Hart Lane, the Bill Nicholson Gates, will be incorporated into the scheme on the south west approach to the stadium together with a statue of Bill Nicholson positioned at the centre of the gates.

=== Phase 3 ===
Phase 3 comprises the building of a hotel, a sport centre, a medical centre and homes. Work on the basement of the hotel began while the south stand was still being constructed in late 2017 and early 2018. The construction of the 22-storey hotel was delayed, but permission to build a taller 30-storey hotel was approved by the Haringey Council in December 2023 and Greater London Authority in March 2024. The hotel will have the third-largest conference venue in London. Work on the 180-room hotel as well as 49 residential flats began in August 2024, and scheduled to be completed in readiness for UEFA Euro 2028 in June 2028.

== Opening ==
The club shop opened on 23 October 2018. After repeated delays, two test events open to the public and with increasing levels of attendance necessary for the issuing of safety certificate were held in March 2019. The stadium opened with a ceremony on 3 April 2019 before its first competitive Premier League game, which was against Crystal Palace.

== See also ==
- Development of stadiums in English football
