= Mace (construction company) =

Global consultancy firm

Mace Group Ltd
- Industry: Construction
- Founded: 1990
- Headquarters: London
- Number of locations: London, New York City, Nairobi, Johannesburg, Hong Kong, Dubai/Doha; operates in over 70 countries.
- Key people: Mark Reynolds (Group Chair and CEO)
- Revenue: ▲£1,936.4 million (2022)
- Operating income: ▲£45.4 million (2022)
- Net income: ▼£22.2 million (2022)
- Number of employees: 7,271 (2022)
- Website: www.macegroup.com

Mace Group Ltd, commonly known as Mace, is a global construction consultancy business headquartered in London with 5,200 global staff. The business previously incorporated a contracting business. In July 2025 Goldman Sachs acquired a 75% share in Mace's consulting business and in March 2026, this became a standalone operation. Spun out as a separate entity, the 2,000-strong construction business ('Mace Construct') will be rebranded as Forco in January 2027.

== History ==
The company was founded by a group of construction and architecture professionals, led by Ian Macpherson, who left Bovis in 1990 hoping to bring in a more collaborative way of working in the traditionally combative construction industry. It prohibited its subcontractors from falsely claiming staff were self-employed.

During 1997, Mace beat Bovis to be appointed as the project and construction manager on British Airways' Waterside headquarters at Heathrow. Other early construction projects undertaken by the company included the London Eye and The Venetian. The firm engaged in PFI projects and post privatisation railway work.

In 2009, Mace contracted to build The Shard, the tallest building in London, at a fixed price. In 2021, it completed a ferris wheel in Dubai nearly twice as tall as the London Eye.

In 2023, Mace's facilities management division was sold in a management buyout. In July 2025 Goldman Sachs acquired a 75% share in Mace's £700m turnover consulting business and it was set to be spun out as a standalone operation with 5,200 global staff. The 2,000-strong construction business was to be rebranded. The two businesses – Mace Construct and Mace Consult – were formally separated on 5 March 2026.

In December 2026, Mace Consult was set to move its London HQ, leaving 155 Moorgate for an office at 10 Queen Street Place.

=== Forco ===
London-based branding agency Koto was hired to develop Mace Construct's new identity. In November 2026, it was announced that Mace Construct would be rebranded as "Forco" with effect from January 2027, when the company would also relocate to a new head office at 6 Devonshire Square, near Liverpool Street station.

== Operations ==
Mace's activities include:

- programme and project management advice
- cost consultancy
- construction

Mace's programme management activities have included advising on the Metrolinx transit system for the Government of Ontario, and, as part of a team with Arcadis, advising on a new railway tunnel in New York.

== Major projects ==
Major projects involving Mace have included:

- The London Eye (2000)
- The Venetian (2007)
- The Emirates Air Line (2012)
- The Shard (2012)
- Tottenham Hotspur Stadium (2019)
- NHS Nightingale Hospital London (2020)
- Universal United Kingdom (due to be completed in 2031)
