= The Shard =

Skyscraper in London, England

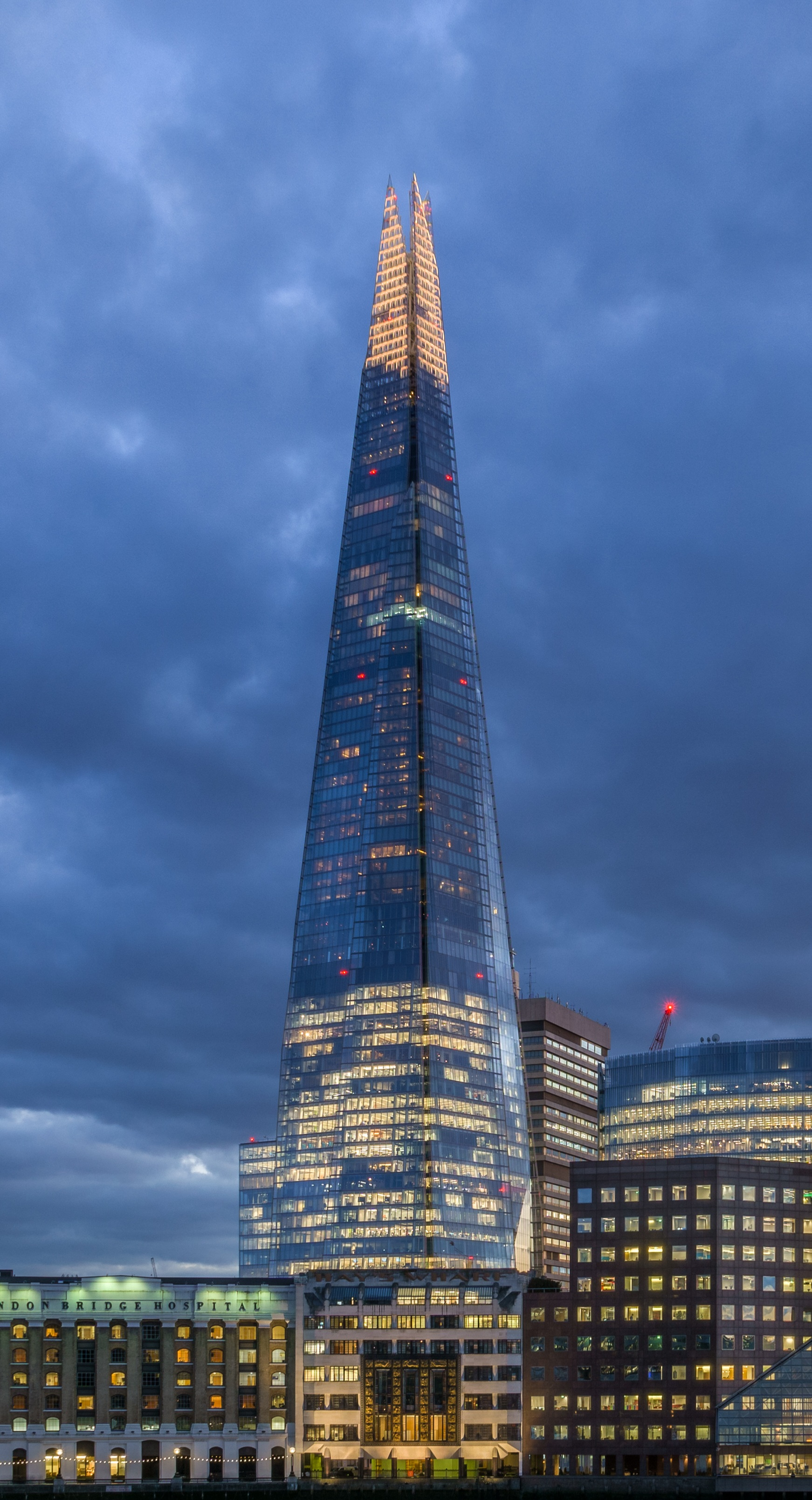
- The Shard in October 2017
- Alternative names: Shard London Bridge

Record height
- Tallest in Europe from 2011 to 2012^{[I]}
- Preceded by: City of Capitals (europe previous); One Canada Square (UK/London previous)
- Surpassed by: Mercury City Tower

General information
- Status: Completed
- Location: London, England
- Coordinates: 51.5045°N 0.0865°W
- Construction started: 16 March 2009
- Completed: 5 July 2012
- Opening: 1 February 2013
- Cost: £435 million (contract cost only)
- Owner: State of Qatar (95%); Sellar Property Group (5%)

Height
- Architectural: 309.6 m (1,016 ft)
- Observatory: 244.3 m (802 ft)

Technical details
- Floor count: 95 (72 habitable)
- Floor area: 1,367,784 sq ft (127,071.3 m^{2})
- Lifts/elevators: 36

Design and construction
- Architects: Renzo Piano Building Workshop, architects in collaboration with Adamson Associates Architects
- Developer: Sellar Property Group
- Structural engineer: WSP Global
- Services engineer: Arup
- Main contractor: Mace

Other information
- Public transit: : : London Bridge Station

Website
- the-shard.com

The Shard, (Note: The building's operators officially stylise its name as The Shard, with the word "the" capitalised.) also referred to as the Shard London Bridge and formerly London Bridge Tower, is a 95-storey mixed-use development supertall pyramid-shaped skyscraper, designed by the Italian architect Renzo Piano, in Southwark, London, that forms part of The Shard Quarter development. Standing 309.6 metres (1,016 feet) high, The Shard is the tallest building in the United Kingdom and Western Europe; and the seventh-tallest building in Europe. The Shard replaced Southwark Towers, a 24-storey office block built on the site in 1975.

The Shard's construction began in March 2009; it was topped out on 30 March 2012 and inaugurated on 5 July 2012. Practical completion was achieved in November 2012. The tower's privately operated observation deck, The View from The Shard, was opened to the public on 1 February 2013. The glass-clad pyramidal tower has 72 habitable floors, with a viewing gallery and open-air observation deck on the 72nd floor, at a height of 244 metres (801 ft). The Shard was developed by Sellar Property Group on behalf of LBQ Ltd and is jointly owned by Sellar Property (5%) and the State of Qatar (95%).

== Background ==
=== Planning ===
In 1998, London-based entrepreneur Irvine Sellar and his partners decided to redevelop the 1970s-era Southwark Towers following a UK government white paper encouraging the development of tall buildings at major transport hubs. Sellar flew to Berlin in the spring of 2000 to meet the Italian architect Renzo Piano for lunch. According to Sellar, Piano spoke of his contempt for conventional tall buildings during the meal, before flipping over the restaurant's menu and sketching a spire-like sculpture emerging from the River Thames.

In July 2002, the Deputy Prime Minister, John Prescott, ordered a planning inquiry after the development plans for the Shard were opposed by the Commission for Architecture and the Built Environment and several heritage bodies, including the Royal Parks Foundation and English Heritage. The inquiry took place in April and May 2003, and on 19 November 2003, the Office of the Deputy Prime Minister announced that planning consent had been approved. The government stated that:

Mr Prescott would only approve skyscrapers of exceptional design. For a building of this size to be acceptable, the quality of its design is critical. He is satisfied that the proposed tower is of the highest architectural quality.

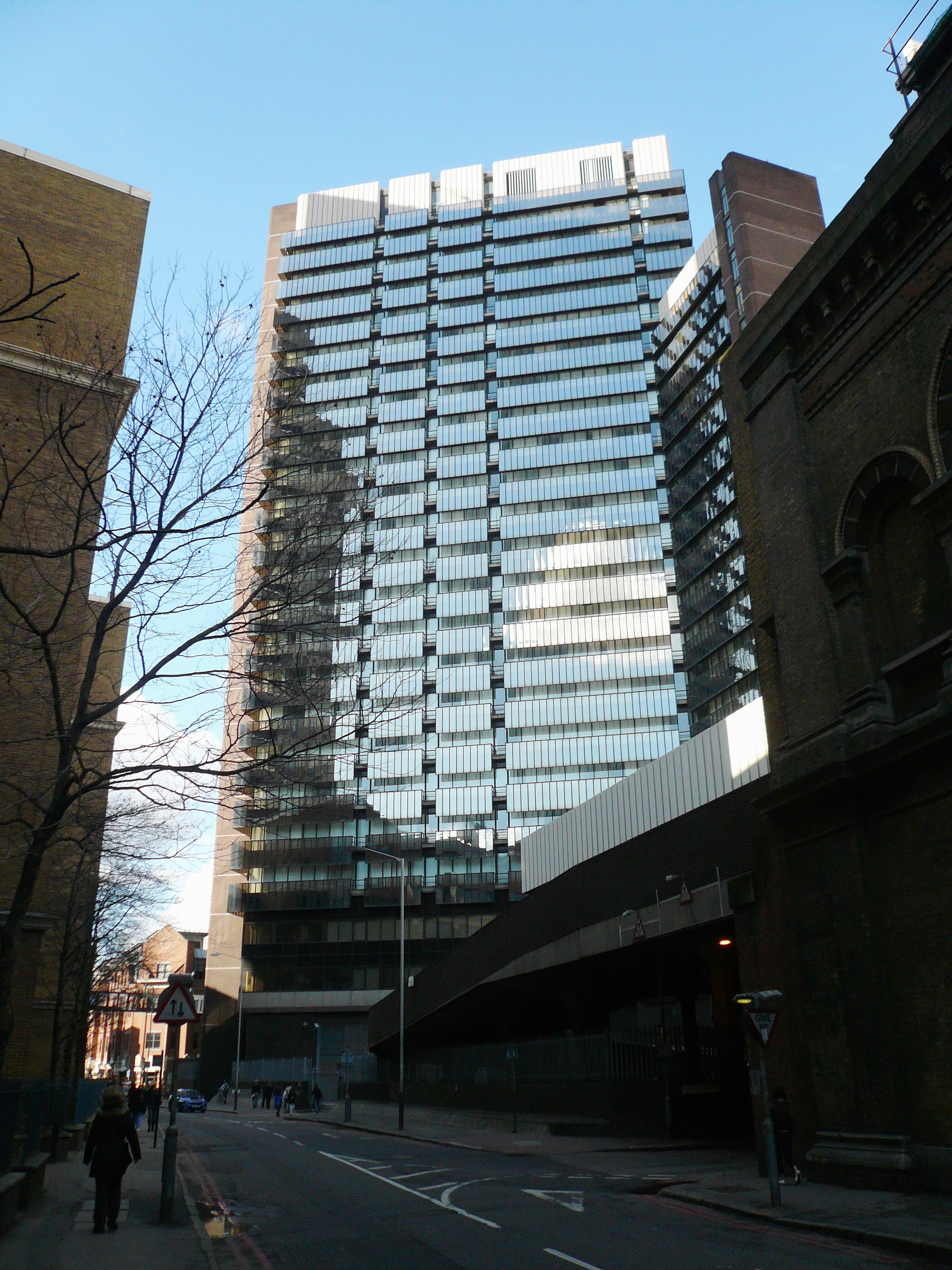
The Southwark Towers office block, which was demolished in 2008 to make space for The Shard

Sellar and his original partners CLS Holdings plc and CN Ltd (acting for the Halabi Family Trust) secured an interim funding package of £196 million in September 2006 from the Nationwide Building Society and Kaupthing Singer & Friedlander. This enabled them to pay off the costs already incurred and to buy out the Southwark Towers occupational lease from the building's tenants, PricewaterhouseCoopers. Vacant possession of the site was secured a year later, after PricewaterhouseCoopers completed their operational relocation.

In September 2007, preparations for the demolition of Southwark Towers began. However, later that same month, turbulence in the financial markets was reported as jeopardising put the Shard's construction, potentially reinforcing the hypothesised Skyscraper Index.

In November 2007, building contractor Mace was awarded the contract to build the Shard for a fixed price of no more than £350 million. However, this price increased to almost £435 million in October 2008.

In April 2008, demolition of Southwark Towers was visibly under way, and by October, with demolition completed in early 2009. Site preparation began soon after for The Shard.

=== Funding ===
Towards the end of 2007, the gathering uncertainty in the global financial markets sparked concerns about the viability of the Shard. However, in January 2008, Sellar announced that it had secured funding from a consortium of Qatari investors, who had paid £150 million to secure an 80% stake in the project. The consortium included Qatar National Bank, QInvest, Qatari Islamic Bank and the Qatari property developer Barwa Real Estate, as well as Sellar Property. The deal involved a buyout of the Halabi and CLS Holdings stakes, and part of the Sellar Property stake. The new owners promised to provide the first tranche of finance, allowing construction of the tower to begin. In 2009, the State of Qatar consolidated its ownership of London Bridge Quarter (known now as Shard Quarter), including The Shard, through the purchase of the private Qatari investors' stakes. Shard Quarter is currently jointly owned by the State of Qatar and Sellar Property Group.

== Architecture ==
Audio description of the building by Steven Berkoff

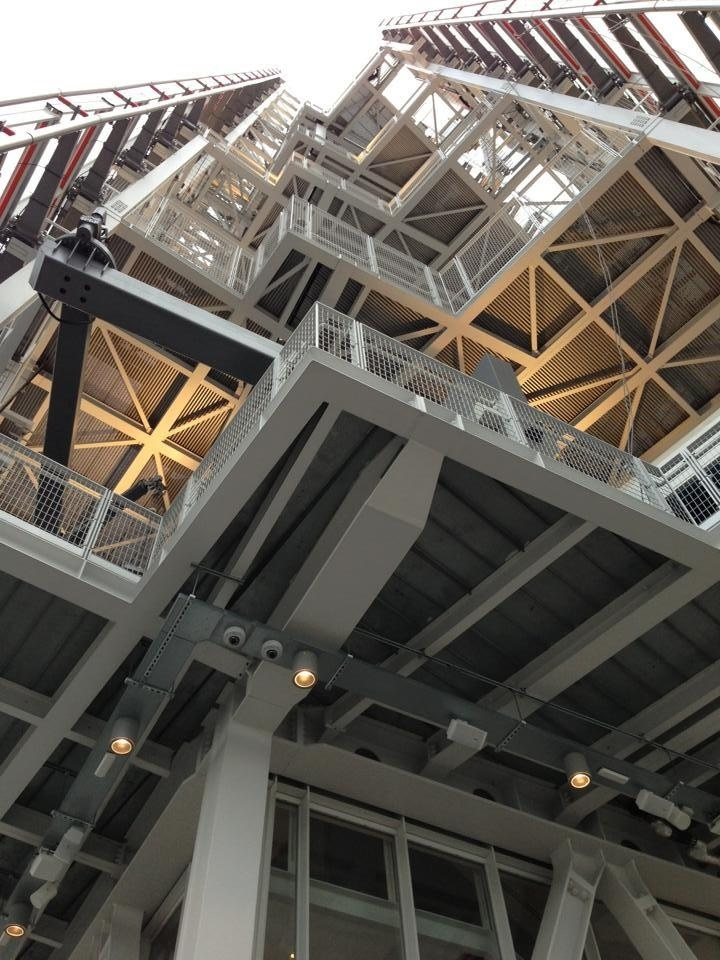
Internal structure of the Shard's spire and radiator floors, seen from the 72nd-floor observatory

Renzo Piano, the project's architect, designed The Shard as a spire-like sculpture emerging from the River Thames. He was inspired by the railway lines next to the site, the London spires depicted by the 18th-century Venetian painter Canaletto, and the masts of sailing ships. Piano's design met criticism from English Heritage, who claimed the building would be "a shard of glass through the heart of historic London", giving the building its name, The Shard. Piano considered the slender, spire-like form of the tower a positive addition to the London skyline, recalling the church steeples featured in historic engravings of the city, and believed that its presence would be far more delicate than opponents of the project alleged. He proposed a sophisticated use of glazing, with expressive façades of angled glass panes intended to reflect sunlight and the sky above, so that the appearance of the building would change according to the weather and seasons. The building features 11,000 panes of glass, with a total surface area of 602,779 square feet (56,000.0 m^{2}) equivalent to the area of almost eight Wembley football pitches.

The Shard was designed with energy efficiency in mind. It is fitted with a combined heat and power (CHP) plant, operating on natural gas from the National Grid. Fuel is efficiently converted to electricity, and heat is recovered from the engine to provide hot water for the building.

Following the destruction of New York's World Trade Center (WTC) in the terror attacks of 11 September 2001, architects and structural engineers worldwide began re-evaluating the design of tall structures. The Shard's early conceptual designs were among the first in the UK to be amended following the publication of the US National Institute of Standards and Technology (NIST) report into the collapse of the WTC. The building is designed to maintain its stability under very onerous conditions, with its post-tensioned concrete and composite floors, load-bearing pillars, and tapering shape giving it a sway tolerance of 400 millimetres (16 in).

In 2014, The Shard claimed first place at the Emporis Skyscraper Awards, recognising buildings over 100 m (328 ft) completed in the previous 12 months. The Emporis judges hailed the building as "a skyscraper that is recognized immediately and which is already considered London's new emblem".

=== Layout ===
Floors	Space designation
73–95	Spire
68–72	The View from The Shard (observatory)
66-67	Ventrue Spaces
53–65	Residences
34–52	Shangri-La Hotel
33	Hutong
32	Oblix
31	Aqua Shard
28	South Hook Gas / Jellyfish
27	Arma Partners / Campari Group
26	CoStar Group
24–25	The Office Group
23	Foresight Group
22	Jellyfish
20–21	Kraft Heinz
19	Medical Protection Society
18	Gallup / Foresight Group
17	Warwick Business School / Sage Group
16	Al Jazeera Media Network
15	Mathys & Squire / Arcapita / Xio Partners / Fulcrum Chambers
14	Duff & Phelps
13	Warwick Business School / Duff & Phelps / Sage Group
12	Mitie
11	Cognism / Rider Levett Bucknall
10	Real Estate Management (UK) Limited / Robert Half / Protiviti
9	Merit Group / Sapphire Systems / Siteimprove
8	Greenberg Traurig
7	Matches Fashion
4–6	Clinic (HCA Healthcare at the Shard)
3	Shard Quarter Management Suite
2	Office Reception
Ground	Hotel, restaurant and observatory entrances

== Construction ==
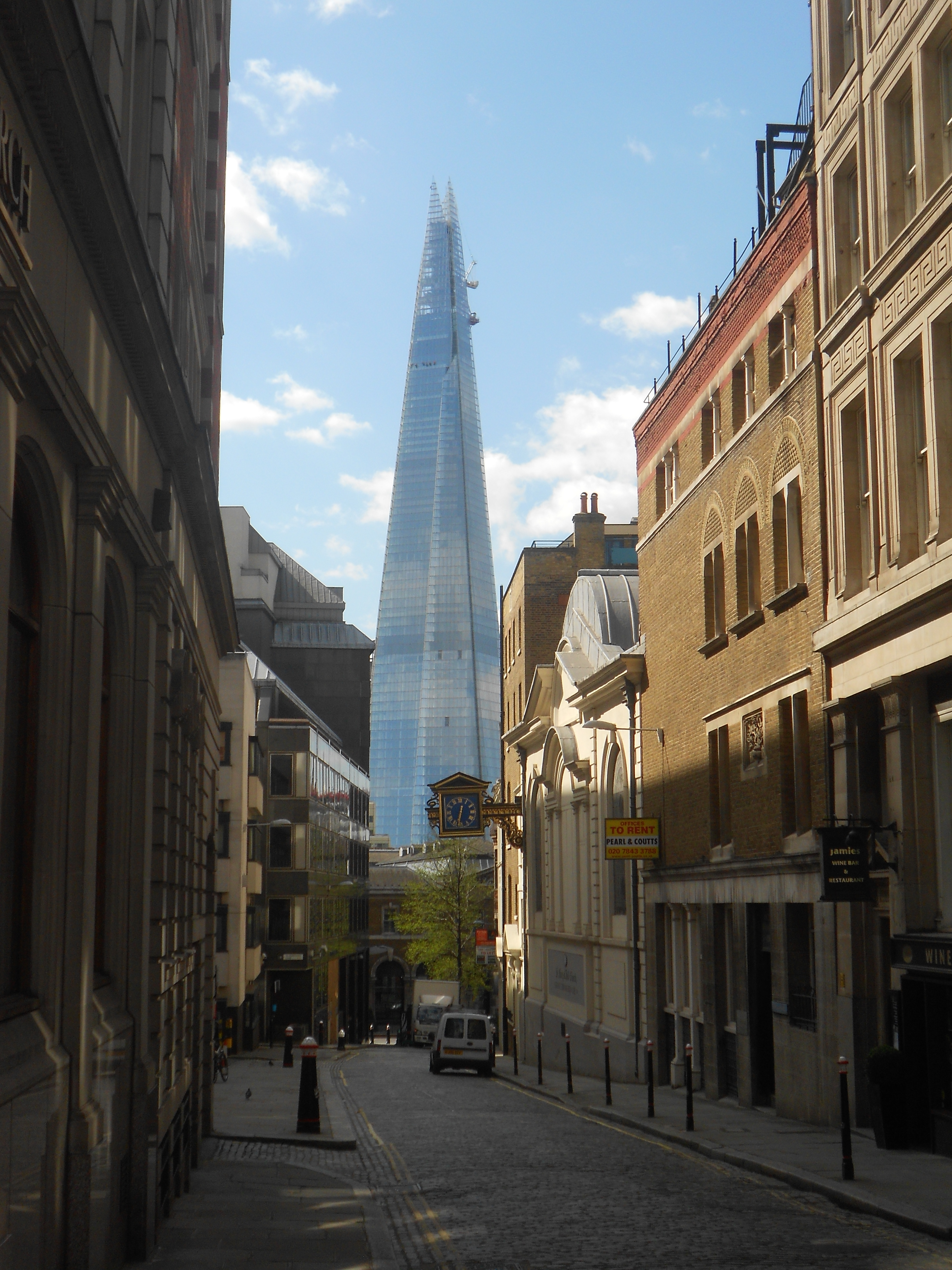
The Shard pictured from Great Tower Street in April 2012

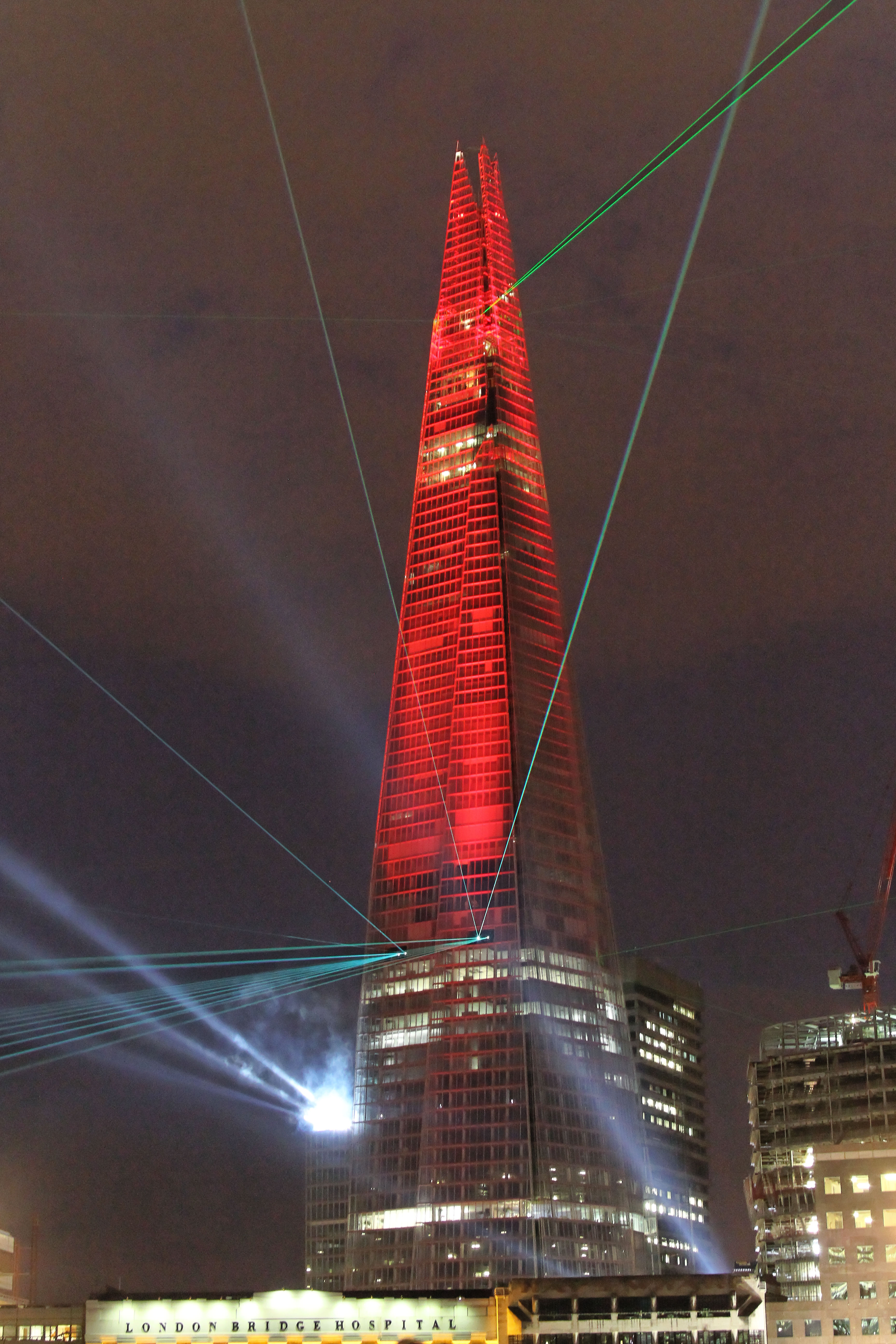
The inauguration of The Shard on 5 July 2012

For the construction of the skyscraper some path-breaking engineering methods were used, such as top-down construction, where foundations are dug while the core is built up – this was a first for the UK. In February 2009, a mobile crane and a small piling rig arrived on site. In early March 2009, the crane began putting steel beams into the ground, as part of preparations for the core of the building. Full construction began on 16 March 2009. Demolition work on New London Bridge House started in May 2009, as part of the concurrent London Bridge Place project. The first steelwork went into The Shard's piles on 28 April. Five cranes were used to build The Shard, with four of them 'jumping' with the tower as it rose. Crane 1 was erected in September 2009 and Crane 2 was erected at the beginning of October. By 20 October 2009, steel beams had begun appearing on site, with concrete being poured at the northern part of the site, ready for Crane 3.

By March 2010, the concrete core was rising steadily at about 3 m (10 ft) a day. After a pause in March–April 2010, it continued rising, reaching the 33rd floor in mid-June, almost level with the top of Guy's Hospital, which stands at 143 m (469 ft). On 27 July 2010, the core stopped rising, having reached the 38th floor, and was reconfigured for further construction. By mid-November 2010, the core had reached the 68th floor, with the tower's steel reaching the 40th floor and glass cladding enveloping a third of the building. In late November, the core's height exceeded 235 m (771 ft), ending One Canada Square's 18-year reign as Britain's tallest building.

The Shard's concrete core topped out at the 72nd floor in early 2011, standing at 244 m (801 ft). The early part of January 2011 saw the installation of hydraulic screens, which were used to form the concrete floors of the hotel and apartment section of the tower, and rose with the floors up to the 69th floor. On 25 January 2011, the concrete pumps began pouring the first concrete floor at the 41st floor. By the end of February 2011, concrete flooring had risen to the 46th floor, with a new floor being poured on average every week. The cladding of the structure also progressed, mainly on the tower's "backpack". During this phase of construction, a fox was discovered living at the top of the unfinished skyscraper. The fox, named Romeo by staff, is thought to have entered the building through the central stairwell. It survived by eating scraps of food left by builders working on the incomplete structure. The fox was captured and taken to Riverside Animal Centre in Wallington.

August 2011 saw steady progress in construction, with cladding enveloping more than half the building's exterior. Pouring of the concrete floors reached the 67th floor, and progression on the tower's cladding reached the 58th floor. By mid-August, the core box had been removed. By 19 September 2011, the tower's steel was approaching the height of the completed core, reaching almost 244 m (801 ft). On 24 September, a final crane – at the time, the tallest ever built in Britain – was erected to install the skyscraper's upper spire. Mace and structural steel contractors Severfield test assembled the Shard's spire on Dalton Airfield in North Yorkshire before breaking it down again for transport to London. By late December 2011, The Shard had become the tallest building in the European Union, superseding the Commerzbank Tower in Frankfurt, Germany.

The Shard's steel structure was topped out on 30 March 2012, when its 66-metre (217 ft), 500-tonne spire was winched into place. The steel structure thus reached a height of 308.7 m (1,013 ft). The final 516 panes of glass were added shortly after, topping the tower out at its full height of 309.6 m (1,016 ft).

The Shard was inaugurated on 5 July 2012 by the Prime Minister of Qatar, Hamad bin Jassim bin Jaber Al Thani, in a ceremony attended by the then Prince Andrew, Duke of York in time for the 2012 Summer Olympics. Practical completion of the building was achieved in November 2012.

=== Gallery ===
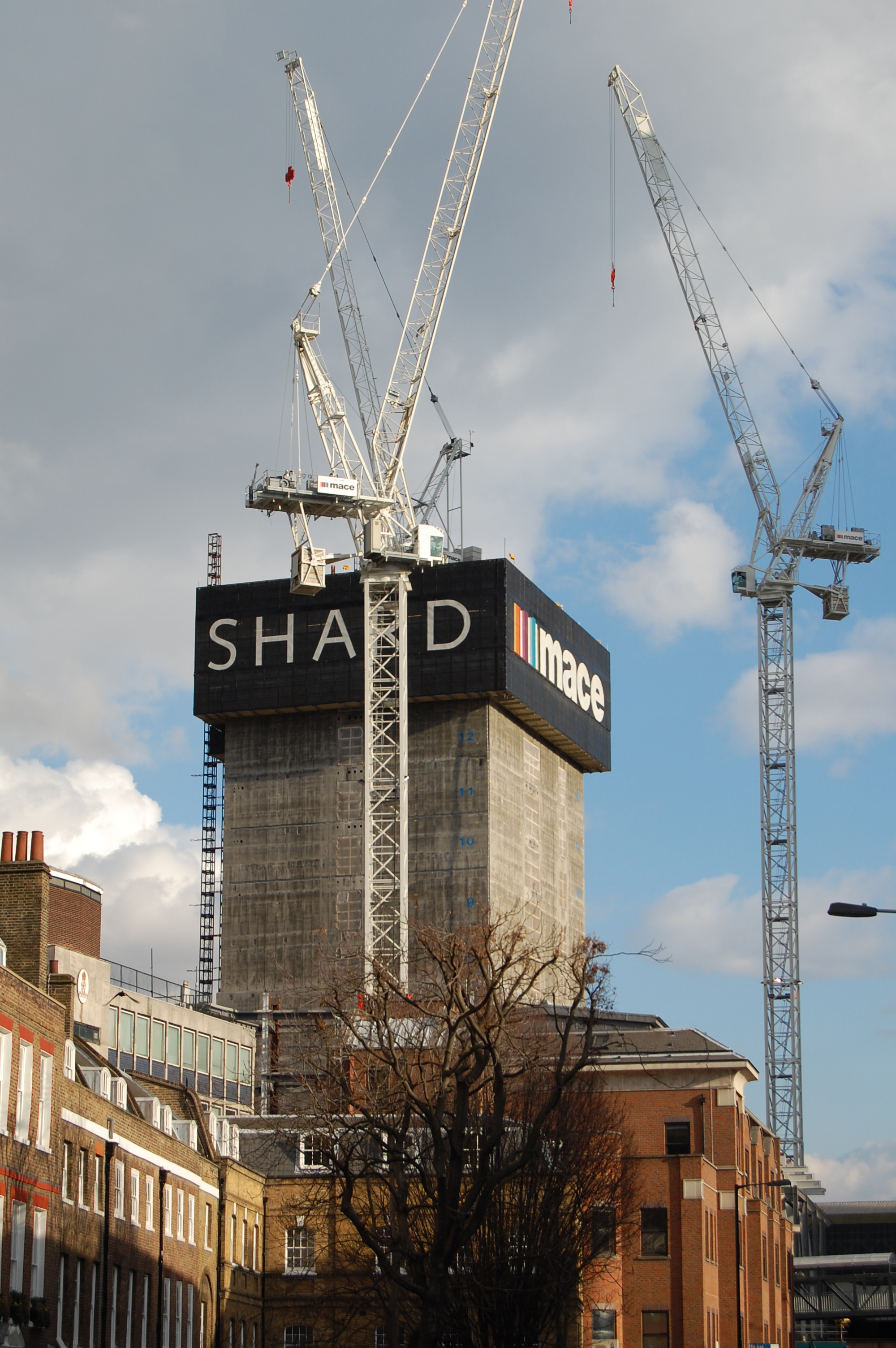
February 2010

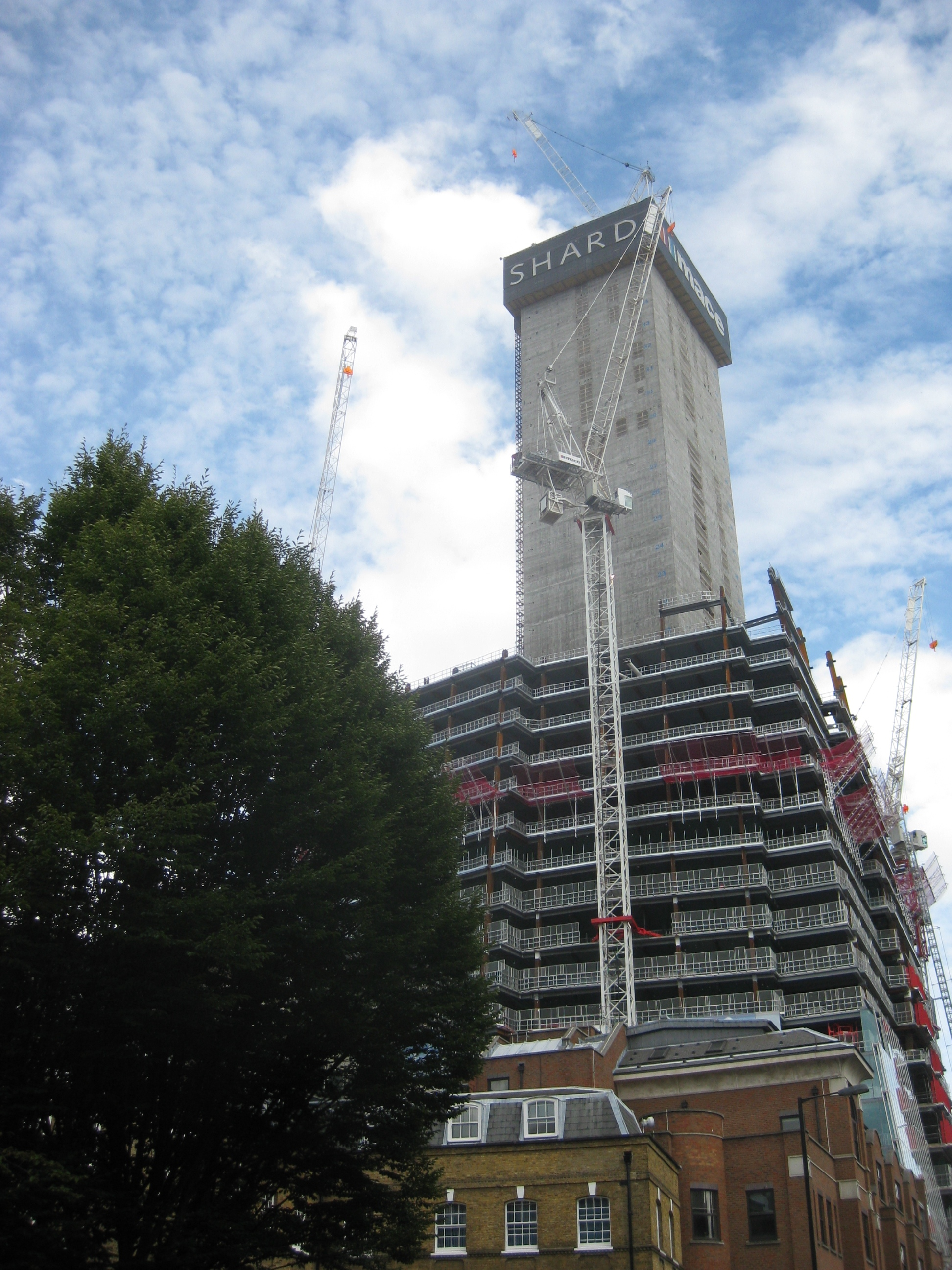
July 2010

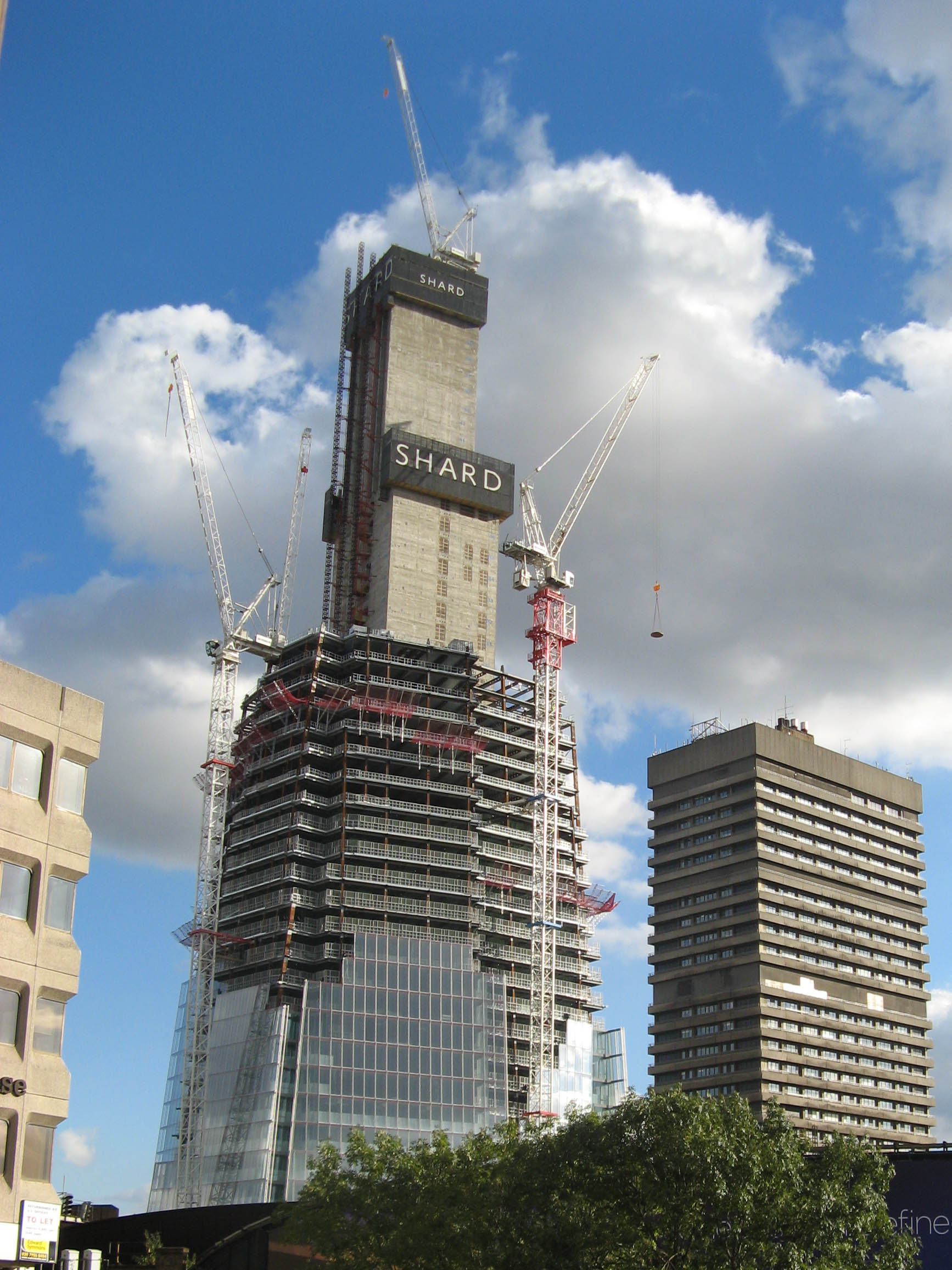
September 2010

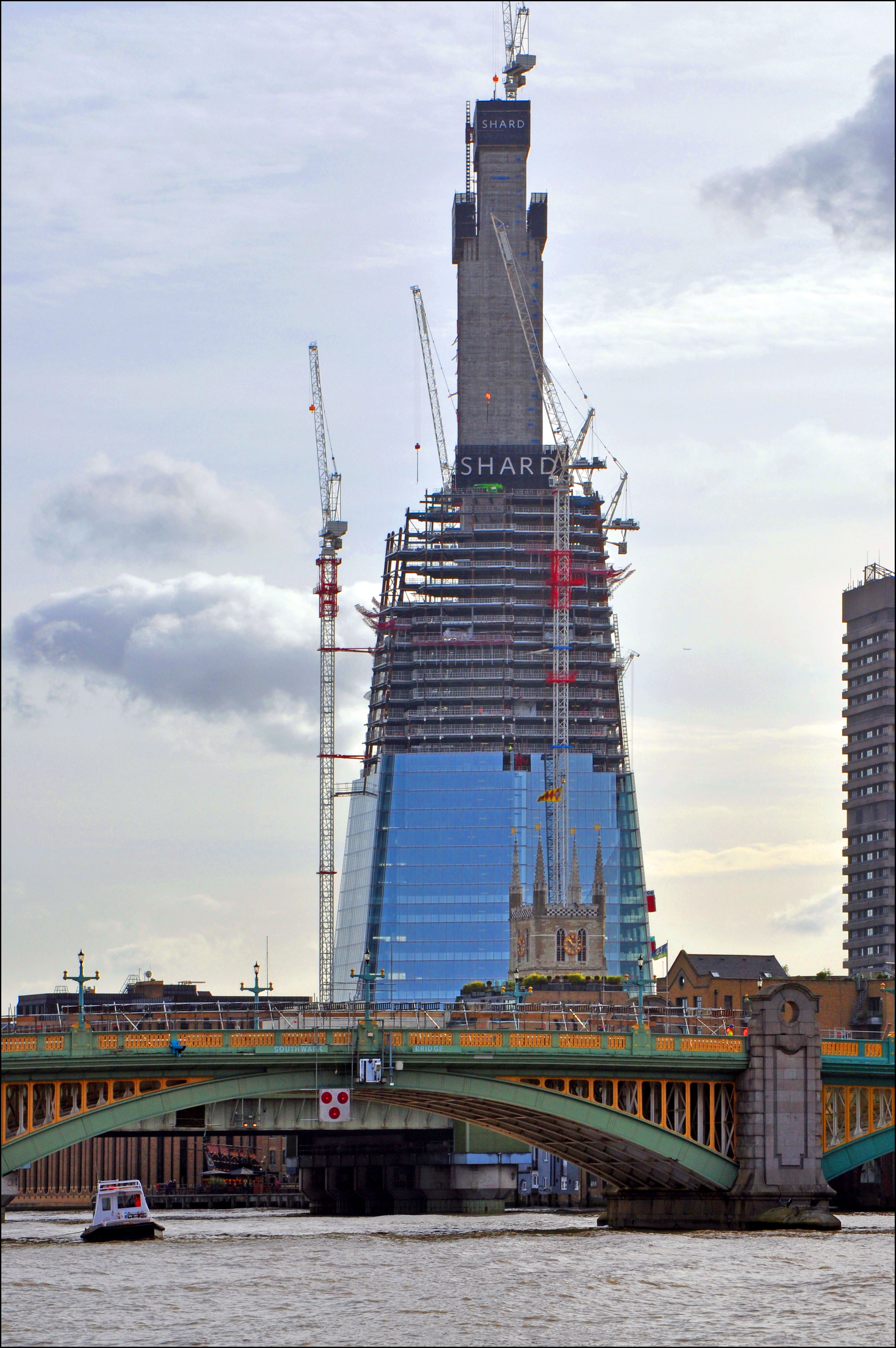
November 2010

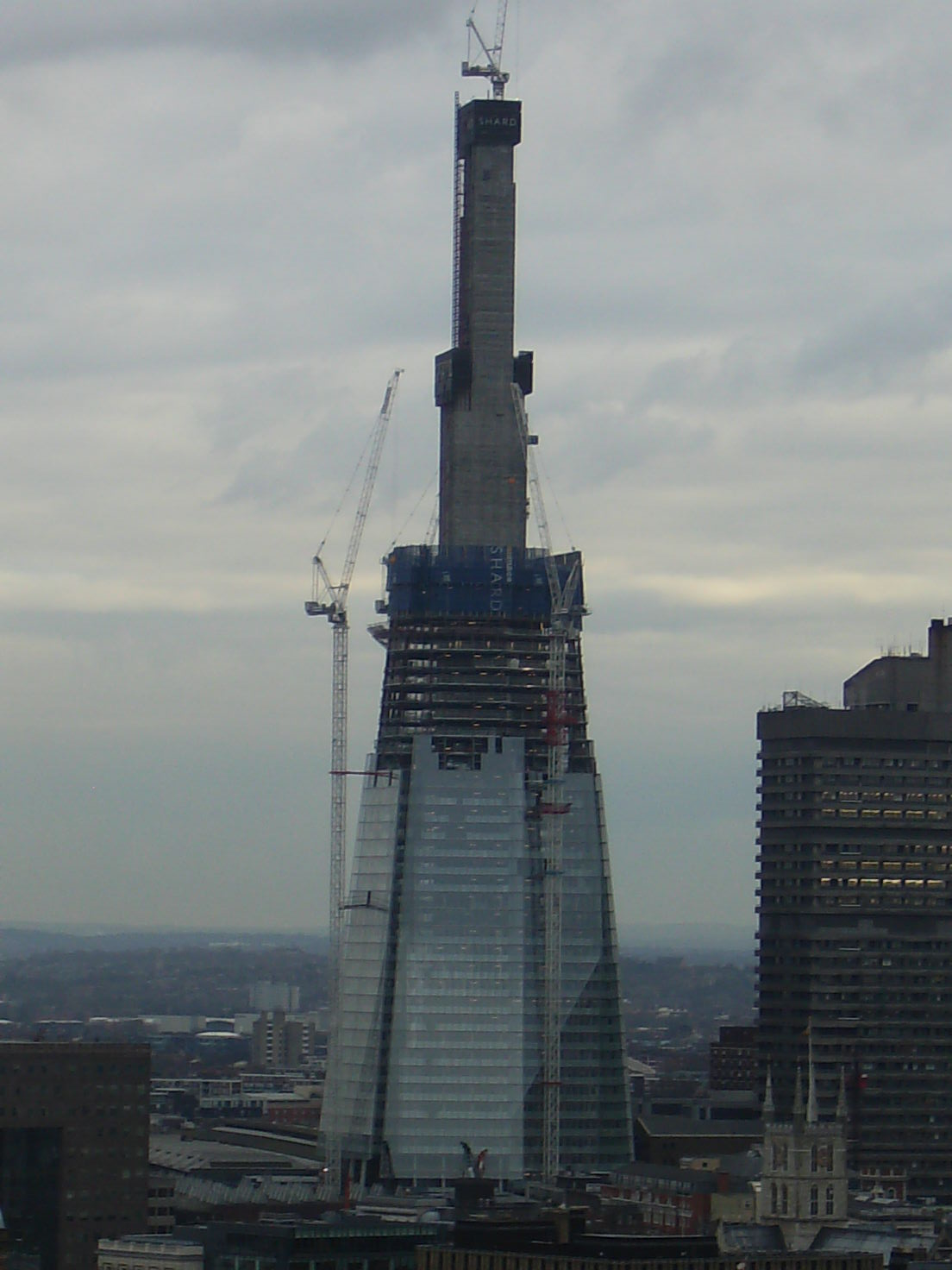
January 2011

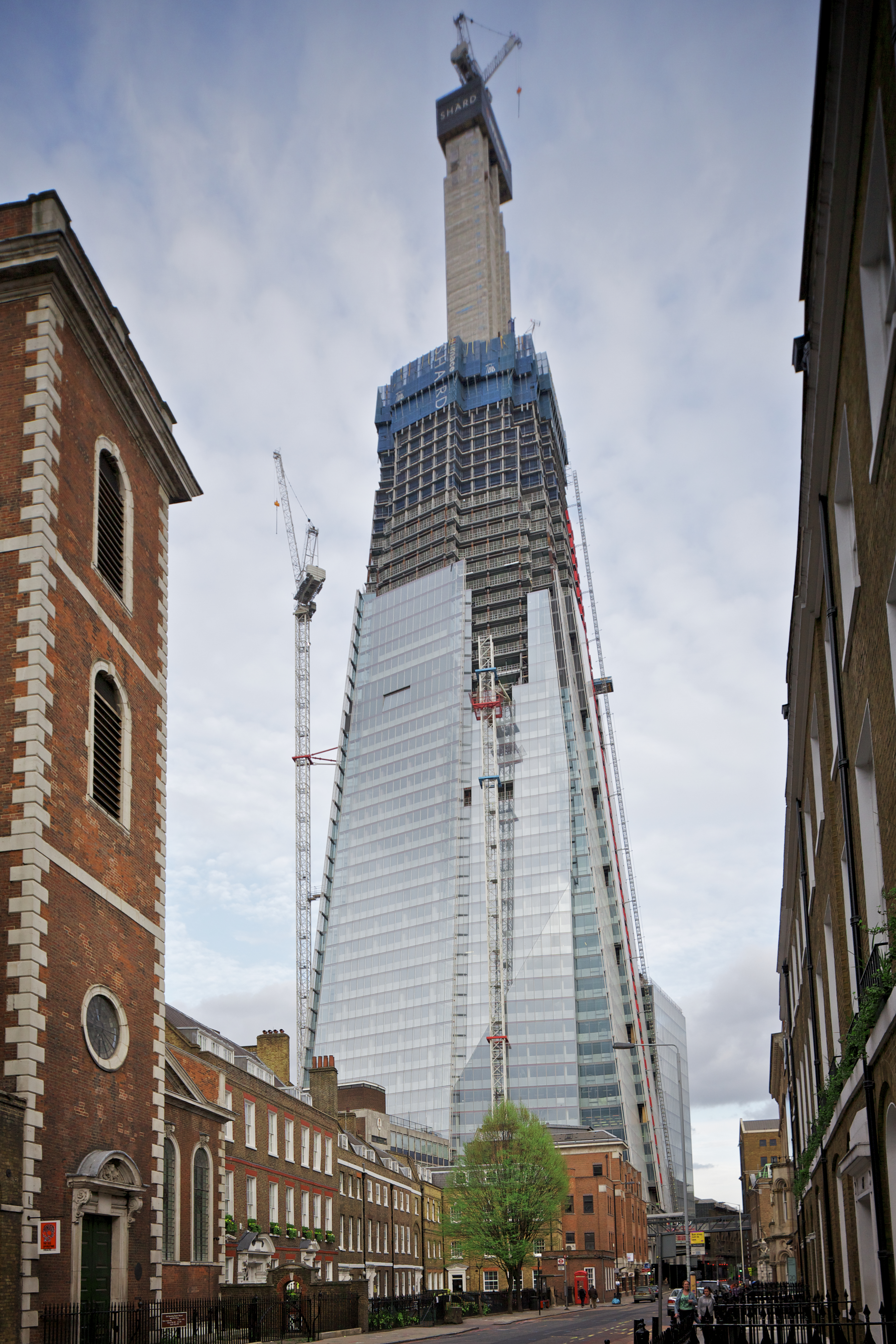
April 2011

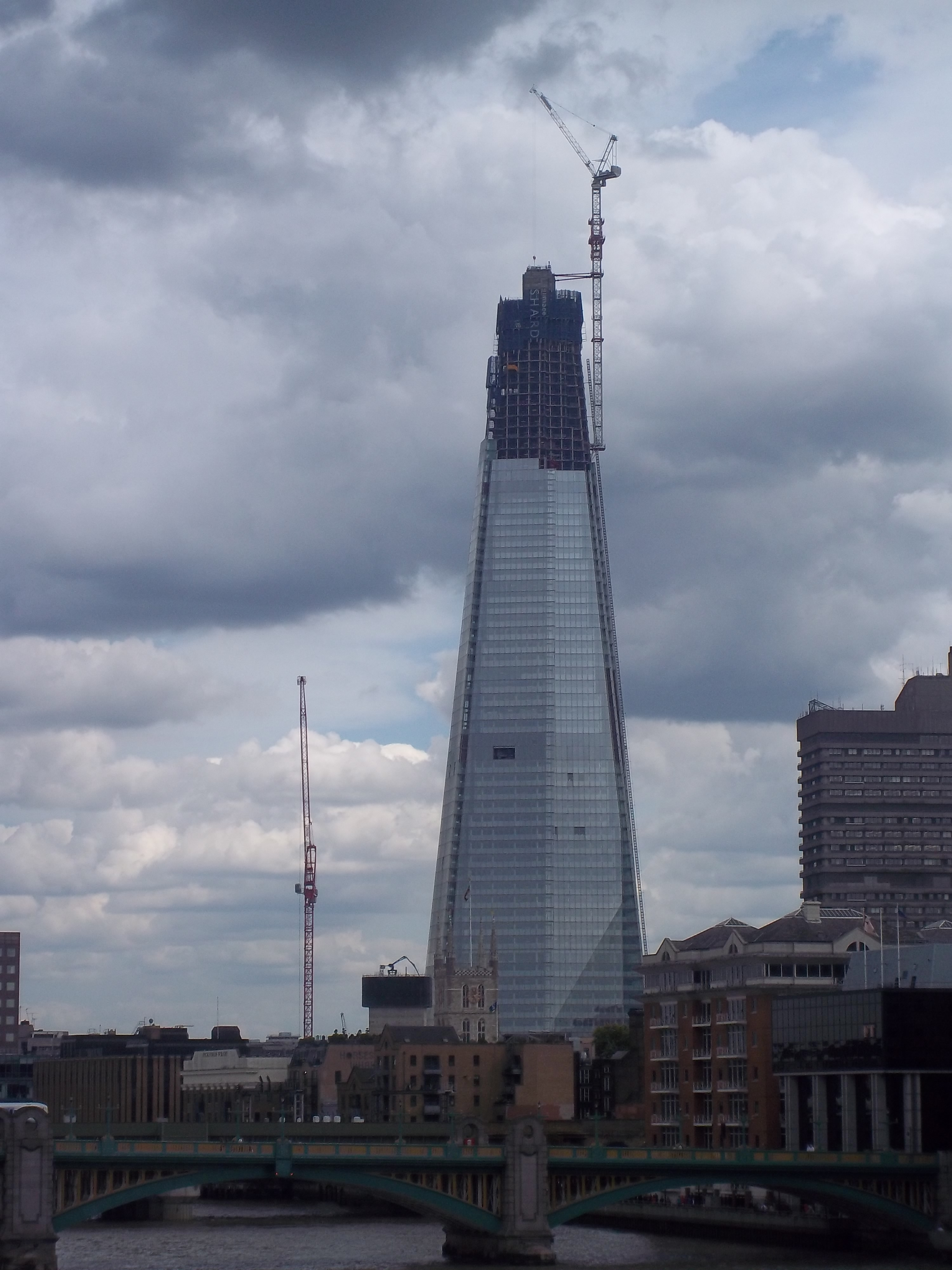
August 2011

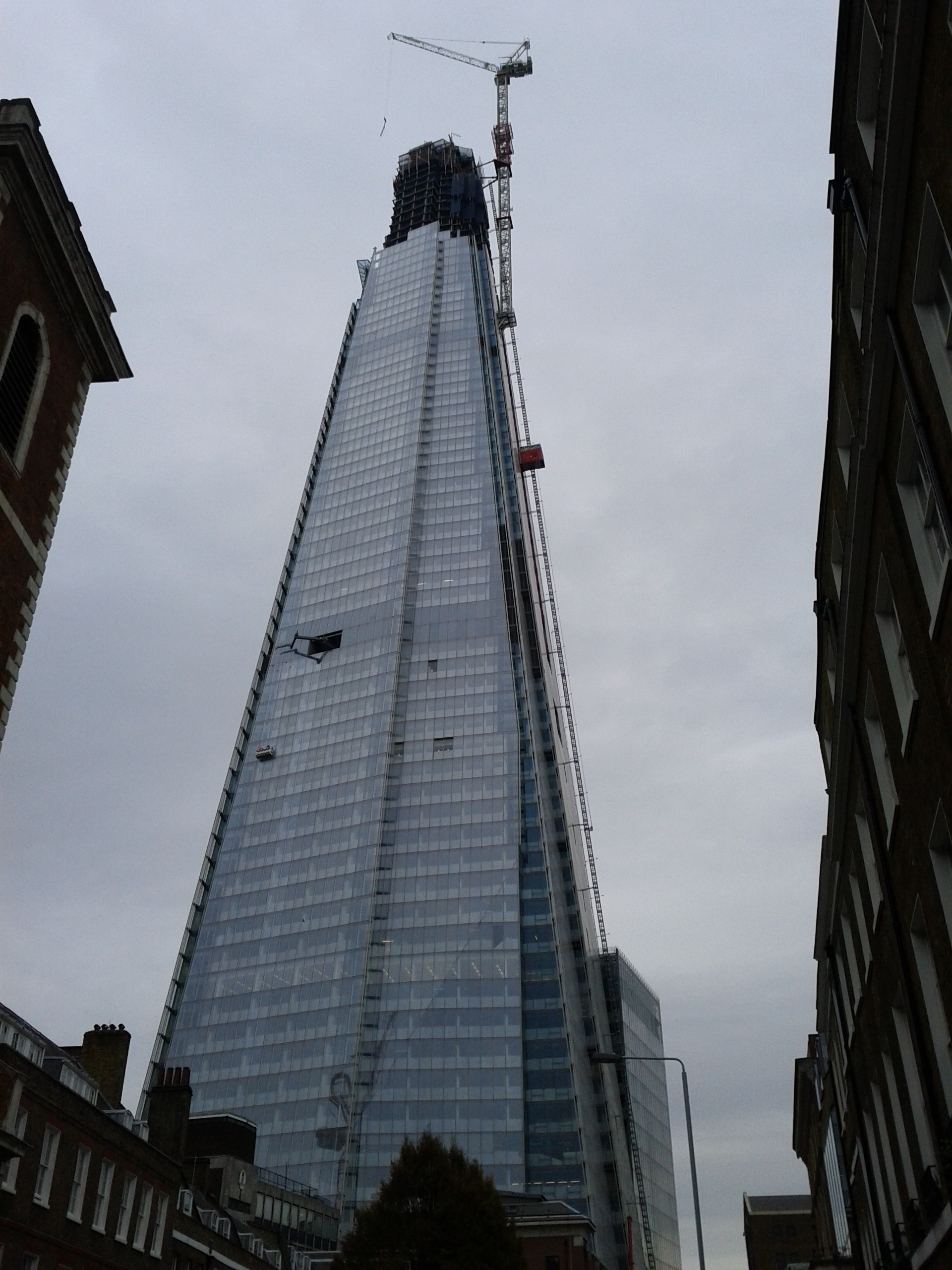
October 2011

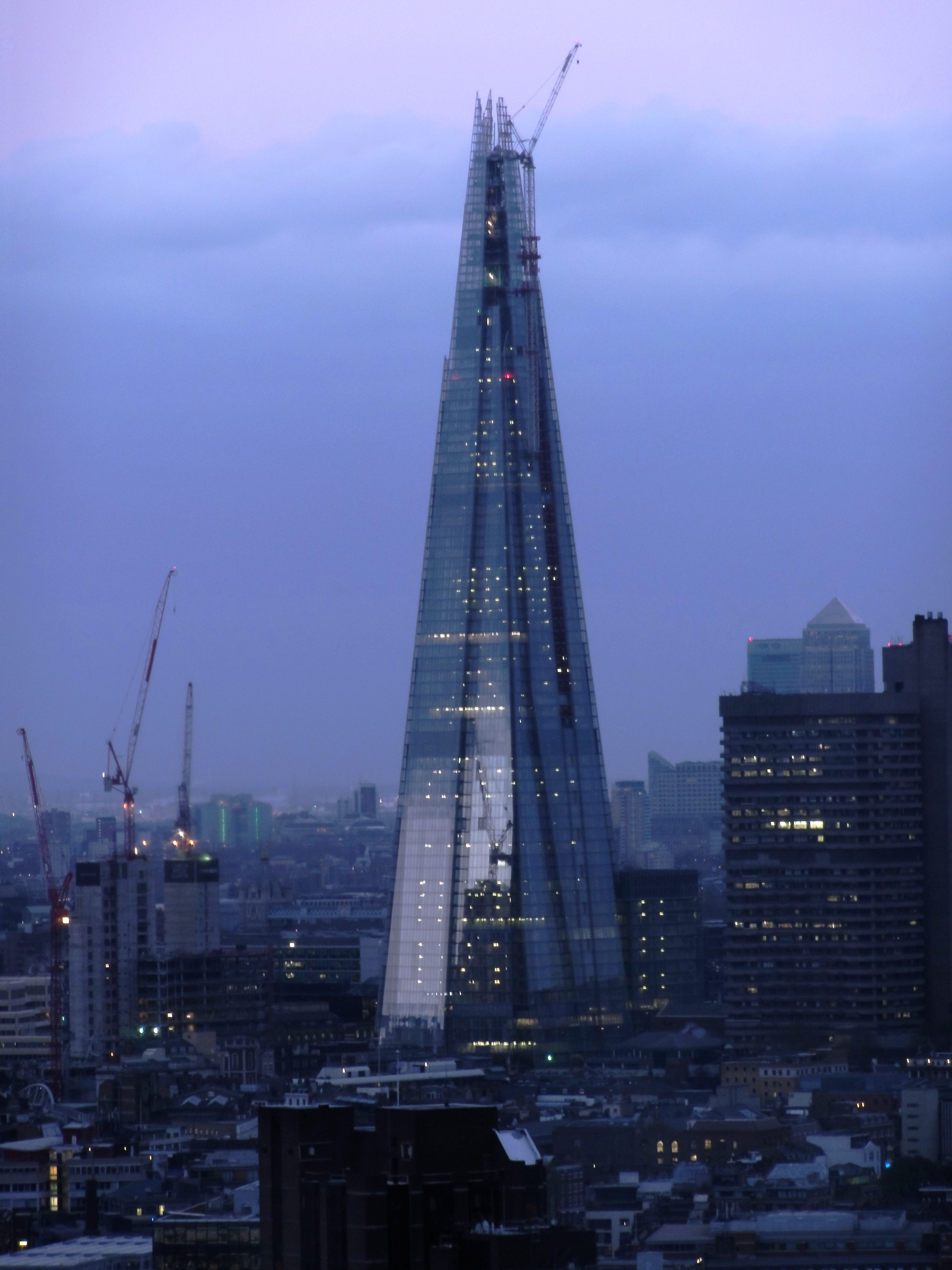
April 2012

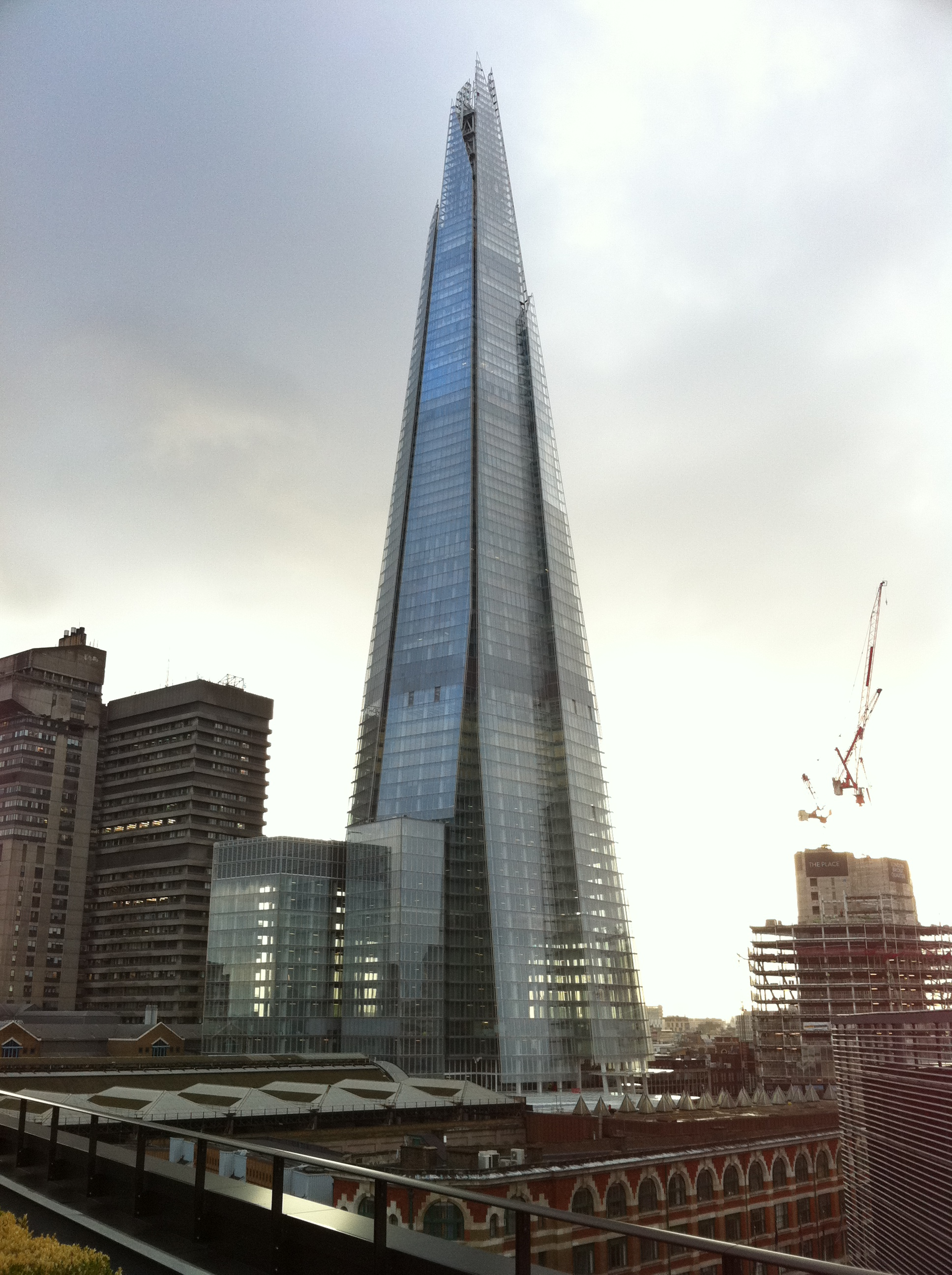
May 2012

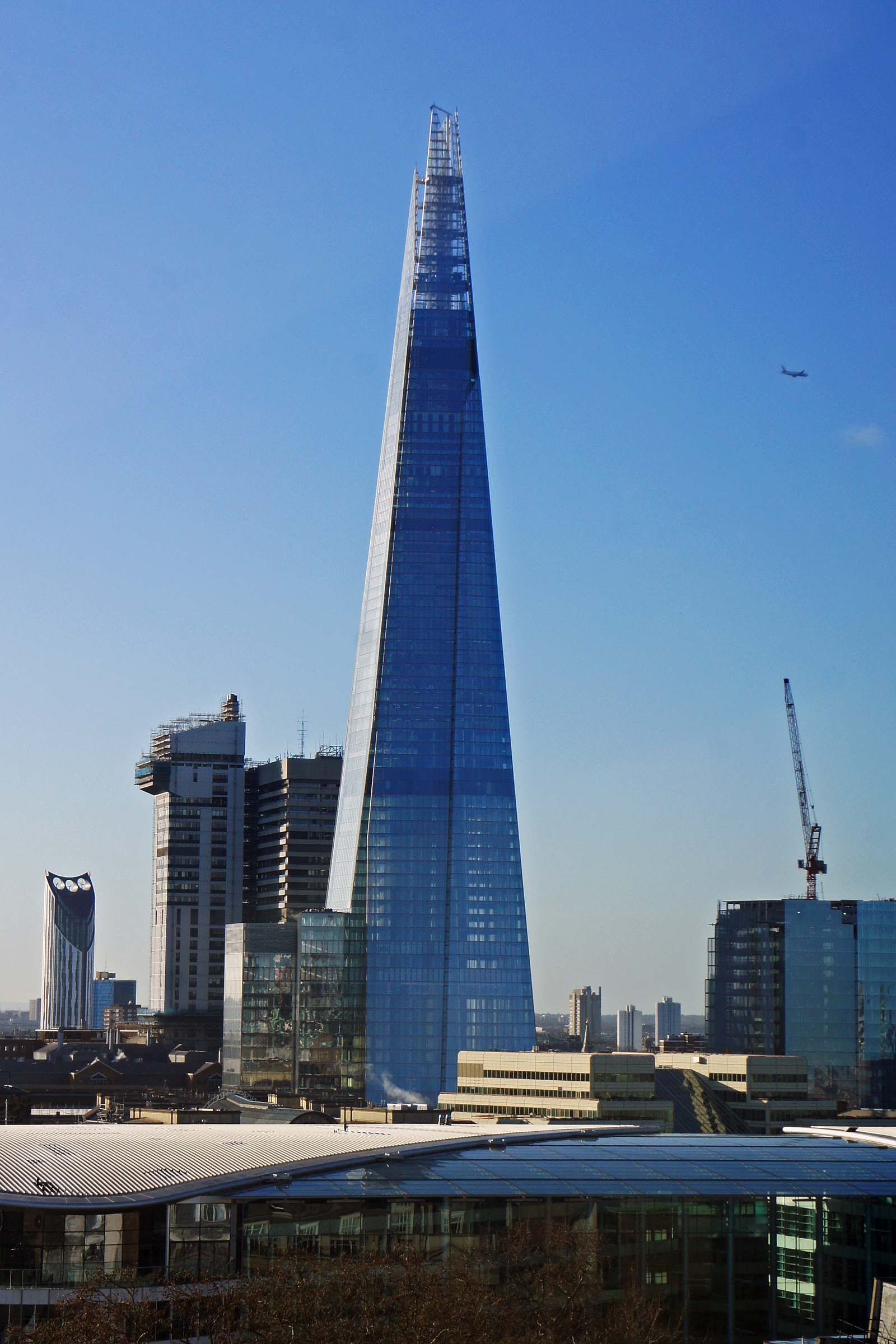
January 2013

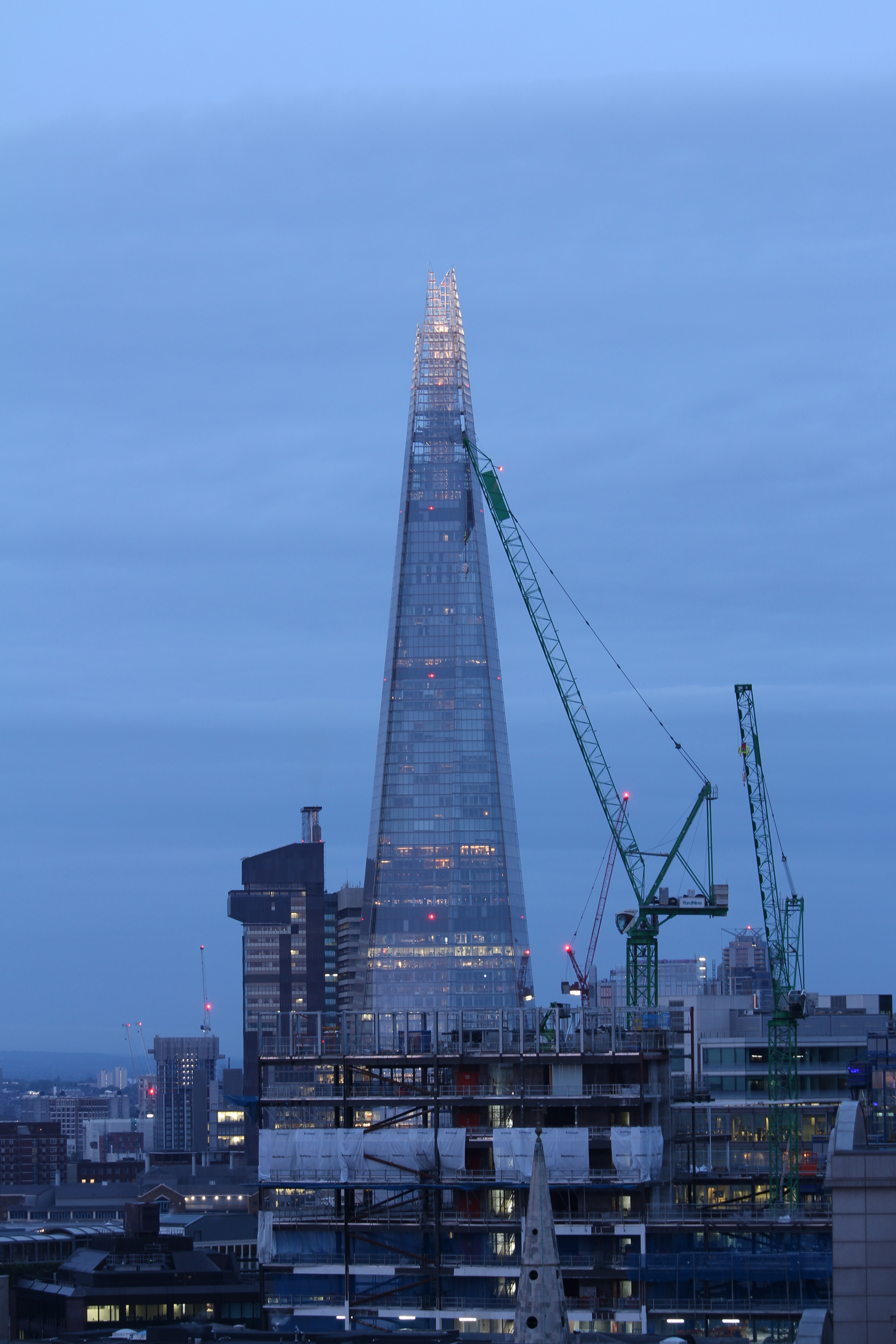
August 2013 (Completion)
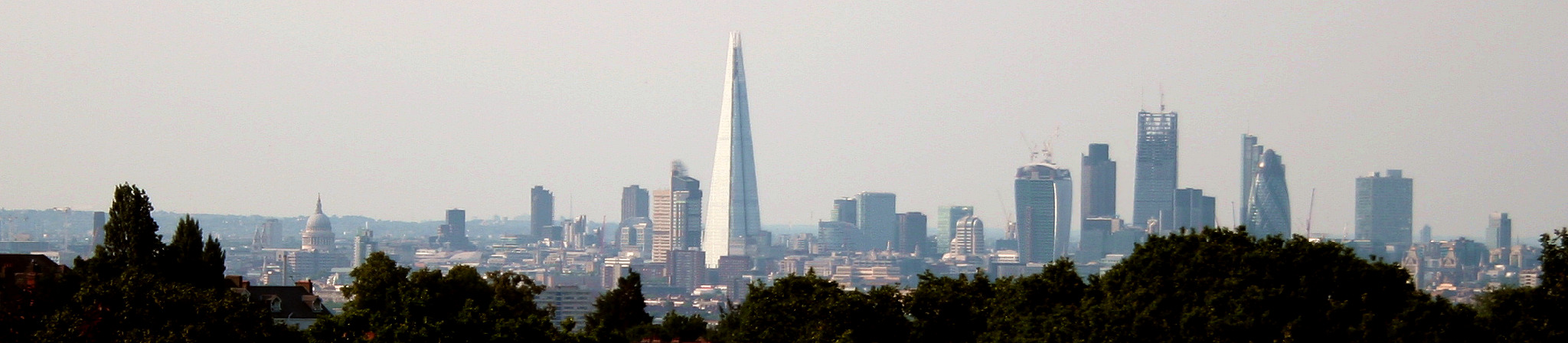
The Shard dominating the City of London skyline, as seen from Forest Hill in July 2013
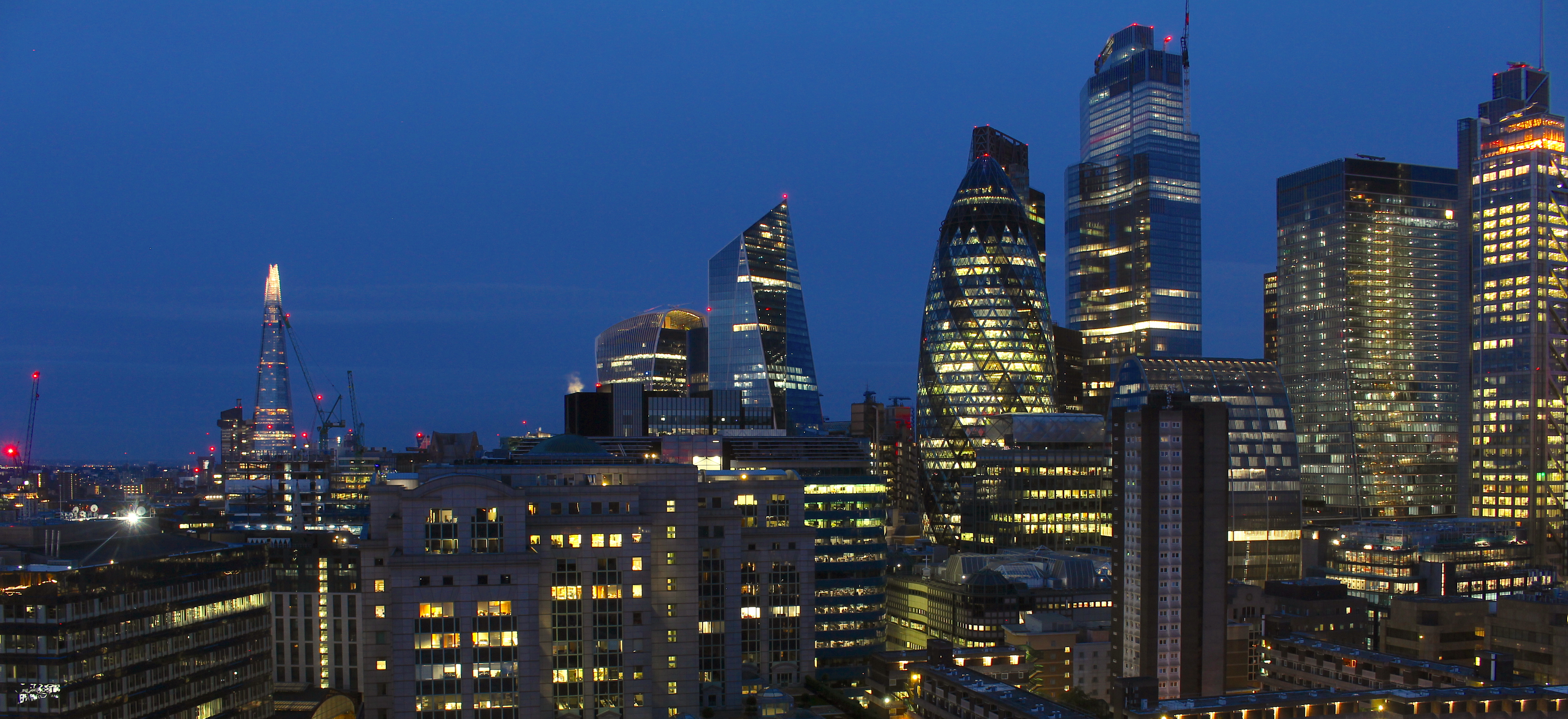
The Shard as part of the London City skyline. The Gherkin is on the right.

== Height ==
Standing 309.6 metres (1,016 ft) at its highest point, and 308.5 metres (1,012 ft) at the highest point of its steelwork, The Shard became the tallest building in the European Union in December 2011, and the tallest completed building in Europe on 30 March 2012. It is taller than Frankfurt's Commerzbank Tower at 259 m (850 ft) the record holder between 1997 and 2005 and three later skyscrapers of Moscow: the Triumph-Palace, Naberezhnaya Tower, and City of Capitals. These three had each held the title for roughly 2 1/2 years. The Shard was overtaken by a fourth such tower in November 2012: the 339-metre (1,112 ft) Mercury City Tower.

The Shard is the second-tallest free-standing structure in the United Kingdom, after the 330-metre (1,083 ft) concrete transmission tower at Emley Moor. Another planned London skyscraper, the Pinnacle (now replaced by 22 Bishopsgate), was originally proposed to rival the height of The Shard, but was reduced to a height of 287.9 metres (945 ft) because of concerns from the Civil Aviation Authority. It is taller than all of the natural peaks in London and in adjoining counties, the highest of which is Walbury Hill, close to Wiltshire. Walbury Hill is the furthest natural point visible from the top

== Initial tenants ==
The Shard comprises a 26-floor office complex, occupied by 32 companies across 10 business sectors, three restaurants—Aqua Shard, Oblix, and Hutong—the five-star Shangri-La The Shard, London hotel, 10 residential apartments, and the UK's highest viewing gallery, The View from The Shard.

In February 2013, The Sunday Times reported that the developers of The Shard were in negotiations to secure the first tenants of the building's 26 floors of office space. At the time, potential tenants included financial restructuring specialists Duff & Phelps, private equity firm Hatton Corporation, and the South Hook Liquefied Natural Gas Company.

The Shard's fourth, fifth, and sixth floors host the HCA (Hospital Corporations of America), part of London Bridge Hospital. The Shard's 31st, 32nd, and 33rd floors host three restaurants: Oblix, Hutong, and Aqua Shard. The building's Shangri-La Hotel occupies floors 34–52. The hotel was initially expected to open by the end of 2013, but its opening was ultimately delayed to 6 May 2014. In March 2014, Mathys & Squire became the first law firm to take tenancy in the building. In May 2014, the Foresight Group, an investment firm, moved its head UK office into The Shard on the 17th floor. In June 2015, Warwick Business School opened its new base in The Shard, occupying the same floor and was officially opened by the mayor of London, Boris Johnson. It houses a 100-seat lecture theatre and a smaller one at 60 seats, plus 8 seminar rooms and an IT lab, offering postgraduate and executive education.

In July 2013, the Qatari broadcaster Al Jazeera Media Network announced that it would open a new television studio and newsroom for Al Jazeera English in The Shard. Al Jazeera moved in on 13 September 2014; its first live broadcast from the building was on 10 November 2014. The facility currently houses all primary operations for Al Jazeera Media Network's channels in London; it is capable of running an entire channel independent from Al Jazeera's other hubs, and is the network's second-biggest hub after its facility in Doha, Qatar.

In January 2015, further tenants for The Shard were announced, including IO Oil & Gas Consulting, Gallup, and The Office Group. In May 2015, the American recruitment consultancy Robert Half International announced that it would move several branches of its business into The Shard, having purchased 20,000 square feet (1,900 m^{2}) of floor space on the tower's tenth floor. In August 2015, the international law firm Greenberg Traurig announced that it would open its offices on the eighth floor of The Shard by the end of the year.

Matches Fashion took over 35,000 sq ft in January 2016, and six months later expanded its headquarter's presence in The Shard by 40%. In March 2016, marketing agency Jellyfish signed a lease for 9,017 square feet (837.7 m^{2}) of office space on the 22nd floor, with occupancy beginning later in the year. A month later, publishing house Dods Group let almost 17,000 square feet (1,600 m^{2}) on Level 11, becoming The Shard's 28th office occupier. In December, Kraft Heinz relocated their European and UK headquarters from Hayes in Hillingdon to The Shard after taking 38,000 square feet (3,500 m^{2}) on Levels 20 & 21.

The Shard offices were announced as fully let in October 2017, following lettings to Mitie and existing occupiers, Foresight Group, and Warwick Business School.

== Urban exploration, BASE jumping, and climbing ==
In December 2011, a group of recreational explorers calling themselves the Place Hackers evaded security and made their way to the top of the Shard building site, climbing one of the tallest cranes in the process. They later posted photographs of the London skyline taken from the top of the Shard on the Internet and received wide media attention. One member of the group, Oxford University researcher Bradley Garrett, later revealed to various news outlets that over 20 urban explorers had made their way to the top of the building during its construction. In a 2012 article for Domus magazine, Garrett wrote that "the conceptual barrier to places in our cities is brought about by a process of engineered exclusion" and that the explorers were "cultivating the creative city that money can't buy".

BASE jumpers reportedly jumped from The Shard over ten times between 2009 and 2012. Four jumps were reportedly made by Dan Witchalls, who had filmed one attempt. The highest jump was said to have been from a height of 260 metres (850 ft). In March 2016 another person BASE jumped from The Shard.

On 3 September 2012, a team of 40 people, including then-Prince Andrew, abseiled from the tower's 87th floor. This feat was performed to raise money for the Outward Bound Trust and the Royal Marines Charitable Trust Fund. In November 2012, the French urban climber Alain Robert was spotted in the building by security guards. At the end of the month, the Shard's owners won an injunction to prevent him from entering or climbing the building.

On 11 July 2013, six Greenpeace volunteers climbed the Shard and unfurled a flag in protest against Arctic oil drilling by Royal Dutch Shell. The protestors announced they were "experienced climbers", but medical personnel were summoned to the base of the tower nonetheless. The Shard's staff closed the tower's observatory and gave them a safety briefing and other advice during their climb. After completing their 16-hour climb, the protestors were arrested by police on suspicion of aggravated trespass.

On 8 July 2019, a twenty-year-old from Oxford, George King-Thompson, climbed the Shard without ropes. He later received a six-month-detention in a youth offenders institution for breaching an injunction forbidding such a climb.

== In popular culture ==
- The Shard was featured in Alfonso Cuarón's 2006 film Children of Men, despite having not yet been built: with the film set in the year 2027, the director and cinematographer used a scale model and CGI to add the Shard to London's skyline years before it existed.
- The Shard appears in the 2012 short film The Snowman and The Snowdog and its tie-in computer game.
- The Shard has a significant role in the 2013 Doctor Who episode "The Bells of Saint John" as the headquarters of the episode's antagonist, the Great Intelligence. The Doctor vertically rode an anti-gravity motorbike on the face of the building and through a window to reach the Great Intelligence's headquarters.
- The Shard appears in the climactic scene of the 2019 film Spider-Man: Far From Home. It is Nick Fury/Talos's & Maria Hill/Soren's lookout while the final battle takes place between Spider-Man and Mysterio on Tower Bridge.
- In Pokémon Sword and Shield, the Pokémon Duraludon and its Gigantamax form are based on the Shard.
- It is featured in the Mario Kart games Mario Kart Tour and Mario Kart 8 Deluxe as part of the London Loop racecourse.
- The Shard features prominently in the 2022 music video for the Machine Gun Kelly song "Maybe".
- In the 2023 video game Starfield, the Shard can be visited, as it is the London landmark in the game.
- In the 2020 video game Microsoft Flight Simulator, the Shard is one of many landmarks you can view and visit in London.
- The Shard appears in the 2020 video game Watch Dogs: Legion, although in the game, it is called the Nexus Tower.
- The introduction sequence in the 2024 video game total conversion mod, Fallout: London features the ruined interior of the Shard right after the Wayfarer escapes from an underground lab complex run by Angel.

== See also ==
- List of tallest buildings and structures in London
- List of tallest buildings in the United Kingdom
- List of tallest buildings in the world

=== Similar structures ===
- Al Faisaliyah Center, Riyadh
- Lotte World Tower, Seoul
- Ryugyong Hotel, Pyongyang
- Transamerica Pyramid, San Francisco
- Lakhta Center, Saint Petersburg
- Burj Khalifa, Dubai
- Crown Sydney, Sydney

== Footnotes ==
Records
Preceded by One Canada Square	Tallest building in London; 2010–present 309 metres (1,014 ft)	Current holder
Preceded by One Canada Square	Tallest building in the United Kingdom; 2010–present 309 metres (1,014 ft)	Current holder
Preceded by Commerzbank Tower	Tallest building in the European Union; 2010–2020; 309 metres (1,014 ft)	Succeeded by Commerzbank Tower
Preceded by City of Capitals	Tallest building in Europe; January 2012 – November 2012; 309 metres (1,014 ft)	Succeeded by Mercury City Tower
