= The View from The Shard =

Observation deck in London, England

Coordinates: 51.5045°N 0.0865°W

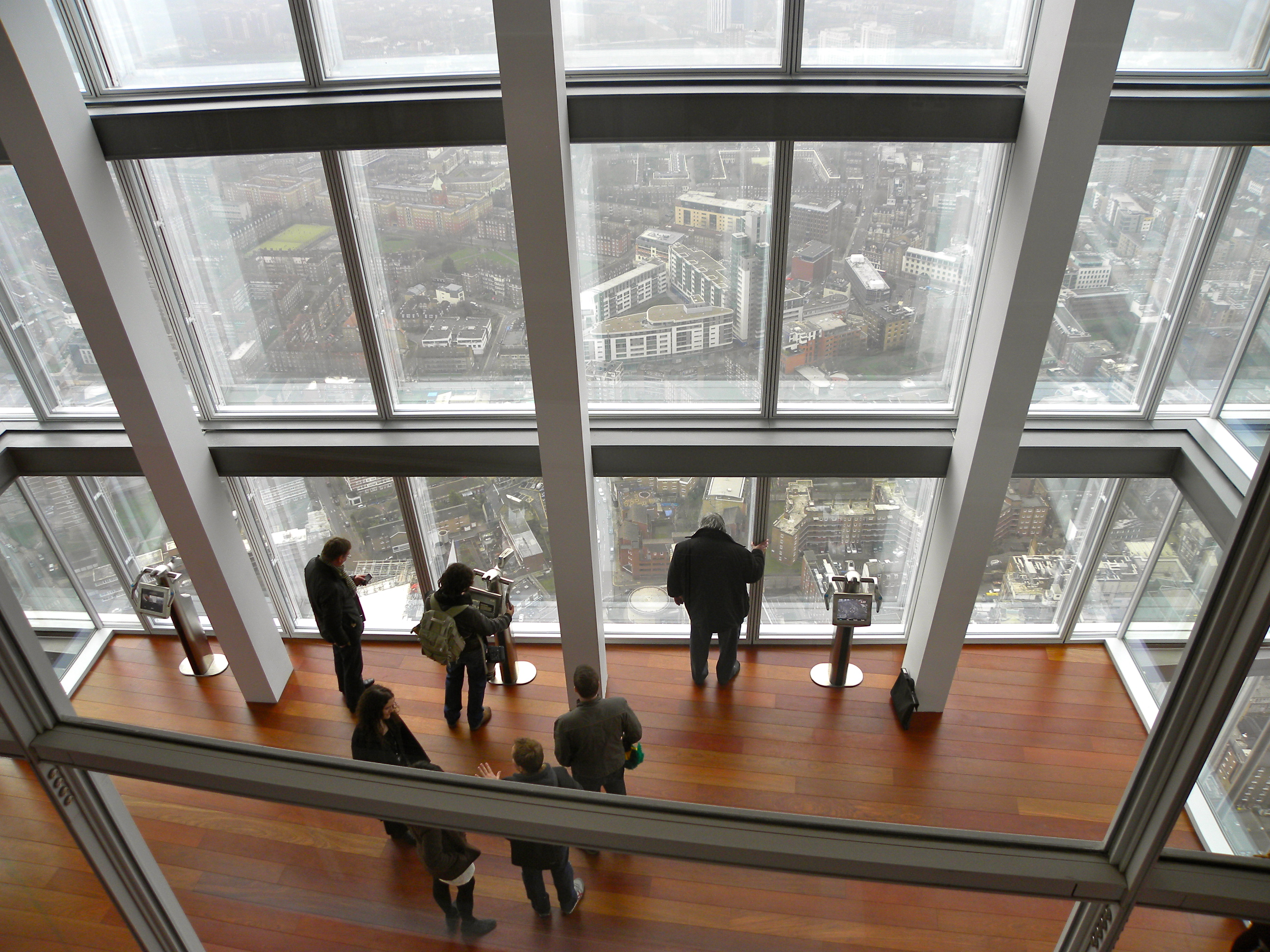
The View From the Shard viewing window

The View from The Shard is an observation deck located between the 68th and 72nd floors of The Shard, the tallest building in London. The View from The Shard consists of a triple level indoor gallery on the 69th floor and a partially outdoor gallery on the 72nd floor. It was opened on 1 February 2013 by the then Mayor of London, Boris Johnson. In its first year of opening, it was visited by 900,000 people and made a profit of over £5 million.

== Indoor Viewing Gallery ==
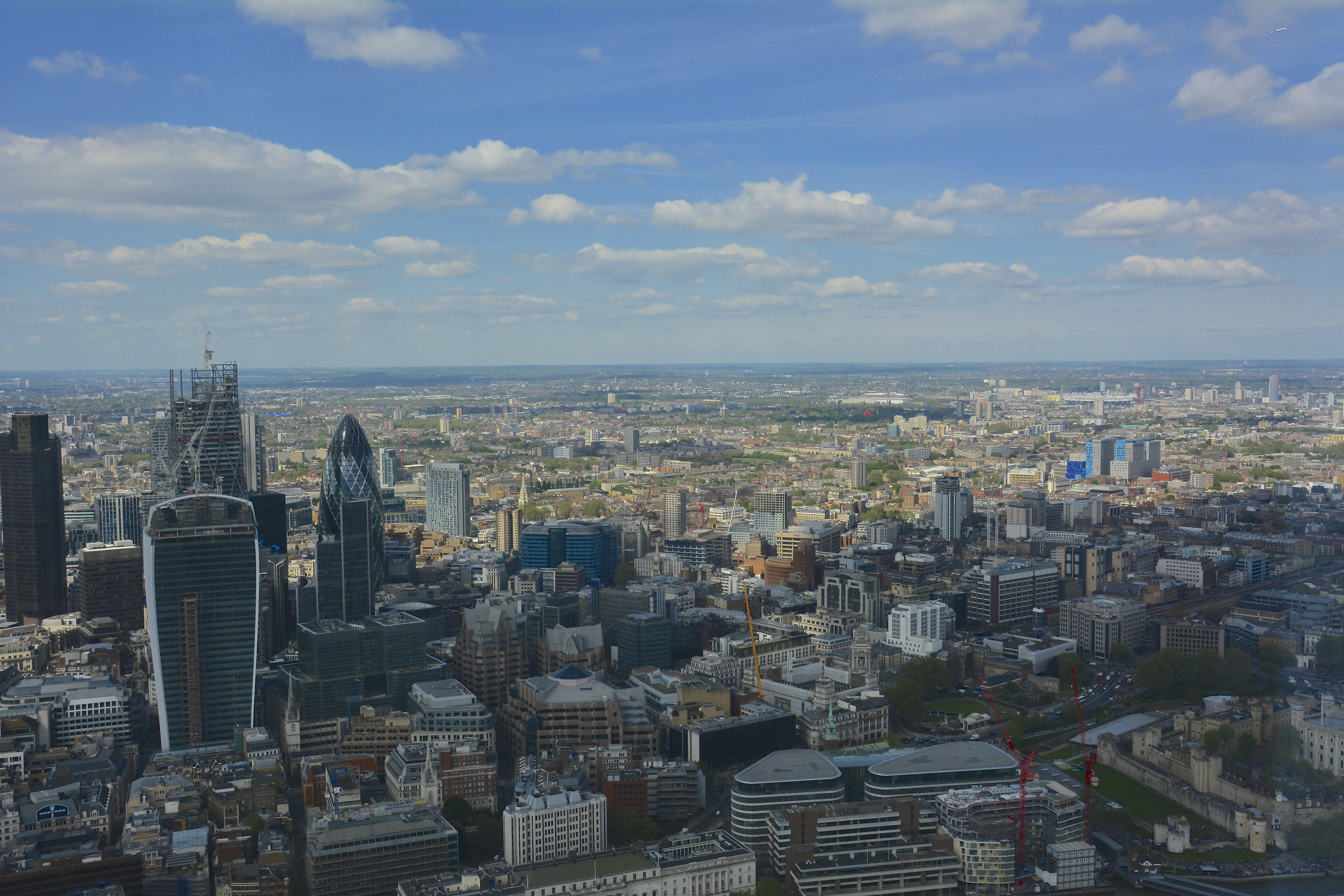
External view from the indoor viewing gallery

The triple-height main viewing gallery on the 69th floor allows for 360-degree viewing up to 40 miles (60 km). On hand are a team of “London Experts” who engage with guests and can provide knowledge, factoids, and trivia related to the view and London in general. Tours are provided throughout the day.

== Partially Outdoor Viewing Gallery ==
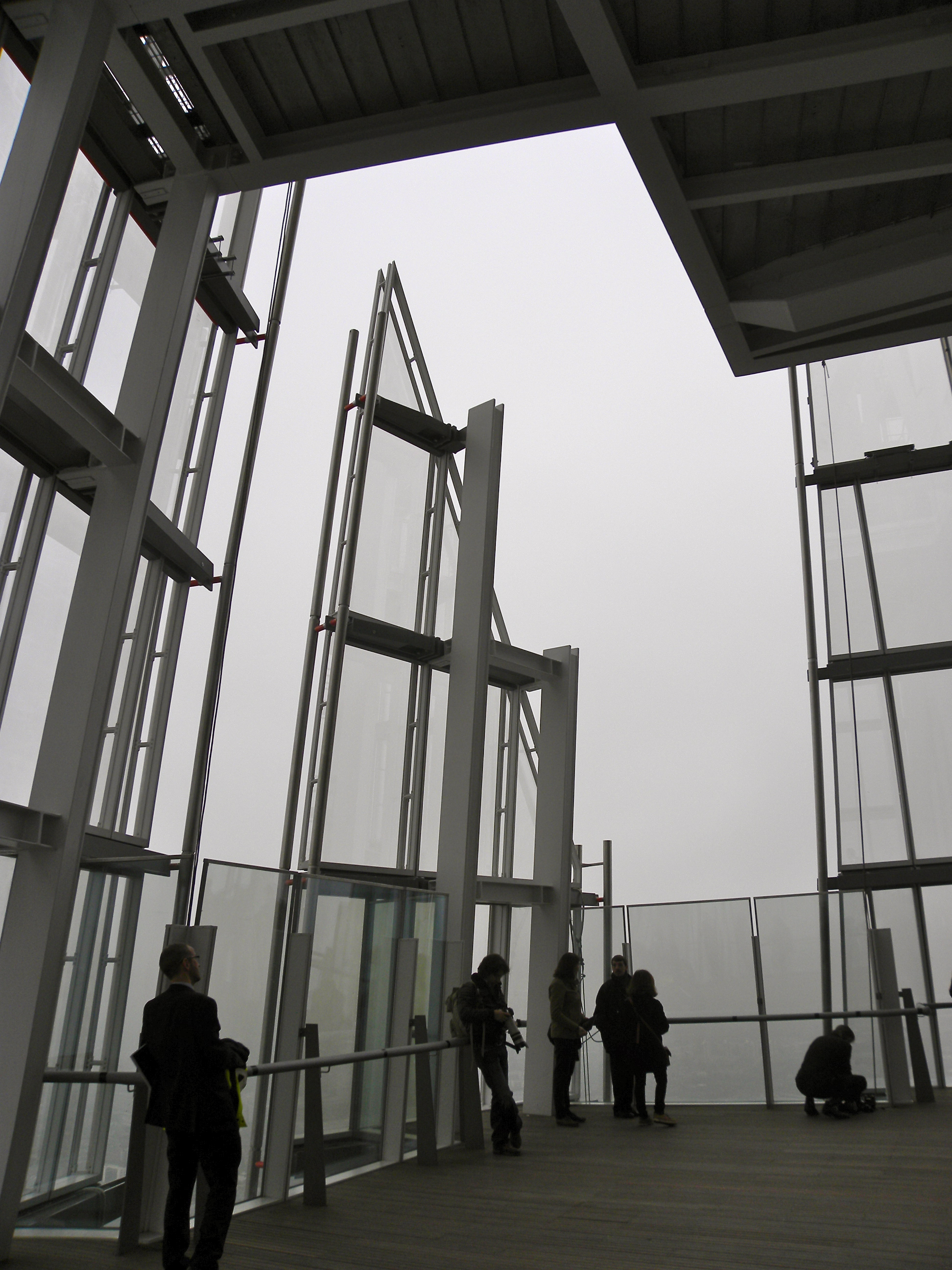
Outdoor viewing gallery

The gallery on the 72nd floor is the highest public level of the building at a height of 800 ft (244 m). This gallery is partially open-air, allowing visitors views of the pinnacle of the building, as well as 360-degree views around the building.

== Amenities ==
The lifts travel at 7 metres per second (approximately 16 mph). Including a transfer of lifts on the 33rd floor, the journey from the lobby to the 68th floor takes approximately 1 minute.

The visitor toilets feature panoramic windows with views over the River Thames and the City of London, with optional electric blinds.

As of 2023 the venue contains a champagne and cocktail bar, gelato bar and coffee shop on Level 69 and a further champagne bar on Level 72.
