= Southwark Towers =

Former high rise building in London

Coordinates: 51°30′16.3″N 0°5′11.2″W

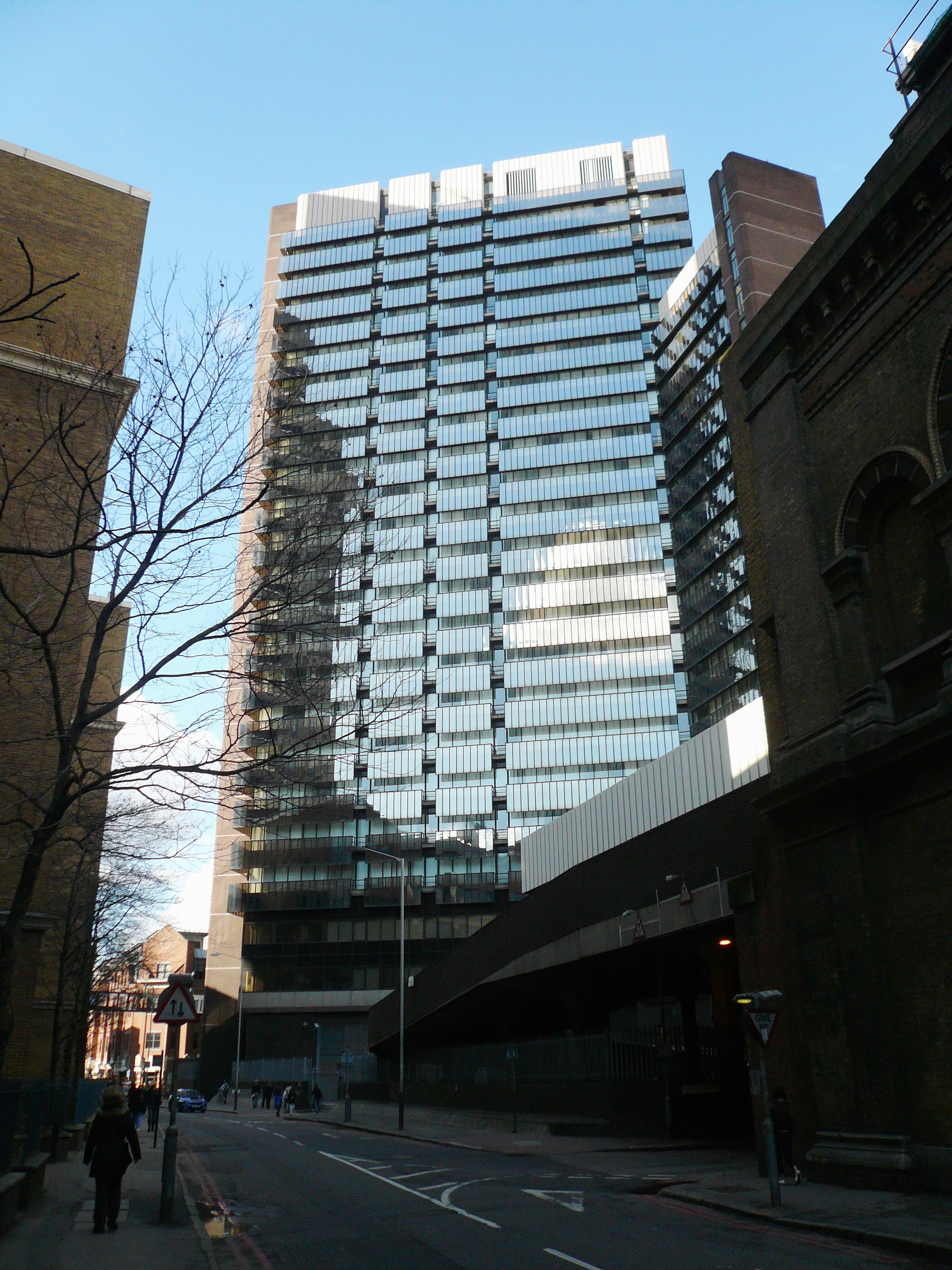
- Southwark Towers
- Interactive map of the Southwark Towers area

General information
- Status: Demolished
- Architectural style: Modernism
- Location: Southwark, London, England
- Construction started: 1970
- Completed: 1975
- Demolished: 2008

Height
- Roof: 100 m (328 ft)

Technical details
- Floor count: 25
- Floor area: 19,800 m^{2} (213,000 sq ft)

Design and construction
- Architect: Thomas Bennett
- Developer: Peachey Property Corporation
- Main contractor: Sir Robert McAlpine

Southwark Towers was a high rise building at 32 London Bridge Street, designed by TP Bennett architects, overlooking London Bridge station, in Southwark, London. When it was demolished in 2008 to make way for The Shard, it was jointly the tallest building ever to have been demolished in the United Kingdom, alongside the Drapers' Gardens tower.

== History ==
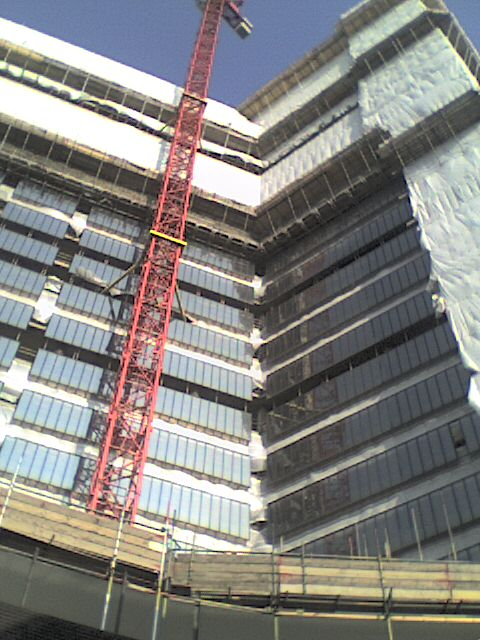
Under demolition

Completed in 1975, it was 100 metres (330 ft) tall and had 25 floors in three wings. Southwark Towers was formerly the London office of Price Waterhouse before it merged with Coopers & Lybrand in 1998. The property attracted some political interest in the 1970s when the developer, Peachey Property Corporation ('PPC'), got into financial difficulties. It was subsequently alleged that the transaction to develop the property might not have been entered into on an arm's length basis and that there might have been an element of bounty or kindness from PPC to Price Waterhouse, who happened to be PPC's auditors. Department of Trade inspectors dismissed the allegations. In 1998 the building was acquired by Irvine Sellar, a property developer.

In 2008, the building was demolished to make way for The Shard. The typical way to demolish a building in the United Kingdom is by implosion, but due to its close proximity to Guy's Hospital and other buildings, Southwark Towers was instead taken apart in pieces. It was the tallest building ever to have been demolished in the United Kingdom.

== See also ==
- List of tallest buildings and structures in London
