= Mates by Irvine Sellars =

- Industry: fashion retailer
- Founder: Irvine Sellar
- Number of locations: 90 shops
- Products: men's and women's clothing
- Number of employees: 3,000 employees

Mates by Irvine Sellars was a British fashion retail chain founded by Irvine Sellar.

Mates started with one shop is Soho's Carnaby Street and grew to become "Britain’s second-biggest fashion chain" with 90 shops in 1981, when it was sold to a South African investor.

Sellar claimed that Mates was the first retail chain to sell men's and women's clothing under the same roof, and that they had 3,000 employees.
