= Irvine Sellar =

British property developer (1934–2017)

- Born: Irvine Gerald Sellar; 3 September 1934; London, England
- Died: 26 February 2017 (aged 82); England
- Occupation: Property developer
- Spouse: Elizabeth Sellar
- Children: 3

Irvine Gerald Sellar (3 September 1934 – 26 February 2017) was an English fashion retailer, and later property developer. He was the founder of the Sellar Property Group, and the developer of The Shard.

== Early life ==
Sellar was born on 3 September 1934 in London, England.

He worked with his father on markets in and around the East End of London. His family was Jewish, and he grew up in Southgate, London. Sellar left school at 16 and studied accounting but decided to start working instead.

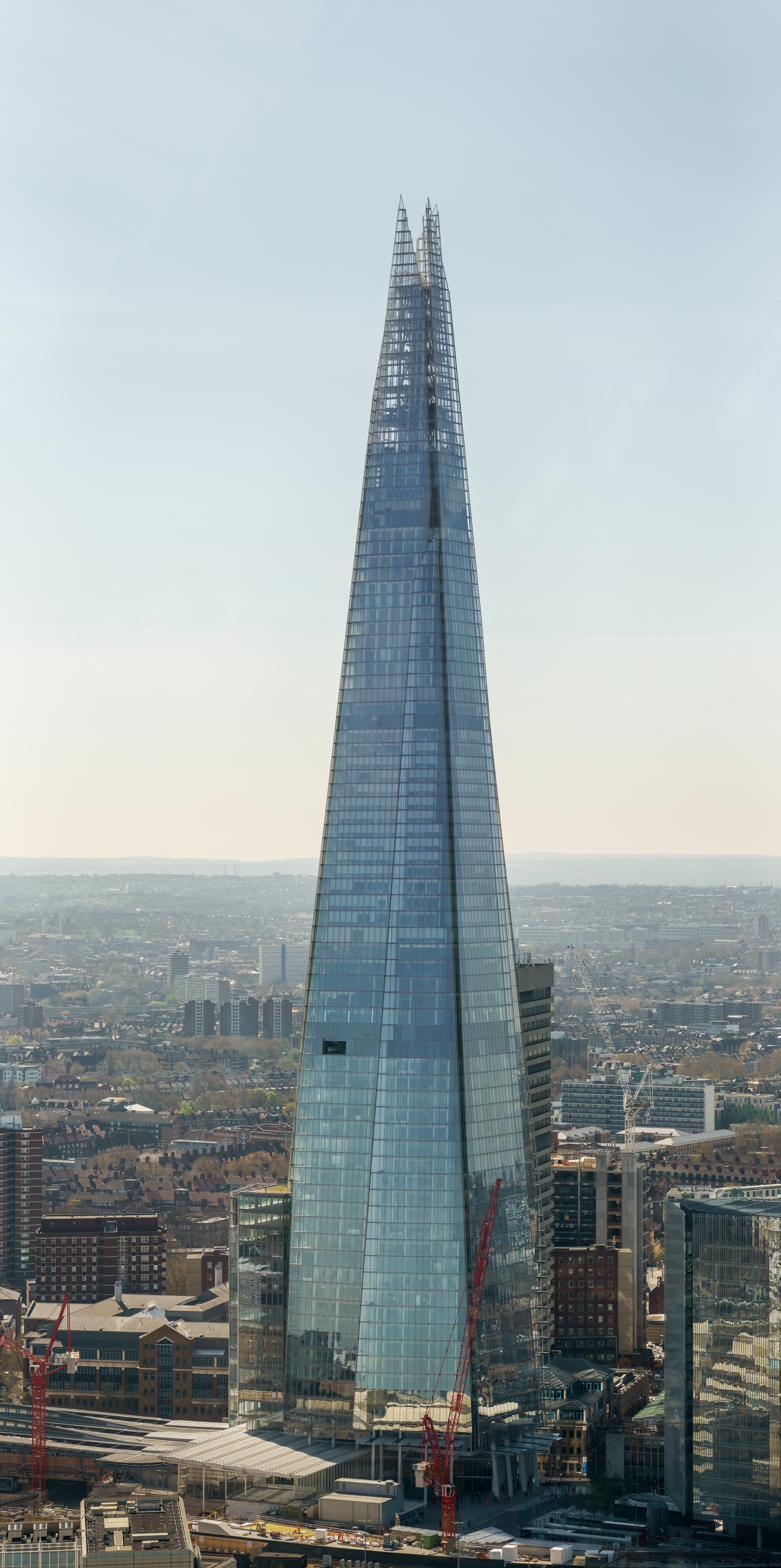
The Shard, developed by Sellar.

== Career ==
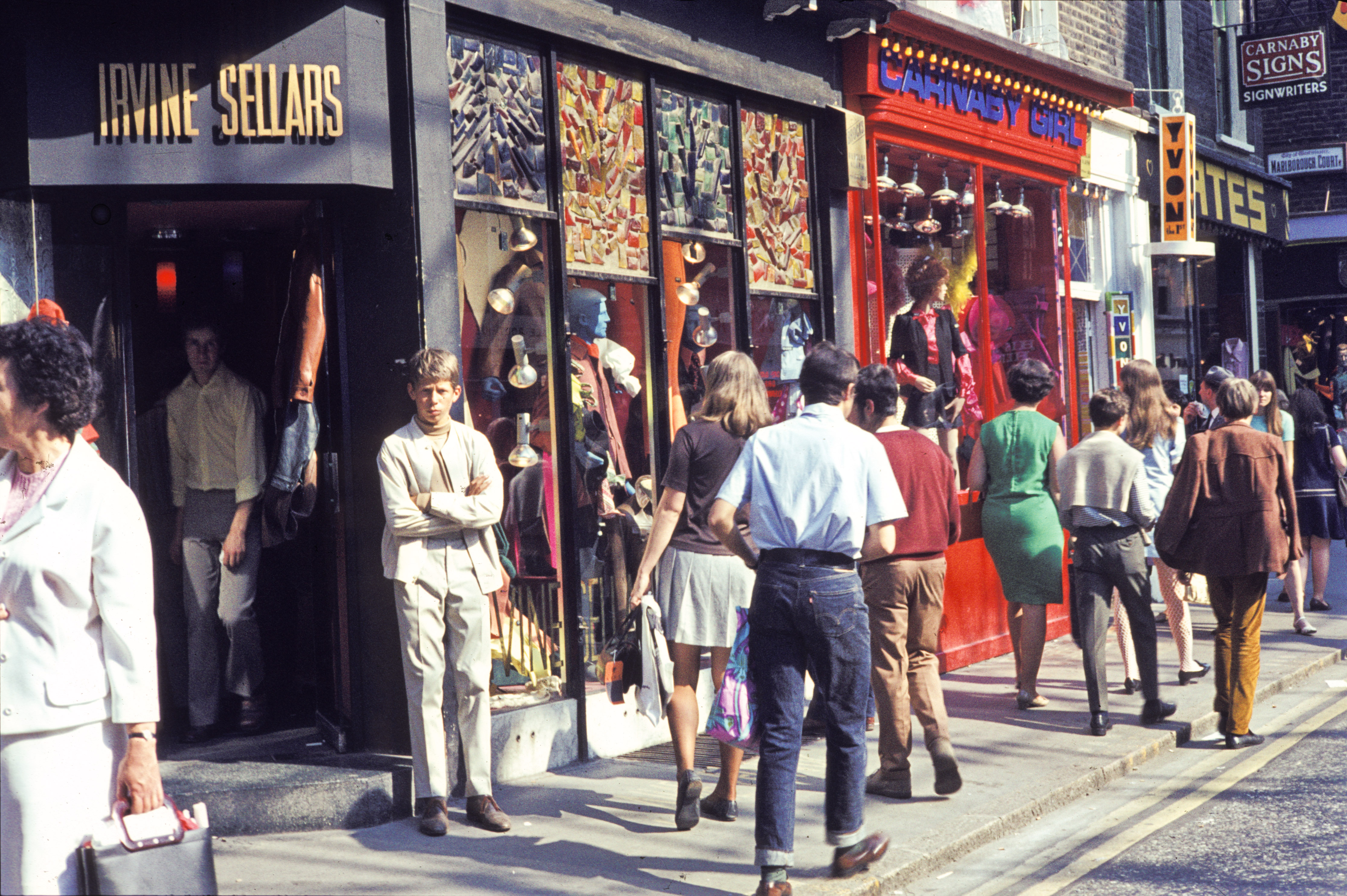
Sellar's shop on Carnaby Street, 1968

Sellar started his career as a market trader before opening his first shop in St Albans. A second shop followed in Soho's Wardour Street in 1964. The following year, along with his wife Elizabeth, a third shop was opened on Carnaby Street, a parade that was to become a worldwide Mecca for fashion, helping to define London's swinging 60s.

Meanwhile, he founded the first unisex fashion company in the United Kingdom, Mates by Irvine Sellars. The company later became "Britain’s second-biggest fashion chain," with 90 shops in 1981. That year, he sold it to a South African investor.

Sellar founded Ford Sellar Morris, a property company listed on the London Stock Exchange. Sellar borrowed £111m in 1989 and, because of a property downturn in 1991, the company went bankrupt in 1991-92, when Sellar lost £30 million.

Sellar founded the Sellar Property Group. He acquired the headquarters of PwC in London Bridge in 1998. That year, he acquired the site of what would later become The Shard. With 80% from Qatari investors, Sellar completed the construction of The Shard in 2012. He subsequently developed buildings near Paddington Station.

In December 2016, his plan to develop the 19-storey Paddington Cube for £775 million was approved by Westminster City Council.

== Personal life ==
With his wife Elizabeth, Sellar had two sons, James, who went on to serve as chairman of SPG, and Paul, a playwright, as well as a daughter, Caroline.

In 2015, Irvine and James Sellar had an estimated joint wealth of GBP£220 million. Sellar was a black belt in judo, drove a Rolls-Royce and smoked cigars.

== Death ==
Irvine Sellar died on 26 February 2017, aged 82.
