= Sellar Property Group =

British property group

- Company type: Private
- Industry: Real estate
- Founder: Irvine Sellar
- Headquarters: London, United Kingdom
- Key people: James Sellar (CEO)
- Website: sellar.com

Sellar Property Group is a British property group. It is headquartered at 42-44 Bermondsey Street, London. Sellar was previously headquartered in Park Street, Mayfair.

== Developments ==
The company is notable for its project Shard London Bridge, built in London Borough of Southwark, United Kingdom.

The company has teamed up with Renzo Piano and Great Western Developments on plans for Paddington Quarter, which is a £775m redevelopment of the former Royal Mail sorting office adjacent to Paddington Station.

The company is developing King’s Place following planning permission being granted for a 444-bed student accommodation development on Borough High Street.
