= Siteimprove =

Software company

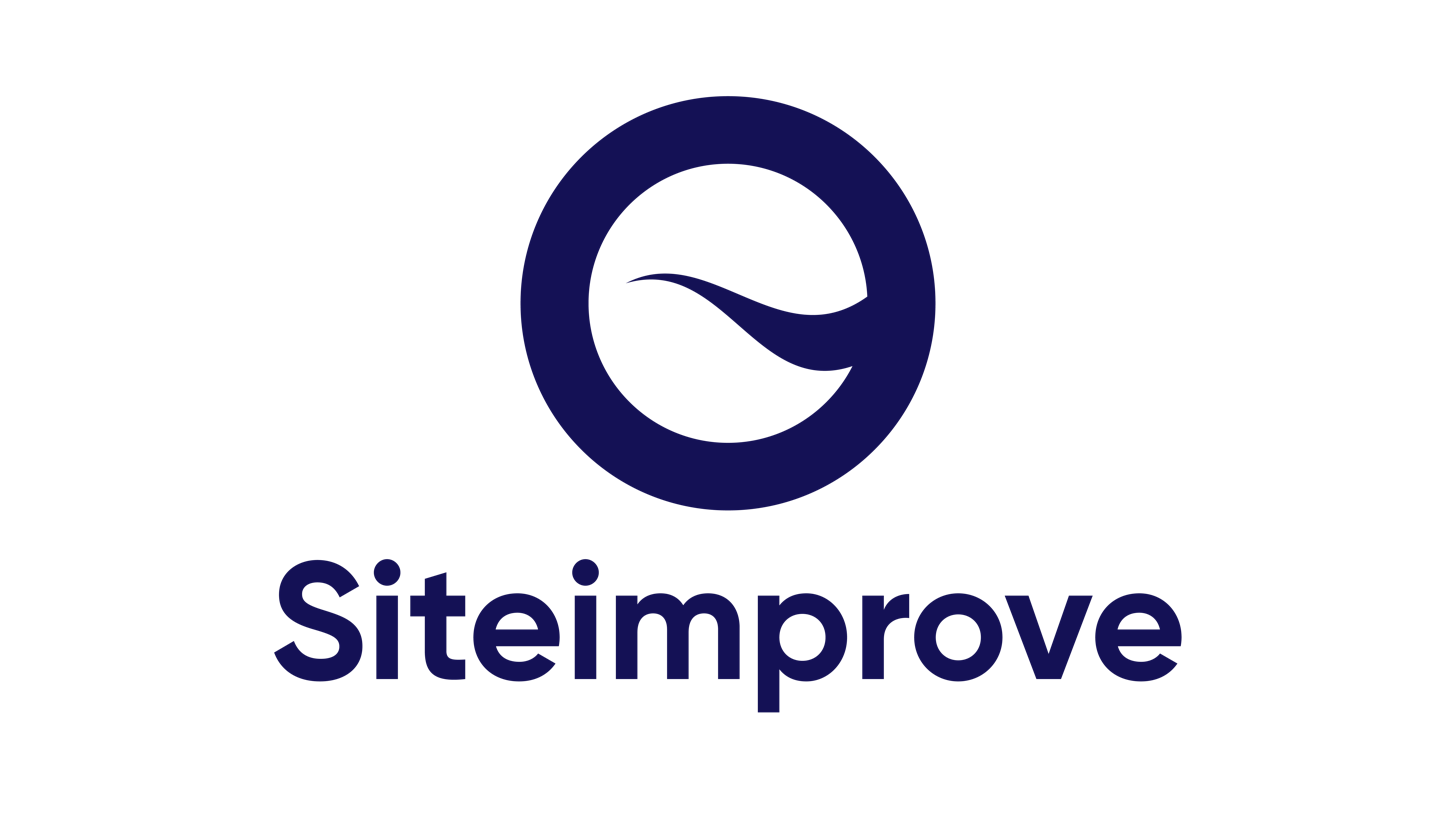
- Type: Private
- Industry: Marketing
- Founded: 2003; 23 years ago
- Founder: Morten Ebbesen
- Headquarters: Copenhagen, Denmark
- Key people: Nayaki Nayyar (CEO)
- Products: Marketing-related software as a service
- Services: Accessibility, GDPR, SEO
- Number of employees: 600+
- Website: siteimprove.com

Siteimprove is a multinational Software-as-a-Service (SaaS) company that creates cloud-based tools and services for website governance and optimization. Siteimprove was founded in 2003, is headquartered in Copenhagen, Denmark, and actively operates in numerous countries including Austria, Australia, Canada, Denmark, England, Finland, France, Germany, Italy, Japan, The Netherlands, Norway, Sweden, Switzerland, and US.

== History ==
Morten Ebbesen founded Siteimprove in Denmark in 2003. Over the course of the next six years, the company expanded its market presence to Great Britain, US, and Sweden. In 2010, Siteimprove joined the United Nations Global Compact corporate social responsibility (CSR) program and published its first annual CSR report. During 2012, 2013 and 2014, Siteimprove expanded its operations to Germany, The Netherlands, Norway, and Ireland. In 2015, the company expanded its market presence to Australia, Austria, Canada, Switzerland, Finland, and France. In December 2015, Siteimprove received a USD 55 million minority investment from global growth equity firm Summit Partners. In 2017, Siteimprove expanded into Japan and acquired the Danish consultancy firm, Marketing Lion. In 2020, Nordic Capital took a majority ownership position within Siteimprove to further invest and accelerate growth. In 2021, Shane Paladin was appointed CEO to further expand global customer operations and product development. In 2025, Siteimprove was listed in the Leader category, third position, by Forrester Research in The Forrester Wave: Digital Accessibility Platforms, Q4 2025 report. In 2026, Siteimprove was listed in the Leader category, third position, by Gartner in The Magic Quadrant for Digital Accessibility.

== Products ==
Siteimprove’s cloud-based software products automate the process of identifying errors and problems on websites. The company’s web governance platform constitutes a collection of integrated tools for controlling website content, creating internal web policies, improving web accessibility in accordance with the global Web Content Accessibility Guidelines 2.0 for compliancy levels A, AA, and AAA, improving search engine optimization (SEO), monitoring website performance, identifying personal data and website cookies, and utilizing website analytics data.
